= Lisan ud-Dawat =

Indo-European language of Gujarat, India

Lisaan o Da'wat il-Bohra
- Lisan al-Dawat
- لسان دعوۃ البهرة
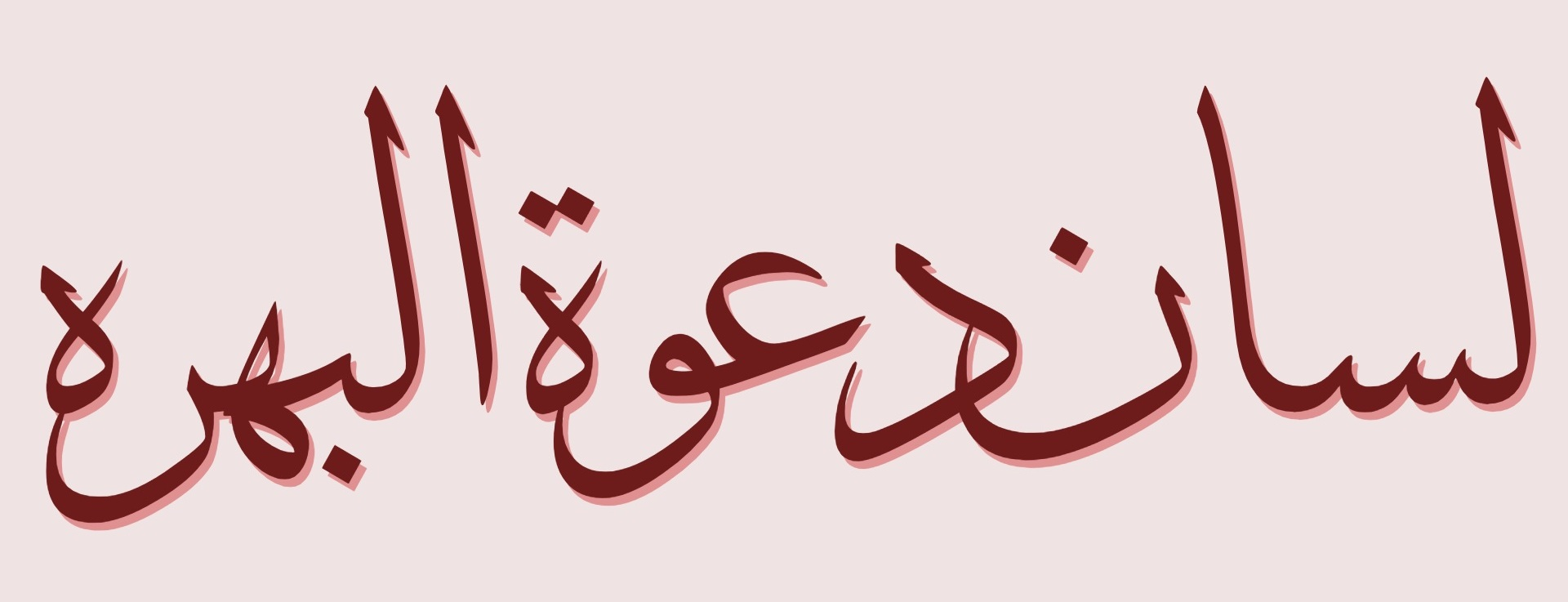
- "Lisaan o Da'wat il Bohra" in the Arabic script
- Region: Western India, Gujarat
- Language family: Indo-European: Indo-Iranian; Indo-Aryan; Western; Gujarati; Lisaan o Da'wat il-Bohra
- Writing system: Arabic script

Language codes
- ISO 639-3: –

Lisaan ud-Da'wat or Lisaan o Da'wat il Bohra or Lisan ud-Dawat (Arabic: لسان الدعوة, lit. 'language of the Da'wat', da'wat ni zabaan; abbreviated LDB) is the language of the Dawoodi Bohras and Alavi Bohras, Isma'ili Shi'a offshoots of the Muslim community primarily from Gujarat, who follow the Taiyebi doctrines and theology. The language is based on a Neo-Indo-Aryan language, Gujarati, but incorporates a heavy amount of Arabic, Urdu, and Persian vocabulary and is written in the Arabic script naskh style. Originally a ritual language, since the period of the missionaries (دعاۃ) in Ahmedabad around 1005 AH/1597 AD it has also been propagated as the vernacular language for members of the Bohra communities, but the version used by their religious leader-Saiyedna and his assembly members or clergy still differs slightly from the Gujarati spoken by their community members. The reason is that the religious sermons is highly loaded and peppered with the inputs and sentences of Arabic language having direct references with ancient sectarian Bohra literature linked with Egyptian and Yemeni phase of Da'wah. The earliest Bohras were Indian, and they spoke Gujarati. With the continuous effort of the Taiyebi leadership (of Yemen and their representatives in India) to promote Qur'anic and Islamic learning within the community, the language of these texts has, over time, percolated Lisaan ul-Da'wat, with Arabic (and Persian) words replacing part of the Gujarati lexicon.

Some key works in Lisan al-Dawat are the translations of the Arabic literary masterpieces of Isma'ili literature written during the reign of the Fatimids in Persia and Egypt (225-525 AH/840-1131 AD) and also the Taiyebi literature written in Yemen by 24 different missionaries (pl. du'aat) between 532 and 974 AH/1137-1566 AD, with summaries and admonitions in poetic form too. The Da'i-missionary (working under the guidance of Imam) was also expected to be sufficiently familiar with the teachings of different religions as well as various Islamic traditions, whilst knowing the local language and customs of the province in which he was to operate. This is the reason that the Bohra leadership of Ahmedabad phase (946-1070 AH/1540-1660) made notable efforts to amalgamate Yemeni Arabic lexicon with the local language. The influx of the Persian words during this time is due to the Mughals ruling the major parts of Gujarat. During the course of time this unique language became an identity for Bohras. Arabic tradition of religious writings continued in India and some works composed recently in Lisan al-Dawat is highly Arabicized as they are either translations or adaptations of earlier works and intended for popular use.

Many in the community look upon their language Lisan al-Dawat as a bridge to keep united irrespective of their region, occupation and education. Also it serves as a unique tool to distinguish themselves from other Gujarati communities who rather speak the same Gujarati but devoid of Arabic accent and vocabulary. In more recent times (i.e. since the beginning of 14th century AH), some of these works have appeared in a form of Arabicized Gujarati written in Arabic script, the official language of the Bohra Da'wah, so as to reach a wider public. In South Asia, the official language of the Sulaymani Bohras is Urdu, the language commonly used by the majority of the Muslims of India and Pakistan. They also deliver their sermons in Urdu.

== Alphabet ==
=== Vowel diacritics ===
Though not normally written and only implied, like Urdu, Lisan ud-Dawat also has diacritics taken from the Arabic language to express short vowels.

Diacritics used in Lisan ud-Dawat
Symbol	Name	Usage	IPA	Notes
ٰ	Khari Zabar	a	[ə]	Used in Arabic loanwords such as ‘عیسیٰ’ (‘Jesus’)
َ	Zabar	a	[ə]	
ً	Zabar Tanwīn	-an	[ən]	Used for Arabic loanwords such as ‘فوراً’ (‘Immediately’)
ٓ	Maddah	ā	[ɑː]	Used only for Alif Maddah (ا + ٓ = آ), not written as a separate diacritic
ِ	Zer	i	[ɪ]	Written underneath a letter
ٍ	Zer Tanwīn	in	[ɪn]	Rarely used for Arabic loanwords, written underneath a letter
ُ	Pesh	u	[u]	
ٔ	Hamza	varied	-	Used on vowels to indicate a diphthong between two vowels, examples such as: ‘ئ’, ‘ۓ’, ‘ؤ‘, and أ , not written as a separate diacritic
ّ	Tashdīd	Geminite	[.]	Doubles a consonant, goes above the letter being doubled - کّ = kk

=== Consonants ===
No.	Name		IPA	Final glyph	Medial glyph	Initial glyph	Isolated glyph	Gujarati
1	الف	alif	/ɑ̈, ʔ, ∅/	ـا	ـا	ا	ا	અ, આ (medial)
2	بے	bē	/b/	ـب	ـبـ	بـ	ب	બ
3	پے	pē	/p/	ـپ	ـپـ	پـ	پ	પ
4	تے	tē	/t/	ـت	ـتـ	تـ	ت	ત
5	ٹے	ṭē	/ʈ/	ـٹ	ـٹـ	ٹـ	ٹ	ટ
6	ثے	s̱ē	/s , θ/	ـث	ـثـ	ثـ	ث	સ થ઼
7	جيم	jīm	/d͡ʒ/	ـج	ـجـ	جـ	ج	જ
8	چے	cē	/t͡ʃ/	ـچ	ـچـ	چـ	چ	ચ
9	بڑی حے	baṛī ḥē	/ɦ/	ـح	ـحـ	حـ	ح	હ
10	خے	k͟hē	/x/	ـخ	ـخـ	خـ	خ	ખ઼
11	دال	dāl	/d/	ـد	ـد	د	د	દ
12	ڈال	ḍāl	/ɖ/	ـڈ	ـڈ	ڈ	ڈ	ડ
13	ذال	ẕāl	/z , ð/	ـذ	ـذ	ذ	ذ	ઝ઼ ધ઼
14	رے	rē	/r/	ـر	ـر	ر	ر	ર
15	ڑے	ṛē	/ɽ/	ـڑ	ـڑ	ڑ	ڑ	દ઼
16	زے	zē	/z/	ـز	ـز	ز	ز	ઝ઼
17	ژے	zhē	/ʒ/	ـژ	ـژ	ژ	ژ	_
18	سین	sīn	/s/	ـس	ـسـ	سـ	س	સ
19	شین	shīn	/ʃ/	ـش	ـشـ	شـ	ش	શ
20	صاد	ṣvād	/s/	ـص	ـصـ	صـ	ص	સ
21	ضاد	ẓvād	/z/	ـض	ـضـ	ضـ	ض	ઝ઼
22	طوۓ	t̤oʼē	/t/	ـط	ـطـ	طـ	ط	ત
23	ظوۓ	z̤oʼē	/z/	ـظ	ـظـ	ظـ	ظ	ઝ઼
24	عین	ʻain	/ə,ɑː,ɪ,iː,u,uː,oː,ɔː,eː,ɛː, ʔ, ∅/	ـع	ـعـ	عـ	ع	અ,આ,ઇ,ઈ,ઉ,ઊ,ઍ,ઐ,ઓ,ઔ
25	غین	g͟hain	/ɣ/	ـغ	ـغـ	غـ	غ	ગ઼
26	فے	fē	/f/	ـف	ـفـ	فـ	ف	ફ઼
27	قاف	qāf	/q/	ـق	ـقـ	قـ	ق	ક઼
28	کاف	kāf	/k/	ـک	ـکـ	کـ	ک	ક
29	گاف	gāf	/ɡ/	ـگ	ـگـ	گـ	گ	ગ
30	لام	lām	/l/	ـل	ـلـ	لـ	ل	લ
31	لؕام	ḷām	/ɭ/	ـلؕ	ـلؕـ	لؕـ	لؕ	ળ
32	میم	mīm	/m/	ـم	ـمـ	مـ	م	મ
33	نون	nūn	/n, ɲ/	ـن	ـنـ	نـ	ن	ન
34	ݨون	ṇūṇ	/ɳ/	ـݨ	ـݨـ	ݨـ	ݨ	ણ
35	نون غنّہ	nūn ġunnah	/◌̃, ŋ/	ـں	ـن٘ـ	ن٘ـ	ں (ن٘)	ં
36	واؤ	vāʼo	/ʋ, u, ʊ, o, ɔ, əʋ/	ـو	ـو	و	و	ઊ, ઓ
37	نکی ہے گول ہے	choṭī hē gol hē	/ɦ, ɑ, e/	ـہ	ـہـ	ہـ	ہ	હ
38	دو چشمی ہے	do-cashmī hē	/ʰ/ or /ʱ/	ـھ	ـھـ	ھ	ھ	varied / -
39	ہمزہ	hamzah	/ʔ/, /∅/	ء	ء	ء	ء	-
40	چھوٹی يے	choṭī yē	/j, i/	ـی	ـیـ	یـ	ی	ઈ, ઍ
41	بڑی يے	baṛī yē	/ɛ, e,əj/	ـے	ـے	ے	ے	ઍ, ઐ

No Lisan ud Dawat words begin with ں, ڑ or ے. The digraphs of aspirated consonants are as follows. In addition, ل , لؕ form ligatures with ا: لا (ـلا) and لؕا (ـلؕا) and unlike Urdu Lisan ud-Dawat word which have t at last is always written with ۃ , not ت. For example the Urdu word - دعوت. The Lisan ud-Dawat word - دعوۃ.

=== Aspirated Consonants ===
No.	Digraph	Transcription	IPA	Example
1	بھ	bh	[bʱ]	بھارت
2	پھ	ph	[pʰ]	پھلؕ
3	تھ	th	[tʰ]	ہاتھی
4	ٹھ	ṭh	[ʈʰ]	ٹھلؕیو
5	جھ	jh	[d͡ʒʱ]	جھاڑی
6	چھ	ch	[t͡ʃʰ]	چھوکرا
7	دھ	dh	[dʱ]	دھوبی
8	ڈھ	ḍh	[ɖʱ]	ڈھول
9	رھ	rh	[rʱ]	رهبر
10	ڑھ	ṛh	[ɽʱ]	کڑھنا
11	کھ	kh	[kʰ]	کھولنا
12	گھ	gh	[ɡʱ]	گھبراہٹ
13	لھ	lh	[lʱ]	لھد
14	مھ	mh	[mʱ]	ڈمھ
15	نھ	nh	[nʱ]	ننھا
16	وھ	wh	[ʋʱ]	وهلا
17	یھ	yh	[jʱ]	یھڈ

=== Vowels ===
Romanization	Final	Middle	Initial
a (અ)	N/A	ـَ	اَ
ā (આ)	ـَا، ـَی، ـَہ	ـَا	آ
i (ઇ)	N/A	ـِ	اِ
ī (ઈ)	ـِى	ـِيـ	اِی
ē (ઍ)	ـے	ـيـ	اے
ai (ઐ)	ـَے	ـَيـ	اَے
u (ઉ)	N/A	ـُ	اُ
ū (ઊ)	ـُو		اُو
o (ઓ)	ـو		او
au (ઔ)	ـَو		اَو

- ے (vadī ye) is only found in the final position, when writing the sounds e (ઍ) or æ (ઐ), and in initial and medial positions, it takes the form of یَ.

== Alavi Bohras (Lisaan ud-Da'wat il-'Alaviyah (LDA)-لسان الدعوۃ العلویۃ) ==
=== Origin ===
The Alavi Bohra community are Muslims who believe in Shi'a Isma'ili Taiyebi doctrines, beliefs and tenets. The 18th Faatemi Imaam Maulaana al-Mustansir Billah (478 AH/1094 AD), from the Aal-progeny of Muhammad al-Mustafaa, held the seat of the Fatimid Empire in Egypt and acted as the sole authority of the Shi'a Isma'ili branch of Islam. In his era, Maulaai Ahmad (مولائي احمد) along with his accomplices Maulaai Abdullah and Maulaai Nuruddin, on Mustansir Billah's decree, arrived at the coast of Gujarat (Khambhat) along with a group of traders. His responsibility was to spread Shi'i Islam in the guise of doing trade. At that time, Sidhraj Jaysingh was ruling in Patan-Sidhpur, and a small Isma'ili community was already residing in Gujarat who were well-versed with local customs and language. They helped the clergy in every possible way to dispense the word of Imam among those Brahmins who showed sincere interest in Isma'ili doctrine. Historical accounts points that early Taiyebi preachers-maulaai had to travel far and wide on the commands of their Da'i to such a remote place where they found the native language as a big hindrance to their religious agenda. So, they first learned and mastered the local language and it proved as a best tool of communication.

At the end of the fifth century AH, many such representatives of Faatemi Imaam were also present in Yemen. Every Isma'ili preacher who came to India after Maulaai Ahmad, either from Egypt or from Yemen, had Arabic as his mother tongue and it happened to be the official language of the Fatimids. With the help of Gujarati speaking Isma'ili traders they gradually learnt the local native language to propagate their religion. It also happened that, in order to learn more about their religious teachings, many people from Gujarat migrated to Yemen to get religious teachings directly from the Da'i (the representative of the Imam of Egypt). This took place in the 10th century AH/16th century AD. This is where the basic Yemeni Arabic language of Taiyebis first got combined with the local Gujarati language, giving birth to a new form of language which got more correlative, complex and comprehensive over time. Scholarly exchanges took place, mainly consisting of Indians visiting Yemen for instruction and guidance. The predominant language for the literary output of this period remained Arabic, although at a later stage the use of Gujarati in Arabic script became common. This form of language got the name Lisaan ud-Da'wat (Lisan al-Dawah) or Lughat ud-Da'wat (لغۃ الدعوۃ).

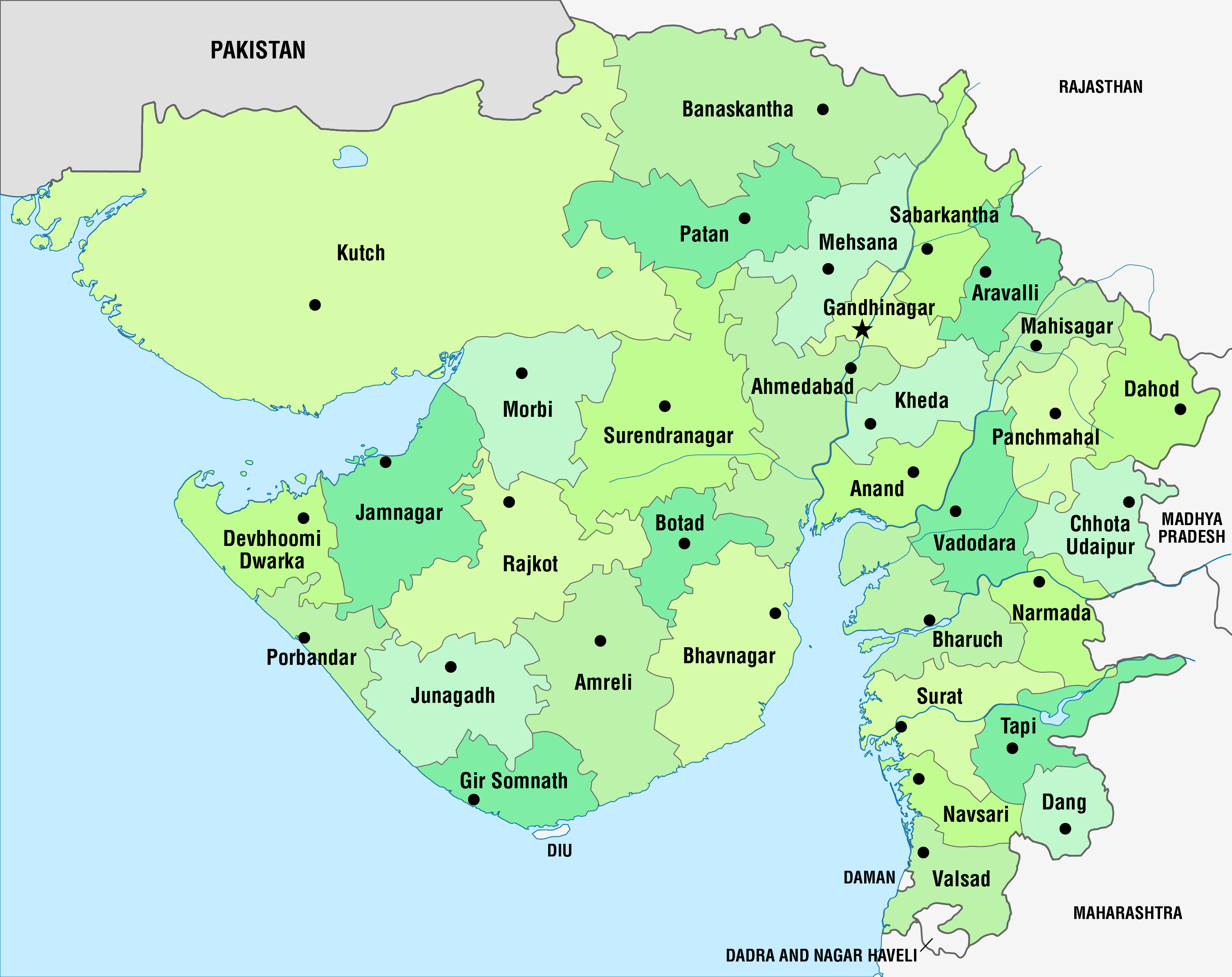
Map of Gujarat

==== Language contact of Arabic, Sanskrit, and Gujarati with Persian and Urdu ====
A genealogical classification of languages is a classification according to their development from common ancestors. A language family is a group of languages related through descent from a common ancestor, called the proto language of that family. Let's see the tree diagrams of the two major language families which will help us to establish the relation among the languages. The first is Proto Indo-European Language and the other is Proto Hemito-Semitic/Afro-Asiatic language families.

During the mid-16th century, Mughals invaded India through the Gulf of Khambhat (Cambay), since Khambhat was then the biggest port of India. Mughals came from Persia (Iran) and spoke Persian (Farsi). This was the period when Bohra missionaries practiced and preached their faith openly and the local people felt their presence in Ahmedabad. Thus, with their acumen of doing trade and business, their social and commercial activities in and around Ahmedabad got momentum. Their language too progressed and it became the blend of Arabic, Urdu, Gujarati and Persian now known as a Bohra Gujarati Zabaan. Also, Persian art and culture with some Gujarati Hindu traditions got amalgamated with Indian Bohra art and culture.

With the invasion of the Mughals arose a need for trade and commerce. New trade routes were opened between India and Persia. Along this route, Turkic people also started trade and commerce. They spoke a Persio-Arabic language. The amalgamation of their language with the contemporary language of India gave rise to a new language, a link language called Urdu, due to the mingling of Persian and Hindavi (aam boli). Thus it is a Pidgin language and a part of the Proto Indo-European language family. During this era, in 1030 AH/1621 AD, there was a major schism of succession of religious authority (da'i) in Ahmedabad among the Bohras. A separation occurred and a small group of Bohras believed in the Da'iship (leadership) of the 29th Da'i al-Mutlaq Saiyedna Ali Saheb, the grandson of the 28th Da'i Saiyedna Shaikh Aadam saheb. They were called as "Alavi" from now onward after their first da'i "Ali" after the schism. Thus, Alavi Bohras maintained their own separate identity from other Bohra groups of Gujarat and Yemen, but the basic language pattern of all the Bohra communities remained unchanged, unlike the Sulaymani Bohras who chose to embrace Urdu as their community language.

Thus due to these reasons and the migration of the Alavi Bohras from Ahmedabad to Vadodara in 1110 AH/1699 AD, they speak Lisaan ud-Da'wat, a blend of many languages including Khojki. However, Khojki has a minimal influence on the Alavi Bohra language and Sanskrit vocabulary also gradually degraded due to Gujarati influence on this language. Alavi Bohras read, write and speak an Arabicized form (permeated with Arabic and Persian vocabulary) of Gujarati called Lisaan ud-Da'wat il-'Alaviyah-لسان الدعوۃ العلویۃ-LDA, i.e. the "Language of the Truly Guided Mission of Ali" (29th Da'i called Saiyedna and martyr). Today, Alavi Bohras are settled in Vadodara (Gujarat) which is the official headquarters of the 45th Da'i al-Mutlaq Saiyedna Haatim Zakiyuddin saheb, called "ad-Da'wat ul-Haadiyat ul-'Alaviyah-الدعوۃ الهادیۃ العلویۃ" – the Rightly Guided Alavi Mission.

LDA	محبو عبادۃ کرو صبح و شام			
Couplet	Mohibbo	'Ibādat	Karo	Subah-o-shām
Language	Arabic	Arabic	Gujarati	Persian
English	Loving people	Worship	Do	Morning-and-evening
Translation	O people of love! Worship (your Lord) in morning and evening			

LDA	عبادۃ سی ملسے فضیلۃ تمام				
Couplet	'Ibādat	Si	Milse	Fazilat	Tamām
Language	Arabic	Gujarati	Gujarati	Arabic	Persian
English	Worship	By	Will get	Merits	All
Translation	All merits you will get by worship				

LDA	تمیں دنیا نی دولت چھو				
Couplet	Tame	Duniyā	Ni	Daulat	Cho
Language	Gujarati	Arabic	Gujarati	Arabic	Gujarati
English	You	World	's	Wealth	Are
Translation	You are the wealth of the World				

LDA		تمیں عقبی نی عزت چھو			
Couplet	Tame	'Uqbā	Ni	'Izzat	Cho
Language	Gujarati	Arabic	Gujarati	Arabic	Gujarati
English	You	Hereafter	's	Respect	Are
Translation	You are the respect of the Hereafter				

=== Sound change and semantic change ===
==== Sound change ====
Sound change is the most studied area in historical linguistics. Sound tends to change over time and due to contacts with other languages. Sound change also helps to determine whether languages are related.

Example	Standard Gujarati	LDA	Meaning
i.	pankho - પંખો	fankho پھنکھو	fan
ii.	aapo - આપો	aalo آلو	give

In example i, the sound /p/ in 'pankho', meaning "fan", changes to the sound /f/ in 'fankho', meaning "fan". This change has come due to the interaction of Arabic, as it does not have the sound /p/. A similar case is given in example ii. Other examples:

Example	Standard Gujarati	LDA	Meaning
iii.	vAL - વાળ	bAl - بال	hair
iv.	maL - મળ	mil - مل	meet
v.	vAdaL - વાદળ	vAdal - وادل	cloud
vi.	kangAL - કંગાળ	kangAl - کاگل	poor
vii.	kAraN - કારણ	kAran - کارن	reason
viii.	AngaN - આંગણ	Angan - آنگن	courtyard
ix.	pahAD - પહાઽ	pahAr - پھاڑ	mountain
x.	dahAD - દહાઽ	dahAr - دھاڑ	lion roar
xi.	soDam - સોઽમ	soram - سورم	smell
xii.	kadvAS - કઽવાશ	kadvAs - کڑواس	bitterness
xiii.	mithAS - મિઠાશ	mithAs - متھاس	sweetness
xiv.	Su - શું	su - سوں	what

In example iii, the retroflex sound /L/ in vaL meaning "hair" changes to the alveolar /l/ in bAl. Similar cases are shown in iv, v and vi. In example vii, the retroflex sound /N/ in 'kAran', meaning "reason", changes to the alveolar sound /n/ in 'kAran'. A similar case is shown in example viii. In example ix, the retroflex sound /D/ in 'pahAD', meaning "mountain", changes to the alveolar sound /r/ in 'pahAr'. Similar cases are shown in examples x and xi. In example xii, the postalveolar sound /S/ in 'kadvAS', meaning "bitterness", changes to the alveolar sound /s/ in 'kadvAs'. Similar cases are shown in examples xiii and xiv.

From the above examples iii to xiv, it is observed that all of the retroflex and postalveolar sounds in Standard Gujarati changes to alveolar sounds in Alavi Bohra. This change is again due to the contact of Arabic and Persian, as the later languages do not possess retroflex and postalveolar sounds, thus they are changed to alveolar sounds in LDA.

From example i to xiv, it can be observed that, though they have borrowed words from Gujarati, the words are themselves blended with Arabic, Urdu and Persian. Thus, Alavi Bohras use an Arabisized form of Gujarati.

Example	Standard Gujarati	LDA	Meaning
xv.	cap - કપ	cup کپ ۔	cup
xvi.	barAbar - બરાબર	barobar برابر ۔	proper
xvii.	hoshiyAr - હોંશિયાર	hushiyAr ھشیار ۔	clever
xviii.	khushbU - ખુશબૂ	khushbo خش بو ۔	fragrance

In example xv, the mid vowel /a/ in 'cap', meaning "cup", changes to the close-mid vowel /u/ in 'cup', meaning "cup", when followed by a stop, similar to example xvi. In example xvi, the open vowel /A/ in 'barAbar', meaning "proper", changes to the close-mid vowel /o/ in 'barobar' when followed by a stop. The same is the case with examples xvii and xviii, where the close-mid vowel of the end vowel of /o/ changes to /u/. Thus, if open and mid-vowels are followed by a stop/plosive sound, they change to close-mid vowels.

Example	Standard Gujarati	LDA	Meaning
xix.	kem - કેમ	kim - کیم	why
xx.	em - અેમ	im - ایم	that's why
xxi.	namak - નમક	nimak - نمک	salt
xxii.	gaL - ગળ	gil - گل	swallow
xxiii.	ketla - કેટલા	kitla - کتلا	how many/much
xxiv.	etla - અેટલા	itla - اتلا	this much
xxv.	jetla - જેટલા	jitla - جتلا	that much

In example xix, the close-mid vowel /e/ in 'kem', meaning "why", changes to the close vowel /i/ in 'kim'. Similarly, in example xx, the close mid vowel changes to a close vowel when followed by the nasal sound /m/. In example xxi, the mid vowel /a/ of 'namak', meaning "salt", changes to the close vowel /i/ in 'nimak' when followed by the nasal sound /m/. Also in example xxii, the mid vowel /a/ of 'gaL', meaning "swallow", changes to the close vowel /i/ in 'gil' when followed by the alveolar sound /l/. This means that if the close-mid and mid vowels are followed by a nasal sound /m/ or alveolar sound /l/, the sound changes to a close vowel. Similarly in example xxiii, the close-mid vowel /e/ in 'ketla', meaning "how many/much", changes to the close vowel /i/ in 'kitla'. Similar cases are shown in examples xxiv and xxv. Thus, close-mid and mid vowels change to close vowels when followed by the nasal sound /m/ or alveolar sound /l/ and /t/.

Thus, from example xv to xxv, we can observe that the open vowels tend to move towards the close vowels, affecting the Gujarati lexicon.

Example	Standard Gujarati	LDA	Meaning
xxvi.	kyaare - ક્યારે	kiwaare - کیوارے	when
xxvii.	tyaare - ત્યારે	tiwaare - تیوارے	at this time/then
xxviii.	jyaare - જ્યારે	jiwaare - جیوارے	at that time/then

In example xxvi, the consonant sounds /k/ and /y/ of 'kyaare', meaning "when", are separated by the vowel sound /i/, and the consonant sound /v/ is also infixed in 'kiwaare'. Infixation is a morphological process whereby a bound morpheme attaches within a root or stem. Infixation is a very common process in Arabic. Similar cases are shown in examples xxvii and xxviii.

A distinctive feature of the Semitic languages is the triliteral or triconsonantal root, composed of three consonants separated by vowels. The basic meaning of a word is expressed by the consonants, and different shades of this basic meaning are indicated by vowel changes. This distinctive feature of Semitic languages may be affecting the Gujarati words in examples xv, xvi, and xix. Thus, this distinctive feature may also be responsible for the vowel changes in examples xv to xix.

Hence, from examples i to xxviii, we can observe that, although they have borrowed words from Gujarati, there is an impact of Arabic, Persian and Urdu due to the language contact. Also, we can say that these language contacts are affecting the Gujarati language internally.

=== Vocabulary ===
==== Semantic Change ====
Semantic change is a change in one of the meanings of a word.

Ex	Standard Gujarati	Meaning	LDA	Meaning
i.	rasoi - રસોઈ	to cook	pakAvvu - پکاوؤ	to cook/to ripen
	pakAvvu - પકાવવું	to ripen	pakAvvu - پکاوؤ	to cook/to ripen

In the above example, in standard Gujarati 'rasoi' means "to cook" and 'pakavvu' means "to ripen", and in LDA 'pakavvu' means both "to cook" and "to ripen". 'Pakna' means "to cook" as well as "to ripen" in Urdu. Here the meaning of "to ripen" is extended metaphorically. Metaphor in semantic change involves extensions in the meaning of a word that suggest a semantic similarity or connection between the new sense and the original one. Thus, due to the contact of Urdu and metaphorical extension they have dropped the word 'rasoi' and have adopted the word 'pakAvvu' to explain both the senses of to cook and to ripen.

Ex	Standard Gujarati	Meaning	LDA	Meaning
ii.	who (nominative)	I (nominative)	me (nominative) - میں	I (nominative)
	me (ergative)	I (ergative)	me (ergative) - میں	I (ergative)

In example ii, like in example i, in Gujarati 'who (nominative)' means "I" and 'me (ergative)' means "I", but in LDA, 'me' means "I" in both the cases. Also, in Urdu Language "mE" and in Persian "man" meaning "I" are used in both the cases. Thus, due to the contact of Urdu and Persian and metaphorical extension they have dropped the word 'who' and have adopted the word 'me' to explain both the senses I (nominative) and I (ergative). Thus, from example i and ii, we can observe the impact of Urdu and Persian on Gujarati through metaphorical extension.

==== Semantic borrowing ====
Semantic borrowing is the process of borrowing the entire semantic meaning from a language. Semantic borrowing occurs when two or more languages come into contact.

Ex	Standard Gujarati	Borrowed word in LDA	Meaning
i.	bhikAri - ભીખારી	faqir (Urdu) - فقیر	beggar
ii.	ghar - ઘર	makAn (Arabic) - مکان	house
iii.	sandeSo - સંદેશો	peghAm (Persian) - پیغام	message
vi.	salAh - સલાહ	nasiHat (Arabic) - نصیحۃ	advice
v.	icchA - ઇચ્છા	khwAhis (Persian) - خواھش	wish
vi.	chopdi - ચોપડી	kitAb (Urdu) - کتاب	book

Thus, from the above examples i to vi, it is observed that Alavi Bohras speak borrowed words from Arabic, Persian and Urdu. Hence, they use a particular form of Gujarati permeated with Arabic, some Persian words, and some Urdu words and write in the Arabic script called Lisaan ud-Da'wat il-'Alaviyah. This unique language makes the Alavi Bohras linguistically different from other Bohra sects.

=== Recognition ===
After the 21st Faatemi Imam Maulaana at-Taiyeb went into seclusion in 528 AH/1134 CE from Egypt, his deputy, legatee and vicegerent, who is called the Da'i (a spiritual head or a missionary working on the divine command of Imam in seclusion), started a religious mission in the name of Imam at-Taiyeb for the purpose of self-searching and purity wherever Isma'ili-Taiyebi people were staying. This mission came to be known as "ad-Da'wat ul-Haadiyat ut-Taiyebiyah-الدعوۃ الهادیۃ الطیبیۃ" meaning "The Rightly Guided Mission of Imam at-Taiyeb". This religious mission continued in Yemen between 532–974 AH (1138–1567 AD), from the first Da'i Saiyedna Zoeb till the 24th Da'i Saiyedna Yusuf having official language Arabic. During this period, as the time demanded and need arose, many Waali-Mullas (the representatives of Da'i who in his absence is entitled to do all religious activities) were appointed to teach in the Madrasah Taiyebiyah all aspects of the religious and social knowledge to the people. At each place where the Isma'ili-Taiyebi community resided, there used to be a learned and pious mulla who conducted various classes of religious teachings-dars and halqah with different groups of students under the direct guidance of the Yemeni Da'i.

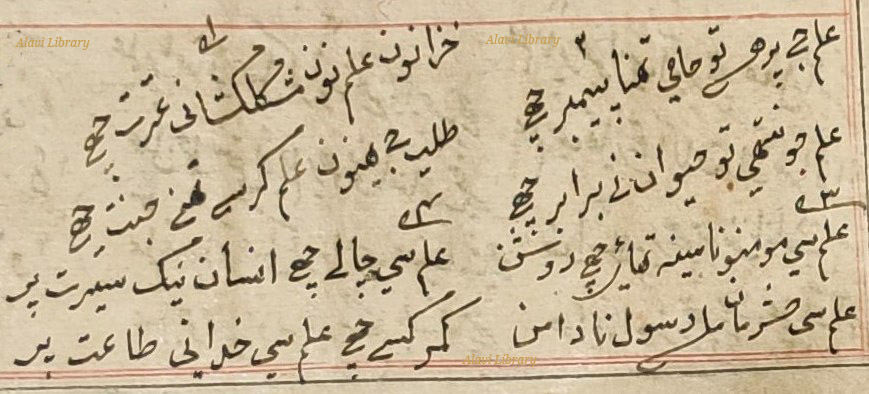
41st Da'i Saiyedna Jivabhai Fakhruddin saheb wrote this poem (bayt) on acquiring Knowledge in 1914 AD in his anthology Diwaan e Haseen in LDA

As the Isma'ili-Taiyebis, residing in Gujarat (Ahmedabad) and nearby areas were very enterprising, enthusiastic, progressive and soulfully involved in business and accordingly in their daily affairs and conduct, they were called "Bohras" (excellent or unique community). Because of their lineage to the 21st Imam at-Taiyeb, they came to be known as Isma'ili Taiyebi Bohras. In the 9th and 10th century AH, a special delegation used to come to Gujarat from Yemen, where Arabic was in vogue, and teach the local Waali-Mulla by giving necessary instruction from the Da'i, conduct examinations, inspect the madrasahs, and teach Arabic to smart students. Some of these students were sent to Yemen to acquire higher religious education under the inspection of the Da'i himself. This way the trade and social relations between Yemen, Hind and Sindh became stronger and the lingual expressions, dialects and accents of Arabic, Persian, Urdu and Gujarati got mixed together. Keeping the main structure of the Gujarati language intact, normally Arabic, Persian and Urdu words were introduced by the learned people and gradually the community as a whole began using them in their daily and routine conversations.

After the demise of 24th Da’i in Yemen, the seat or the centre of this religious mission, ad-Da’wat ul-Haadiyat ut-Taiyebiyah, in 975 AH/1567 AD was transferred to Ahmedabad. And from the time of 25th Da’i, Saiyedna Jalaal when he took the reign of Da’wat (mission), the Arabicized Gujarati language took the forefront in recognizing the micro-minority community i.e. Bohras to the masses in Western India and it was exclusively spoken by them. This Arabic-blended fantastic offshoot of Gujarati Language survived and its vocabulary prospered because of an active involvement, direct patronage and encouragement from the Da’i. The 31st Alavi Da'i Saiyedna Hasan Badruddin (d. 1090AH/1679 AD) of Ahmedabad noted for his anthology in Arabic also wrote Fa'al-Naamah in LDA. This book gives a clear idea that apart from Arabic, Persian too had a huge influence on the lexicon of LDA.

In Vadodara, 41st Da'i al-Mutlaq Saiyedna Jivabhai Fakhruddin (d. 1347 AH/1929 AD) wrote many poems in LDA, some of them are recited regularly by Alavi Bohras "Aye Mumino socho zara, duniyaa che aa daar e fanaa" (O ye believer, this worldly life is but temporary) and "Khazaano ilm no mushkil-kushaa ni itrat che" (The treasure of knowledge is the progeny of Ali ibn Abi Talib, the legatee of Muhammad). Apart from this 35th Da'i al-Mutlaq Saiyedna Noorbhai Nuruddin (d. 1178 AH/1764 AD) in Surat compiled as-Sahifat un-Nooraaniyah having detailed explanation of Ritual Purity (wuzu) and Prayer (namaaz) with supplications along with Q&A of Isma'ili jurisprudence in LDA.

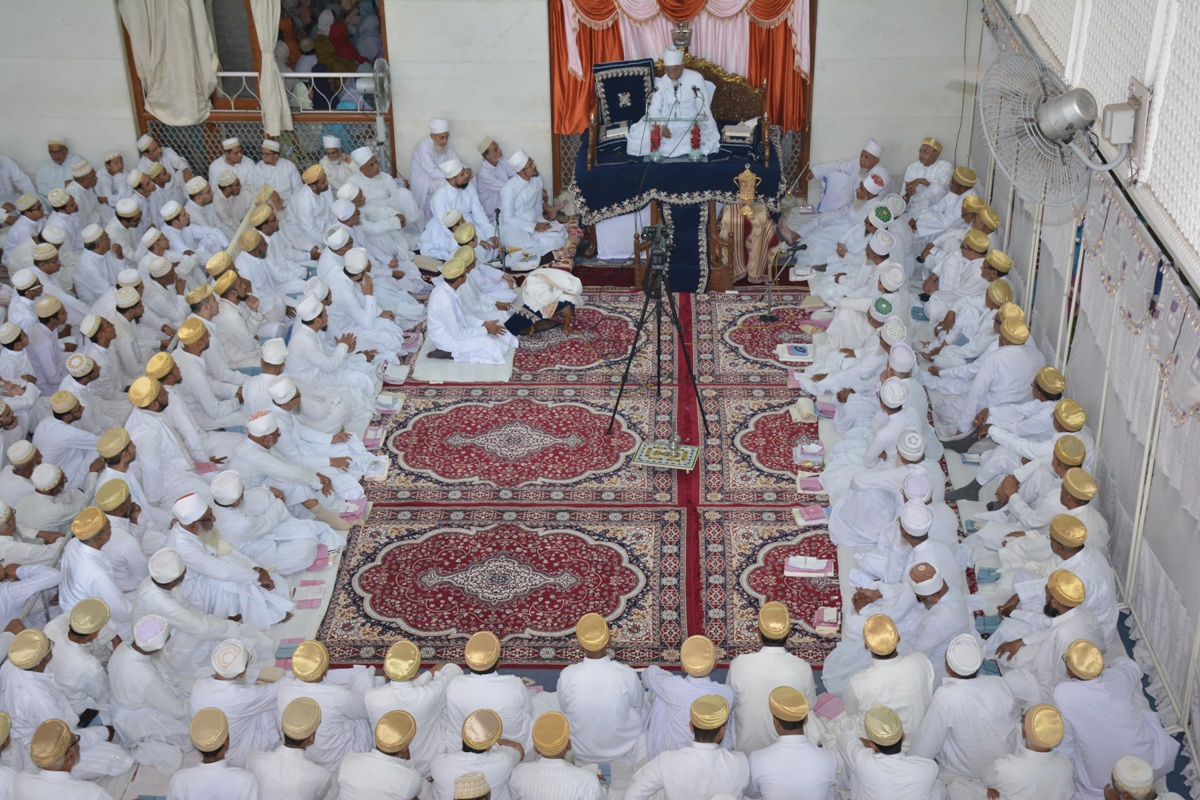
Aqaa Maulaa delivering a lecture in LDA in 2016 AD

=== Writing system ===
LDA is basically inspired and based on the 28-letter alphabet of Arabic. Because the missionaries had to deal with local people in Gujarat for trade and religious affairs, they included 16 other letters of Gujarati for better communication and expression. LDA thus contained 44 letters. From these, three independent letters, Pe-پ (પ), Che-چ (ચ), and Ghaaf-گ (ગ), are widely used to incorporate Gujarati, Persian and Urdu terminology that cannot be written in the Arabic alphabet. Three other letters modified from Arabic that are used exclusively for Gujarati words are ٹ ,ڈ, and ڑ (ઽ,ટ).

Thirteen other letters are from the Haa-ھ family. "Haa" is mixed with different letters to get letters of different languages, such as baa-haa (بھ,ભ), baa-taa (تھ,થ), baa-ţaa (ٹھ,ઠ), pe-haa (پھ,ફ), jeem-haa (جھ,ઝ), che-haa (چھ,છ), daal-haa (دھ,ધ), ďaal-haa (ڈھ,ઙ), kaaf-haa (کھ,ખ), and gaaf-haa (گھ,ઘ).

28 Arabic letters used in LDA:

Sr. No.	LDA		Example			Equivalent letters	
Sr. No.	Letter	Transliteration	Example	Transliteration	Translation	Gujarati	English
1.	ا	Alif	اللہ	Allaah	The Almighty	અ	A
2.	ب	Baa (be)	باب	Baab	Door	બ	B
3.	ت	Taa (te)	تمام	Tamaam	Complete	ત	T
4.	ث	Ṯhaa (se)	ثمر	Ṯhamar	Fruit	સ઼઼	Ṯ
5.	ج	Jeem	جلال	Jalaal	Glory	જ	J
6.	ح	Ḥaa (he)	حسد	Ḥasad	Jealousy	હ઼	Ḥ
7.	خ	Khaa (khe)	خادم	Khaadim	Servant	ખ઼	Ḵh
8.	د	Daal	دراز	Daraaz	Long	દ	D
9.	ذ	Ḍhaal (zaal)	ذخيره	Dhakheerah	Treasure	ઝ્	Ḍh
10.	ر	Raa (re)	رحمة	Rahmat	Grace	ર	R
11.	ز	Zay (ze)	زمين	Zameen	Land	ઝ	Z
12.	س	Seen	سحر	Sahar	Morning	સ	S
13.	ش	Sheen	شکر	Shukr	Thanks-giving	શ	Sh
14.	ص	Ṣaad (suad)	صبر	Ṣabr	Patience	સ્	Ṣ
15.	ض	Ẓaad (zuaad)	ضمانة	Ẓamaanat	Security	ઝ઼	Ẓ
16.	ط	Ṭoe	طاقة	Ṭaaqat	Strength	ત઼	Ṭ
17.	ظ	Żoe	ظالم	Żaalim	Tyrant	ઝં	Ż
18.	ع	'Ain	عقل	'Aql	Intellect	અ્	'A
19.	غ	Ghain	غلط	Ghalat	Wrong	ગ	Gh
20.	ف	Faa (fe)	فجر	Fajar	Dawn	ફ	F
21.	ق	Qaaf	قلم	Qalam	Pen	ક઼	Q
22.	ك	Kaaf	كرم	Karam	Blessing	ક	K
23.	ل	Laam	لب	Lab	Lips	લ	L
24.	م	Meem	مال	Maal	Money	મ	M
25.	ن	Nun	نجم	Najm	Star	ન	N
26.	ه	Haa (he)	هفته	Haftah	Week	હ	H
27.	و	Waaw	وزن	Wazan	Weight	વ	W
28.	ي	Yaa (ye)	ياد	Yaad	Remembrance	ય	Y

6 letters of different languages used in LDA:

Sr. No.	LDA		Example			Equivalent letters	
Sr. No.	Letter	Transliteration	LDA	Transliteration	Translation	Gujarati	English
29.	ٹ	Ťe	ٹامٹو	Ťaameto	Tomato	ટ	Ť
30.	ڈ	Ďaal	ڈاڑم	Ďařam	Pomegranate	ડ	Ď
31.	ڑ	Řaa	پھاڑ	Pahaař	Mountain	ઙ	Ř
32.	پ	Pe	پنکھو	Pankho	Fan	પ	P
33.	چ	Che	چکلي	Chakli	Sparrow	ચ	Ch
34.	گ	Gaaf	گاي	Gaai	Cow	ગ	G

10 Gujarati letters derived from the Haa (ﻫ) family used in LDA:

Sr. No.	LDA		Example			Equivalent letters	
Sr. No.	Letter	Transliteration	LDA	Transliteration	Translation	Equivalent letter in Gujarati	Equivalent letter in English
35.	بھ	Bha	بھاري	Bhaari	Heavy	ભ	Bh
36.	تھ	Tha	تھالي	Thaali	Plate	થ	Th
37.	ٹھ	Ťha	ٹھوکر	Ťhokar	Stumbling	ઠ	Ťh
38.	پھ	Pha	پھول	Phool	Flower	ફ	Ph
39.	جھ	Jha	جھنڈو	Jhando	Flag	ઝ	Jh
40.	چھ	Cha	چھاتي	Chaati	Chest	છ	Ch
41.	دھ	Dha	دهومو	Dhumo	Smoke	ધ	Dh
42.	ڈھ	Ďha	ڈهكن	Ďhakkan	Lid	ઢ	Ďh
43.	كھ	Kha	كھيتر	Khaytar	Farm	ખ	Kh
44.	گھ	Gha	گھر	Ghar	House	ઘ	Gh

== Language Influence on Names ==
Humans devised names to identify different things. The 99 beautiful names - al-Asmaa ul-Husnaa - described in the holy Qur'an and assigned to Allah are in fact the qualities of His representative-Prophet who will spiritually elevate a believer in the eyes of Allah for his eternal journey. These Prophets from Adam till Mohammad, has names either in Hebrew or in Arabic. In the beginning of Islam, among Arabs and non-Arabs in and around Arabian peninsula, Muslims followed the tradition of naming their children after the names of Prophets, their companions, historic events and places, honorific titles of learned men, Qur'anic words etc. This tradition continued in almost all sects of Islam.

After the seclusion of 21st Fatimid Musta'alavi Imam at-Taiyeb from Cairo in 528 AH, his missionaries-Du'aat in Yemen carried forward this tradition with the addition of naming the children after the Fatimid Imams, their titles and companions. The representatives-Wulaat of Yemeni missionaries in India named their children after their masters-du’aat. But around the tenure of 19th Da'i al Mutlaq Idrees Imaaduddin, apart from traditional names, in India local names of Gujarati communities got introduced and included in Bohra society. From then onwards, these names without having any religious, political or cultural identity became an integral part of Lisaan ud Da'wat. These names have travelled down to many generations and till now Alavi Bohras name their children keeping alive their ancestral legacy.

To cite an example, we will first examine the non-Islamic names of the authorities in different religious hierarchies attached directly with the affairs and service of the Rightly Guided Mission- ad-Da'wat ul-Haadiyah.

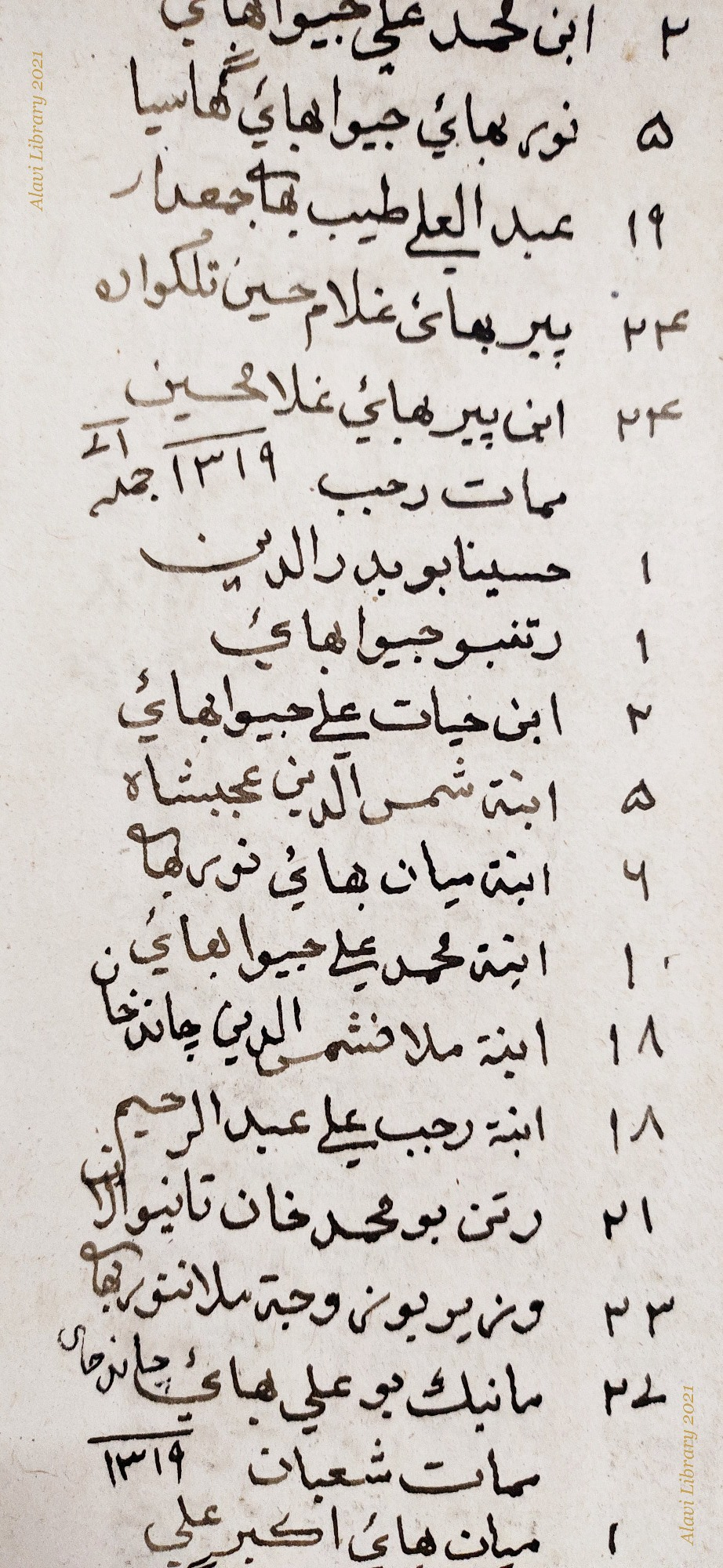
Names of Alavi Bohras (birth-death) recorded in a registry during the time of 41st & 42nd Da'i. These are the names of 1319 AH/1901 AD

Status		Name			Period		Description
Latin script	LDA	Latin script	LDA	Gujarati	AH	AD	Description
Maulaai	مولائي	Bhaarmal & Taarmal	بھارمل انے تارمل	ભારમલ અને તારમલ	487 AH	1094 AD	Viziers of Siddhraj Jaisinh, the ruler of Patan
Maulaai	مولائي	Kalaan (Khwaaja)	کلان) خواجہ)	કલાન (ખ્વાજા)	810 AH	1407 AD	Settled in newly built Ahmedabad
Miya	میاں	Maamji	مامجي	મામજી	970 AH	1562 AD	Martyred while doing ablution in Ahmedabad
Maulaai	مولائي	Khawj	خوج	ખૌજ	1009 AH	1600 AD	Historian of 26th & 27th Ahmedabadi missionary in Kapadwanj
Maulaai	مولائي	Raajan	راجن	રાજન	960 AH	1533 AD	Remained in the service of 24th Yemeni missionary
Ustaaz	استاذ	Shaahuji	شاھوجي	શાહૂજી	997 AH	1588 AD	Teacher of 27th Ahmedabadi missionary
Saiyedna	سیدنا	Jivabhai	جیوا بھائي	જીવાભાઈ	1090 AH	1679 AD	Name of 32nd missionary of Vadodara
Maa sahebah	ماں صاحبہ	Qibu	قیبو	કીબુ	1320 AH	1902 AD	Mother of 41st missionary of Vadodara
Maa sahebah	ماں صاحبہ	Raanibu	راني بو	રાનીબુ	1361 AH	1942 AD	Wife of 42nd missionary of Vadodara

Apart from the dignitaries whose names find mention in the Alavi historical accounts, there are many such names found till date among the common Alavi Bohras who name their children as per the names of their ancestors to keep their memories alive. Before the migration to Vadodara, Alavi Bohras had names suffixed with either "Khaan" or " Ji" or " Shaah", but after migration in 1110AH/1698 AD this trend gradually got transformed into "Bhai".

Male	LDA	Gujarati	Female	Gujarati	LDA
Raaj	راج	રાજ	Jibu	જીબુ	جیبو
Kikabhai	کیکا بھائي	કીકાભાઈ	Buji	બુજી	بوجي
Chaandji	چاندجي	ચાંદજી	Maanek	માણેક	مانک
Abuji	أبوجي	અબુજી	Ratan	રતન	رتن
Jivan	جیون	જીવન	Khaatoon	ખાતૂન	خاتون
Musanji	موسنجي	મુસનજી	Khursheed	ખુરશીદ	خورشید
Taajkhan	تاجخان	તાજખાન	Hira	હીરા	ھیرا
Khanji	خانجي	ખાનજી	Mithan	મીઠન	میٹھن

== First Documented Work ==
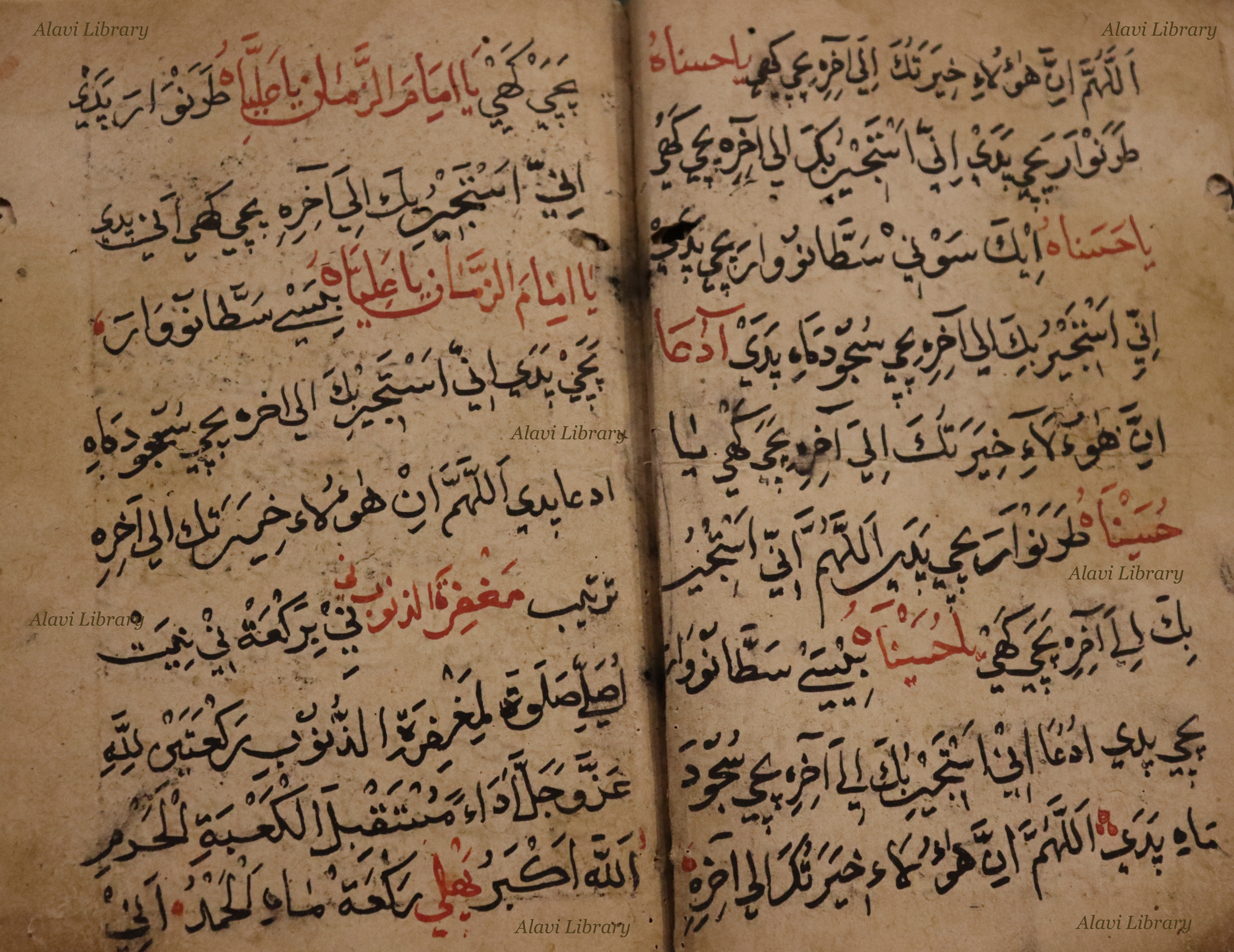
One of the First Document having instructions in LDA

The missionaries-Du'aat of Ahmedabad has a distinction over the Du'aat of Yemen. Yemeni missionaries had their mother tongue Arabic and thus the literature of Taiyebi Isma'ilism between 532 and 975 AH/1138-1568 AD has been entirely written in Arabic. The same sectarian literature was taught in religious schools-madrasahs under the direct supervision of Da'i al-Mutlaq to not only Yemeni people but also to those who had come from western India to acquire knowledge of different theological branches. Clever and dedicated Indian students were elevated to some status and were gradually assigned Da'wah services in India. Those scholars or designated people-Maulaai who came back to India brought with them the Yemeni Da'wah Arabic.

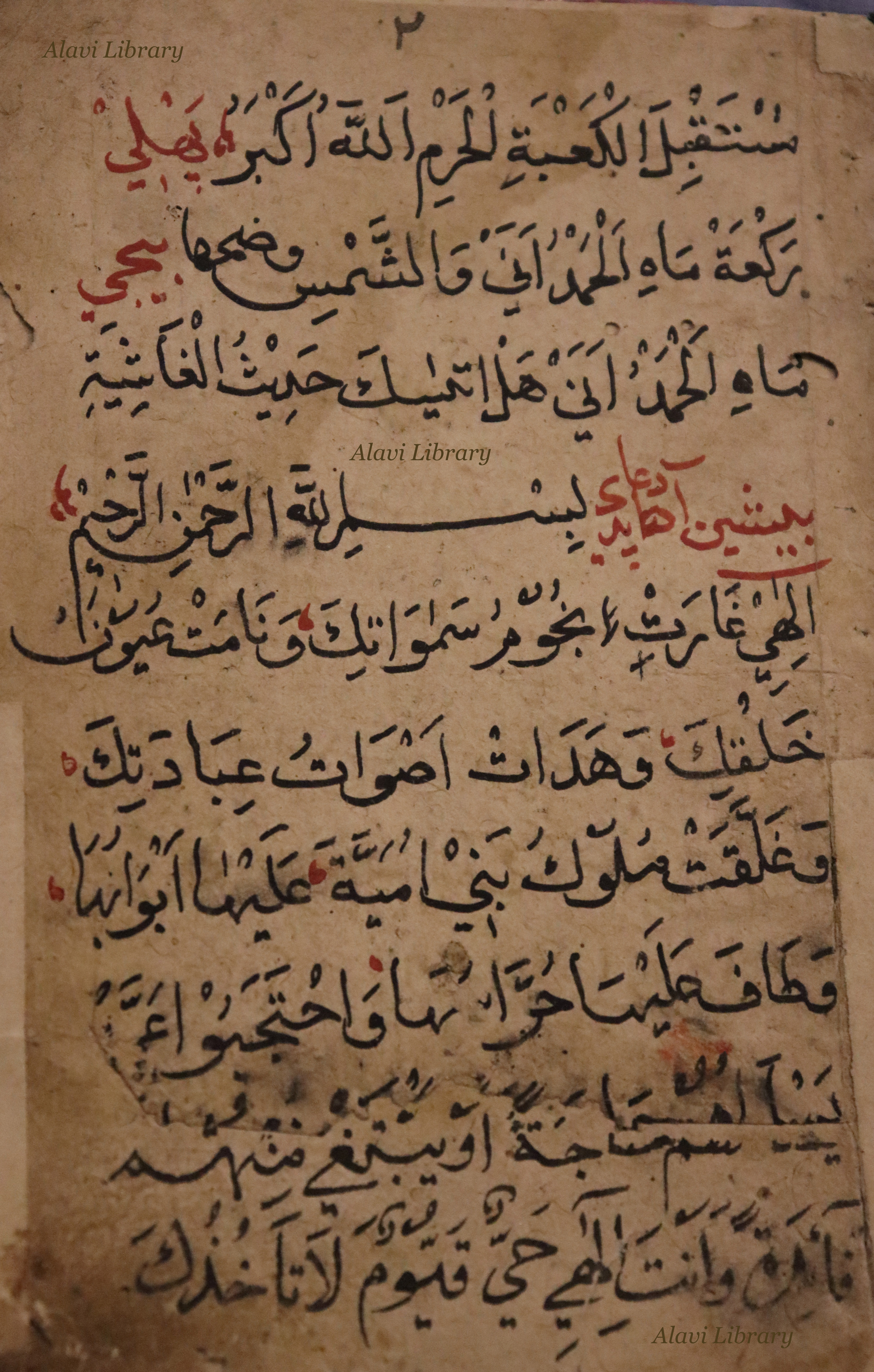
Another page from the same work

These learned men taught in turn the fundamentals of Taiyebi faith wrapped in the multi-lingual robe. When the 25th Da'i al-Mutlaq Saiyedna Jalaal Fakhruddin (d. 975 AH/1567 AD) was in Ahmedabad and his predecessor was on the throne of Da'wat in Yemen, the last batch of Maulaai from Ahmedabad and other towns were given guidance and training to shoulder the responsibilities of Taiyebi Bohra community. Now the seat and centre of Da'wat e Haadiyah was going to be shifted from Yemen to Ahmedabad. 25th, 26th and 27th Da'is were among the last missionaries to get an opportunity to study in Yemen. They then ordered scholars to teach clever followers Arabic, Persian and Urdu. At that time there were at least 140 places in and around Gujarat where all branches of learning were taught in madrasahs to Bohra students. To make religious learning more simple and understandable, scholars made serious efforts in using Gujarati as a medium of communication with masses and thus giving it a new form as Arabicized Gujarati. As the case with many languages, it was initially verbal then got documented and written in many works of missionaries. It was not the work of a day or two, but it took one and a half century to reach its peak. This coincided with the Mughal control over Gujarat in the 17th century AD.

Pictured are pages taken from "Sahifat us Salaat" (Book for the Understanding of Prayer) written by the pupil of 29th Da'i al-Mutlaq Ali Shamsuddin (d. 1046 AH/1637 AD) in Ahmedabad during the time of his grandfather 28th Da'i al-Mutlaq Shaikh Aadam Safiyuddin (d. 1030 AH/1621 AD) in 1025 AH/1616 AD.

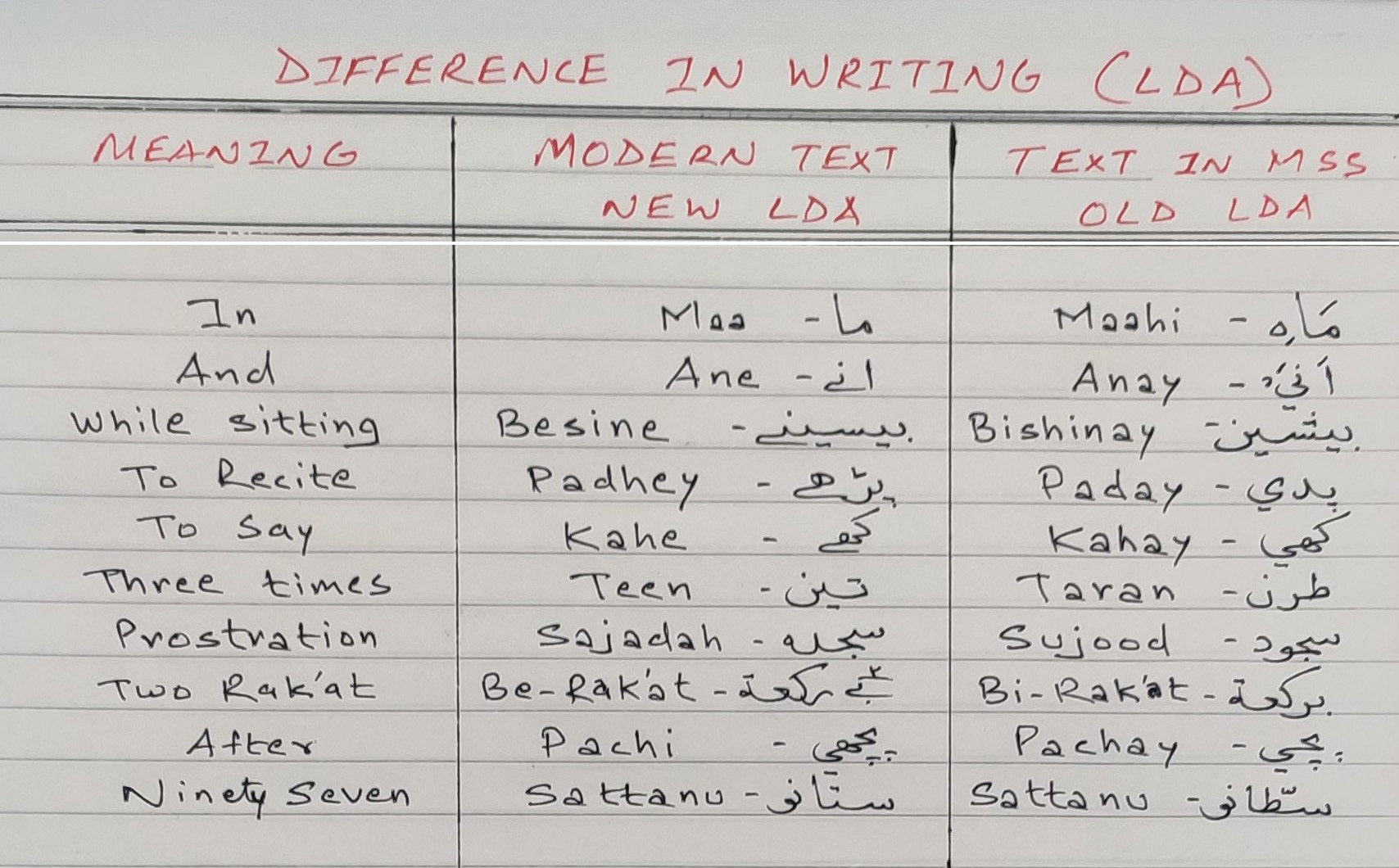
Understanding of some the words of LDA used in the said MSS having old style of writing

== See also ==
- Old Gujarati language
