= Code page 1006 =

Character encoding for Urdu

Code page 1006 (CCSID 1006), also known as ISO 8-bit Urdu, is used by IBM in its AIX operating system in Pakistan for Urdu.

== Code page layout ==
Code page 1006
	0	1	2	3	4	5	6	7	8	9	A	B	C	D	E	F
2x	SP	!	"	#	$	٪	&	'	(	)	٭	+	,	-	.	/
3x	0	1	2	3	4	5	6	7	8	9	:	;	<	=	>	?
4x	@	A	B	C	D	E	F	G	H	I	J	K	L	M	N	O
5x	P	Q	R	S	T	U	V	W	X	Y	Z	[	\	]		_
6x	`	a	b	c	d	e	f	g	h	i	j	k	l	m	n	o
7x	p	q	r	s	t	u	v	w	x	y	z	{	|	}	~	
8x																
9x																
Ax	NBSP	٠	١	٢	٣	٤	٥	٦	۷	٨	٩	،	؛	SHY	؟	آ
Bx	ﺍ	ﺎ		ب	ﺑ	ﭖ	ﭘ	ة	ت	ﺗ	ﭦ	ﭨ	ث	ﺛ	ج	ﺟ
Cx	ﭺ	ﭼ	ح	ﺣ	خ	ﺧ	د	ﮈ	ذ	ر	ﮌ	ز	ﮊ	س	ﺳ	ش
Dx	ﺷ	ص	ﺻ	ض	ﺿ	ط	ظ	ع	ﻊ	ﻋ	ﻌ	غ	ﻎ	ﻏ	ﻐ	ف
Ex	ﻓ	ق	ﻗ	ﮎ	ﻛ	ﮒ	ﮔ	ل	ﻟ	ﻠ	م	ﻣ	ﮞ	ن	ﻧ	ؤ
Fx	و	ﮦ	ﮨ	ﮩ	ﮪ	ء	ﺉ	ﺊ	ﺋ	ﯼ	ﯽ	ﯾ	ﮰ	ﮮ	ّ	ﹽ

Not in Unicode, mapped to private use area
