= Code page 868 =

Computer character set for Urdu

- MIME / IANA: IBM868
- Alias(es): CP868, cp-ar

Code page 868 (CCSID 868) (also known as CP 868, IBM 00868) is a code page used to write Urdu in Pakistan.

== Character set ==
The following table shows code page 868. Each character is shown with its equivalent Unicode code point. Only the second half of the table (code points 128–255) is shown, the first half (code points 0–127) being the same as code page 437, except for code point 37 (25_{hex}) which is defined as U+066A ARABIC PERCENT SIGN ⟨٪⟩ instead of U+0025 PERCENT SIGN ⟨%⟩.

Code page 868
	0	1	2	3	4	5	6	7	8	9	A	B	C	D	E	F
8x	۰	۱	۲	۳	۴	۵	۶	۷	۸	۹	،	؛	؟	ﺁ	ﺍ	ﺎ
9x	ﻟ (Note: Left half of the LAM-ALIF ligature.)	ﺏ	ﺑ	ﭖ	ﭘ	ﺓ	ﺕ	ﺗ	ﭦ	ﭨ	ﺙ	ﺛ	ﺝ	ﺟ	ﭺ	ﭼ
Ax	ﺡ	ﺣ	ﺥ	ﺧ	ﺩ	ﮈ	ﺫ	ﺭ	ﮌ	ﺯ	ﮊ	ﺱ	ﺳ	ﺵ	«	»
Bx	░	▒	▓	│	┤	ﺷ	ﺹ	ﺻ	ﺽ	╣	║	╗	╝	ﺿ	ﻃ	┐
Cx	└	┴	┬	├	─	┼	ﻇ	ﻉ	╚	╔	╩	╦	╠	═	╬	ﻊ
Dx	ﻋ	ﻌ	ﻍ	ﻎ	ﻏ	ﻐ	ﻑ	ﻓ	ﻕ	┘	┌	█	▄	ﻗ	ﮎ	▀
Ex	ﻛ	ﮒ	ﮔ	ﻝ	ﻟ	ﻠ	ﻡ	ﻣ	ﮞ	ﻥ	ﻧ	ﺅ	ﻭ	ﮦ	ﮨ	ﮩ
Fx	SHY	ﮪ	ﺀ	ﺉ	ﺊ	ﺋ	ﯼ	ﯽ	ﯾ	ﮰ	ﮮ	ﹼ	ﹽ		■	NBSP
