= ڱ =

Arabic script letter used in Sindhi

ڱ, Arabic letter ngoeh (U+06B1), is an additional letter of the Arabic script, not used in the Arabic alphabet itself but used in Sindhi to represent a voiced velar nasal, [ŋ]. For example, it is used in آڱُر meaning 'finger'. It is written as ङ in Sindhi's Devanagari script.

== Forms ==
The Arabic letter Ngoeh, or ڱ, has 4 forms in total. They are:

Position in word	Isolated	Final	Medial	Initial
Glyph form: (Help)	ڱ	ـڱ	ـڱـ	ڱـ

== See also ==
- گهہ
- ٻ
- ڄ
- ڳ
