= Lam with tah above =

Arabic script character

Lām with small tah above
- ࣇ

Usage
- Writing system: Arabic script
- Type: Abjad
- Language of origin: Punjabi, Kalasha-mun
- Sound values: [ɭ] [ɫ]
- In Unicode: U+08C7

History
- Development: ل: ࣇ
- Transliterations: ळ ਲ਼ ಳ ળ

Other
- Writing direction: Right-to-Left

Lām with tah above (ࣇ, also known as "Arabic letter Lām with small Tah above" or "arlām") is a character used in the Shahmukhi alphabet for the Punjabi language to represent a voiced retroflex lateral approximant and is also used in the Kalasha language.

The Gurmukhi equivalent of the letter is ਲ਼. This was added to Gurmukhi officially relatively recently, and is not universal, but does have a precedent for use in older Punjabi texts.

It was added to Unicode in 2020 (in version 13). Due to the recency of this addition, support is still limited among widely fonts. It is possible to approximate the letter using the character combination لؕ. The character is the sole member of the script group "Arabic letter for Punjabi."

== History ==
The earliest source which attested a use of an arlam glyph identified in discussions of the proposed Unicode character was Muhammad Yar's 1792 Afarinish Nama. Though present in some older works, most writing historically has not included a character for the Punjabi phoneme it represents, and there are other characters which writers have used to represent this sound in the absence of a standard for it. Gurmeet Kaur's 2017 'Fascinating Folktales of Punjab' was printed with a version of the lam glyph with a dot beneath, mirroring the differentiation present on lalle pair bindi in Gurmukhi.

== Forms ==
Position	Isolated	Final	Medial	Initial
Image				
Text	ࣇ	ـࣇ	ـࣇـ	ࣇـ

== Character encoding ==
Character information
Preview	ࣇ	
Unicode name	ARABIC LETTER LAM WITH SMALL ARABIC LETTER TAH ABOVE	
Encodings	decimal	hex
Unicode	2247	U+08C7
UTF-8	224 163 135	E0 A3 87
Numeric character reference	&#2247;	&#x8C7;

== Font support ==
As of August 2026, these font families support U+08C7:

- PakType
- NoName Fixed
- Noto Nastaliq Urdu
- Scheherazade New
- Lateef
- Awami Nastaliq
- Gulzar

== See also ==
- ٹ
- ݨ
- ڈ
- ڑ
