= ݨ =

Additional letter of the Arabic script

ݨ, (Arabic letter noon with small tah (U+0768), ṇūṇ), is an additional letter of the Arabic script, not used in the Arabic alphabet itself but used in Shahmukhi Punjabi, and Shina to represent a retroflex nasal consonant, [ɳ].

ڼ is the twenty-ninth letter of Pashto alphabet. It represents the retroflex nasal letter (IPA: [ɳ]) or Ṇ in Latin Alphabets, which is ण in Devanagari and ਣ in Gurmukhi. In Sindhi, ڻ is used.

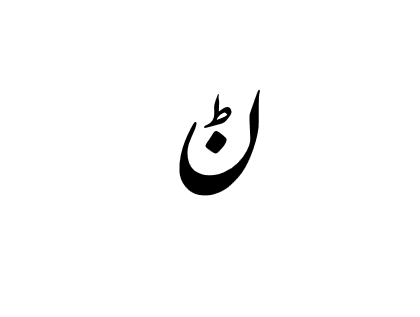
In Nastaliq font.

The Unicode for the letter ݨ was approved in 2005 and is used since version 4.1. Shahmukhi uses the letter ⟨ݨ⟩ for /ɳ/. Previously, ڑن was used to represent a voiced retroflex nasal.

It is a compound of nūn and ṛe ⟨ڑ⟩, for example:

کݨ مݨ، چھݨ چھݨ۔

== Forms ==
Position in word:	Isolated	Final	Medial	Initial
Glyph form: (Help)	ݨ	ـݨ	ـݨـ	ݨـ

== Nastaliq ==
Along with Naskh, this letter is also supported in the Nastaliq font.

== See also ==
- ٹ
- ڈ
- ڑ
- ڻ
- ں
- ٻ
- ڄ
- ݙ
- ڳ
- ڱ
