= Ghey =

Sindhi-Arabic letter

گهہ (ghey), is the 43rd letter of the modified Perso-Arabic Sindhi alphabet. It is a combination of multiple letters and is used in Sindhi to represent the breathy affricate velar (ɡʱ). It is represented in the Sindhi Devanagari script by 'घ'. For example, it is used in گهاگھہ meaning 'of old age'.

== Forms ==
It has four forms in total. They are:

Position in word:	Isolated	Final	Medial	Initial
Glyph form: (Help)	گھـ	ـگھـ	ـگھــ	گھــ

== See also ==
- ٻ
- ڄ
- ڳ
