= ݙ =

Additional letter of the Arabic script

ݙ is an additional letter of the Arabic script, not used in the Arabic alphabet itself but used in Saraiki to represent a voiced alveolar implosive, [ɗ]. Its other form is also found in Saraiki as spoken in Multan in the form of voiced retroflex implosive, [ᶑ].

It is written as ॾ in Saraiki and Sindhi's Devanagari orthography. It is derived from the letter ḍāl (ڈ), which is used to represent the [ɖ], and two dots below to represent implosion (as in Sindhi). The Unicode character for ݙ was approved in 2005.

== Forms ==
The letter ݙ has 2 forms.

Position in word:	Isolated	Final	Medial	Initial
Naskh glyph form: (Help)	ݙ	ـݙ	ـݙ	ݙ
Nastaliq glyph form:	ݙ	ــــݙ	ــــݙ	ݙ

== See also ==
- ٻ
- ڄ
- ڳ
- ݨ
