= Punjabi alphabet =

Punjabi alphabet may refer to the:

- Gurmukhī alphabet, the sacred and standard Indic script
- Shahmukhi alphabet, the traditional Perso-Arabic based script
