= Shahmukhi =

Script used to write the Punjabi language

Shahmukhi شاہ مُکھی
- Shahmukhi alphabets
- Script type: Abjad
- Period: early 17th century–present
- Direction: Right-to-left script
- Region: Punjab, Hazara, Azad Kashmir
- Languages: Punjabi (incl. dialects and varieties)

Related scripts
- Parent systems: Egyptian hieroglyphs: Proto-Sinaitic; Phoenician; Aramaic; Nabataean; Arabic; Perso-Arabic; Shahmukhi

Unicode
- Unicode range: U+0600 to U+06FF; U+0750 to U+077F; U+08A0 to U+08FF; U+FB50 to U+FDFF; U+FE70 to U+FEFF

Shahmukhi (Shahmukhi: شاہ مُکھی, pronounced [ʃäː(ɦ)˦.mʊ.kʰiː], lit. 'from the Shah's or King's mouth', Gurmukhī: ਸ਼ਾਹਮੁਖੀ) is the right-to-left abjad-based script developed from the Perso-Arabic alphabet used for the Punjabi language varieties, predominantly in Punjab, Pakistan. It is generally written in the Nastaʿlīq calligraphic hand, which is also used for Persian and Urdu. Shahmukhi is one of the two standard scripts used for Punjabi, the other being Gurmukhī used mainly in Punjab, India. Shahmukhi is written from right to left and has 36 primary letters with some other additional letters.

== History ==
Before the advent of Shahmukhi, writing systems were not popular for the Old Punjabi varieties.

The name 'Shahmukhi' is a recent coinage, imitating its counterpart 'Gurmukhī'. However, the writing of Punjabi in the Perso-Arabic script is well-attested from the early 17th century onwards. According to Dhavan, Punjabi began to adopt the script as a "side effect" of educational practices in Mughal-era Punjab, when Punjabi Muslims learned the Persian language in order to participate in Mughal society. Educational materials taught Persian to Punjabi speakers by using Punjabi written in Persian's alphabet, which was a novel innovation. This was one of the first attempts at standardising the Punjabi language; prior to this, Punjabi was primarily a spoken language, not formally taught in schools.

Shackle suggests that the Gurmukhī script was not favoured by Punjabi Muslims due to its religious (Sikh) connotations. Shahmukhi Punjabi was added to Google Translate in 2024.

== Alphabet ==
Shahmukhi script is a modified version of the Arabic script's Persian alphabet. It is identical to the Urdu alphabet, but contains additional letters representing the Punjabi phonology. For writing Saraiki, an extended Shahmukhi is used that includes 4 additional letters for the implosive consonants (ٻ, ڄ, ݙ, ڳ).

=== Vowel diacritics ===
Like Urdu, Shahmukhi also has diacritics, which are implied - a convention retained from the original Arabic script, to express short vowels.

Diacritics used in Shahmukhi
Name	Symbol	Usage	IPA	Notes	Examples
Short vowels
Zabar	◌َ	a	[ə]	Written above a letter	
Zer	◌ِ	i	[ɪ]	Written below a letter	
Pesh	◌ُ	u	[ʊ]	Written above a letter	
Nūn Ġunna	◌٘	ṉ	[◌̃], [ŋ]	Nasal vowel diacritic	‘مُون٘ہہ’ (‘face’)
Tashdīd	◌ّ	Geminate	[ː]	Doubles a consonant - goes above the letter being prolonged	‘کّ’ ('kk')
Loan diacritics
Khaṛī Zabar	◌ٰ	á	[äː]	Used in certain Arabic loanwords only	‘عیسیٰ’ (‘Jesus’)
Zabar Tanwīn	◌ً	an	[ən]	Used in certain Arabic loanwords only	‘فوراً’ (‘Immediately’)
Other diacritics
Hamza	◌ٔ	varied		Indicates a diphthong between two vowels, examples such as: ‘ئ’, ‘ۓ’, ‘ؤ‘, and أ , not written as a separate diacritic	

=== Consonants ===
No.	Name		IPA	Final glyph	Medial glyph	Initial glyph	Isolated glyph
1	الف	alif	/äː/, /ə/, /ɪ/, /ʊ/	ـا	ـا	ا	ا
2	بے	bē	/b/	ـب	ـبـ	بـ	ب
3	پے	pē	/p/	ـپ	ـپـ	پـ	پ
4	تے	tē	/t/	ـت	ـتـ	تـ	ت
5	ٹے	ṭē	/ʈ/	ـٹ	ـٹـ	ٹـ	ٹ
6	ثے	s̱ē	/s/	ـث	ـثـ	ثـ	ث
7	جيم	jīm	/d͡ʒ/	ـج	ـجـ	جـ	ج
8	چے	cē	/t͡ʃ/	ـچ	ـچـ	چـ	چ
9	وڈّی حے	waḍḍi ḥē	/ɦ/	ـح	ـحـ	حـ	ح
10	خے	k͟hē	/x/	ـخ	ـخـ	خـ	خ
11	دال	dāl	/d/	ـد	ـد	د	د
12	ڈال	ḍāl	/ɖ/	ـڈ	ـڈ	ڈ	ڈ
13	ذال	ẕāl	/z/	ـذ	ـذ	ذ	ذ
14	رے	rē	/r/	ـر	ـر	ر	ر
15	ڑے	ṛē	/ɽ/	ـڑ	ـڑ	ڑ	ڑ
16	زے	zē	/z/	ـز	ـز	ز	ز
17	ژے	žē	/ʒ/	ـژ	ـژ	ژ	ژ
18	سین	sīn	/s/	ـس	ـسـ	سـ	س
19	شین	shīn	/ʃ/	ـش	ـشـ	شـ	ش
20	صاد	ṣwād	/s/	ـص	ـصـ	صـ	ص
21	ضاد	ẓwād	/z/	ـض	ـضـ	ضـ	ض
22	طوئیں	t̤oʼēṉ	/t/	ـط	ـطـ	طـ	ط
23	ظوئیں	z̤oʼēṉ	/z/	ـظ	ـظـ	ظـ	ظ
24	عین	ʻain	/∅/, /äː/, /ə/, /eː/, /oː/,	ـع	ـعـ	عـ	ع
25	غین	ġain	/ɣ/	ـغ	ـغـ	غـ	غ
26	فے	fē	/f/	ـف	ـفـ	فـ	ف
27	قاف	qāf	/q/	ـق	ـقـ	قـ	ق
28	کاف	kāf	/k/	ـک	ـکـ	کـ	ک
29	گاف	gāf	/ɡ/	ـگ	ـگـ	گـ	گ
30	لام	lām	/l/	ـل	ـلـ	لـ	ل
31	ࣇام	ḷām	/ɭ/	ـࣇ	ـࣇـ	ࣇـ	لؕ
32	میم	mīm	/m/	ـم	ـمـ	مـ	م
33	نون	nūn	/n, ɲ/	ـن	ـنـ	نـ	ن
34	اڑنون	aṛnūn	/ɳ/	ـݨ	ـݨـ	ݨـ	ݨ
35	نون غنّہ	nūn ġunnah	/◌̃, ŋ/	ـں	ـن٘ـ	ن٘ـ	ں
36	واؤ	vāʼo	/ʋ, uː, ʊ, oː, ɔː/	ـو	ـو	و	و
37	نکی ہے گول ہے	nikkī hē gol hē	/ɦ, ɑː, e:/	ـہ	ـہـ	ہـ	ہ
38	دو چشمی ہے	do-cashmī hē	/ʰ/ or /ʱ/	ـھ	ـھـ	ھ	ھ
39	ہمزہ	hamzah	/ʔ/, /∅/	ء	ء	ء	ء
40	چھوٹی يے	choṭī yē	/j, iː/	ـی	ـیـ	یـ	ی
41	وڈّی يے	waḍḍi yē	/ɛː, eː/	ـے	N/A	N/A	ے

No Punjabi words begin with ں, ھ, or ے. Words which begin with ڑ are exceedingly rare, but some have been documented in Shahmukhi dictionaries such as Iqbal Salahuddin's Waddi Punjabi Lughat. The digraphs of aspirated consonants are as follows. In addition, ل and لؕ form ligatures with ا: لا (ـلا) and لؕا (ـلؕا).

==== Aspirates ====
No.	Digraph	Transcription	IPA	Example
1	بھ	bh	[bʱ]	بھاری
2	پھ	ph	[pʰ]	پھل
3	تھ	th	[t̪ʰ]	تھم
4	ٹھ	ṭh	[ʈʰ]	ٹھیس
5	جھ	jh	[d͡ʒʱ]	جھاڑی
6	چھ	ch	[t͡ʃʰ]	چھوکرا
7	دھ	dh	[d̪ʱ]	دھوبی
8	ڈھ	ḍh	[ɖʱ]	ڈھول
9	رھ	rh	[ɾʰ]	بارھویں
10	ڑھ	ṛh	[ɽʰ]	کڑھنا
11	کھ	kh	[kʰ]	کھولنا
12	گھ	gh	[ɡʱ]	گھبراہٹ
13	لھ	lh	[lʰ]	کولھ
14	مھ	mh	[mʰ]	سامھنا
15	نھ	nh	[nʰ]	چنھاں
16	وھ	wh	[ʋʰ]	وھایا
17	یھ	yh	[jʰ]	یھاوا

- ے (waddi ye) is only found in the final position, when writing the sounds e (ਏ) or æ (ਐ), and in initial and medial positions, it takes the form of ی.
- Vowels are expressed as follows:

Final	Middle	Initial
ـہ	ـَ	اَ
یٰ	ـَا	آ
N/A	ـِ	اِ
ـِى	ـِيـ	اِی
ـے	ـيـ	اے
ـَے	ـَيـ	اَے
N/A	ـُ	اُ
ـُو		اُو
ـو		او
ـَو		اَو

=== Difference from Persian and Urdu ===
Shahmukhi has more letters than its Persian base and related Urdu alphabet, to represent the special sounds that are only in Punjabi, which already have additional letters added to the Arabic base itself to represent sounds not present in Arabic. Characters added which differ from Persian but not Urdu include: ٹ to represent /ʈ/, ڈ to represent /ɖ/, ڑ to represent /ɽ/, ں to represent /◌̃/, and ے to represent /ɛ:/ or /e:/. Furthermore, a separate do-cashmi-he letter, ھ, exists to denote a /ʰ/ or a /ʱ/, this letter is mainly used as part of the multitude of digraphs, detailed above. Characters added which differ from Urdu include: لؕ to represent /ɭ/ and ݨ to represent /ɳ/. These characters, however are seldom used.

=== Pronunciation ===
The letter ژ is pronounced 'j' in French or as vision in English and the letter ع is often transliterated in many ways due to its changing sound in various Arabic and Persian words.

== Gallery ==
Modern Shahmukhi alphabet table in Mehr Nastaliq Saraiki font

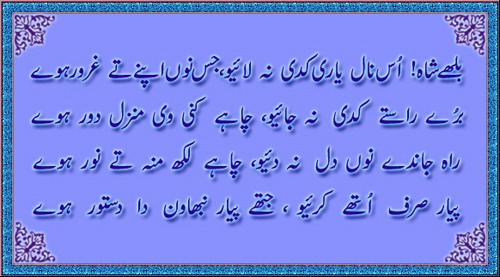
Another example of poetry by Bulleh Shah in Shahmukhi

Punjabi poem by Munir Niazi

Verses on ishq attributed to 17th century poet Bulleh Shah, written in Shahmukhi script

"Shahmukhi" written in Shahmukhi script

== See also ==
- Gurmukhī alphabet
- Saraiki alphabet
