= Voiced retroflex lateral approximant =

Consonantal sound represented by ⟨ɭ⟩ in IPA

ɭ
- IPA number: 156

Audio sample
- source · help

Encoding
- Entity (decimal): &#621;
- Unicode (hex): U+026D
- X-SAMPA: l`
- Braille: ⠲ (braille pattern dots-256) ⠇ (braille pattern dots-123)
Image

Voiced subapical retroflex lateral approximant
This recording illustrates a subapical retroflex articulation, where the tongue tip curls back and the underside of the tip makes contact with the postalveolar region

A voiced retroflex lateral approximant is a type of consonantal sound used in some spoken languages. The symbol in the International Phonetic Alphabet that represents this sound is ⟨ɭ ⟩.

A retroflex lateral approximant contrasts phonemically with its voiceless counterpart /ɭ̊ / in Iaai and Toda. In both of these languages it also contrasts with more anterior /l̥, l/, which are dental in Iaai and alveolar in Toda.

== Features ==
Features of a voiced retroflex lateral approximant:

- Its manner of articulation is approximant, which means it is produced by narrowing the vocal tract at the place of articulation, but not enough to produce a turbulent airstream.
- Its place of articulation is retroflex, which prototypically means it is articulated subapical (with the tip of the tongue curled up), but more generally, it means that it is postalveolar without being palatalized. That is, besides the prototypical subapical articulation, the tongue can be apical (pointed) or, in some fricatives, laminal (flat).
- Its phonation is voiced, which means the vocal cords vibrate during the articulation.
- It is an oral consonant, which means that air is not allowed to escape through the nose.
- It is a lateral consonant, which means it is produced by directing the airstream over the sides of the tongue, rather than down the middle.
- Its airstream mechanism is pulmonic, which means it is articulated by pushing air only with the intercostal muscles and abdominal muscles, as in most speech sounds.

== Occurrence ==
In the following transcriptions, diacritics may be used to distinguish between apical [ɭ̺] and laminal [ɭ̻].

Language		Word	IPA	Meaning	Notes
Bashkir		ел	[jɪ̞ɭ]	'wind'	Apical retroflex lateral; occurs in front vowel contexts.
Dhivehi		ފަޅޯ / falhoa	[faɭoː]	'papaya'	Represented by the Thaana letter ޅ (lhaviyani).
Enindhilyagwa		marluwiya	[maɭuwija]	'emu'	
Faroese		árla	[ɔɻɭa]	'early'	Allophone of /l/ after /ɹ/. See Faroese phonology
French	Standard	belle jambe	[bɛɭ ʒɑ̃b]	'beautiful leg'	Allophone of /l/ before /f/ and /ʒ/ for some speakers. See French phonology
Gujarati		નળ	[nəɭə]	'tap'	Represented by a ⟨ળ⟩. Pronounced as /ɭə/.
Kannada		ಎಳ್ಳು	[ˈeɭːu]	'sesame'	Represented by a ⟨ಳ⟩
Katukina-Kanamari			[ɭuːˈbɯ]	'to go'	
Khanty	Eastern dialects	пуӆ	[puɭ]	'bit'	
Khanty	Some northern dialects	пуӆ	[puɭ]	'bit'	
Korean		솔 / sol	[soɭ]	'pine'	Represented by a ⟨ㄹ⟩. May also be pronounced as /l/.
Malayalam	Malayalam script	മലയാളം	[mɐlɐjäːɭɐm]	'Malayalam'	Represented by the letter ⟨ള⟩. Sub apical retroflex. Long and short forms are contrastive word-medially
Malayalam	Arabi Malayalam (Mapilla)	مَلَیٰاۻَمْ	[mɐlɐjäːɭɐm]	'Malayalam'	
Mapudungun		mara	[ˈmɜɭɜ]	'hare'	Possible realization of /ʐ/; may be [ʐ] or [ɻ] instead.
Marathi		बाळ	[baːɭ]	'baby/child'	Represented by a ⟨ळ⟩. Pronounced as /ɭə/. See Marathi phonology.
Miyako	Irabu dialect	昼間 ピィルマ	[pɭːma]	'daytime'	Allophone of /ɾ/ used everywhere except syllable-initially.
Norwegian	Eastern and central dialects	farlig	[ˈfɑːɭi]	'dangerous'	See Norwegian phonology
Odia		ଫଳ	[pʰɔɭɔ]	'fruit'	Represented by a ⟨ଳ⟩. Pronounced as /ɭɔ/.
Parkari Koli		واۮۯون	[vaːɗaɭuːn]	'clouds'	
Rajasthani		फळ	[pʰəɭ]	'fruit'	Represented by a ⟨ळ⟩.
Paiwan		ladjap	[ˈɭaɖap]	'lightning' or 'flash'	See Paiwan phonology
Punjabi	Gurmukhi	ਤ੍ਰੇਲ਼	[t̪ɾeɭ]	'dew'	Represented by a ⟨ਲ਼⟩ and ⟨لؕ⟩. Font support may be required to see the letter in Shahmukhi.
Punjabi	Shahmukhi	تریلؕ	[t̪ɾeɭ]	'dew'	Represented by a ⟨ਲ਼⟩ and ⟨لؕ⟩. Font support may be required to see the letter in Shahmukhi.
Swedish		sorl	[soːɭ]	'murmur' (noun)	See Swedish phonology
Tamil		ஆள் / اٰۻْ	[äːɭ]	'person'	Represented by a ⟨ள்⟩. See Tamil phonology
Telugu		నీళ్	[niːɭ]	'water'	Represented by a ⟨ళ⟩
Wu Chinese	Northern Wu (Linping variety)	而/er^{2}	[eɭ˩˧]	'conjunction (literary)'	A rhotic consonant (cf. Changzhounese /ɦər˨˩˧/)

== See also ==
- Index of phonetics articles

== Notes ==
Place →	Labial					Coronal										Dorsal					Laryngeal			
Manner ↓	Bilabial		Labiodental		Linguolabial		Dental		Alveolar		Postalveolar		Retroflex		(Alveolo-)palatal		Velar		Uvular		Pharyngeal/epiglottal		Glottal	
Nasal	m̥	m	ɱ̊	ɱ		n̼	n̪̊	n̪	n̥	n	n̠̊	n̠	ɳ̊	ɳ	ɲ̊	ɲ	ŋ̊	ŋ	ɴ̥	ɴ				
Plosive	p	b	p̪	b̪	t̼	d̼	t̪	d̪	t	d			ʈ	ɖ	c	ɟ	k	ɡ	q	ɢ	ʡ		ʔ	
Sibilant affricate							t̪s̪	d̪z̪	ts	dz	t̠ʃ	d̠ʒ	tʂ	dʐ	tɕ	dʑ								
Non-sibilant affricate	pɸ	bβ	p̪f	b̪v			t̪θ	d̪ð	tɹ̝̊	dɹ̝	t̠ɹ̠̊˔	d̠ɹ̠˔			cç	ɟʝ	kx	ɡɣ	qχ	ɢʁ	ʡʜ	ʡʢ	ʔh	
Sibilant fricative							s̪	z̪	s	z	ʃ	ʒ	ʂ	ʐ	ɕ	ʑ								
Non-sibilant fricative	ɸ	β	f	v	θ̼	ð̼	θ	ð	θ̠	ð̠	ɹ̠̊˔	ɹ̠˔	ɻ̊˔	ɻ˔	ç	ʝ	x	ɣ	χ	ʁ	ħ	ʕ	h	ɦ
Approximant		β̞		ʋ				ð̞		ɹ		ɹ̠		ɻ		j		ɰ						˷
Tap/flap		ⱱ̟		ⱱ					ɾ̥	ɾ			ɽ̊	ɽ						ɢ̆		ʡ̆		
Trill	ʙ̥	ʙ							r̥	r		r̠	ɽ̊r̥	ɽr					ʀ̥	ʀ	ʜ	ʢ		
Lateral affricate									tɬ	dɮ			tꞎ	d𝼅	c𝼆	ɟʎ̝	k𝼄	ɡʟ̝						
Lateral fricative							ɬ̪		ɬ	ɮ			ꞎ	𝼅	𝼆	ʎ̝	𝼄	ʟ̝						
Lateral approximant								l̪	l̥	l		l̠	ɭ̊	ɭ	ʎ̥	ʎ	ʟ̥	ʟ		ʟ̠				
Lateral tap/flap									ɺ̥	ɺ			𝼈̊	𝼈		ʎ̆		ʟ̆						

		BL	LD	D	A	PA	RF	P	V	U
Implosive	Voiced	ɓ			ɗ		ᶑ	ʄ	ɠ	ʛ
Implosive	Voiceless	ɓ̥			ɗ̥		ᶑ̊	ʄ̊	ɠ̊	ʛ̥
Ejective	Stop	pʼ			tʼ		ʈʼ	cʼ	kʼ	qʼ
Ejective	Affricate		p̪fʼ	tθʼ	tsʼ	tʃʼ	tʂʼ	tɕʼ	kxʼ	qχʼ
Ejective	Fricative	ɸʼ	fʼ	θʼ	sʼ	ʃʼ	ʂʼ	ɕʼ	xʼ	χʼ
Ejective	Lateral affricate				tɬʼ			c𝼆ʼ	k𝼄ʼ	q𝼄ʼ
Ejective	Lateral fricative				ɬʼ					
Click (top: velar; bottom: uvular)	Tenuis	kʘ qʘ		kǀ qǀ	kǃ qǃ		k𝼊 q𝼊	kǂ qǂ		
Click (top: velar; bottom: uvular)	Voiced	ɡʘ ɢʘ		ɡǀ ɢǀ	ɡǃ ɢǃ		ɡ𝼊 ɢ𝼊	ɡǂ ɢǂ		
Click (top: velar; bottom: uvular)	Nasal	ŋʘ ɴʘ		ŋǀ ɴǀ	ŋǃ ɴǃ		ŋ𝼊 ɴ𝼊	ŋǂ ɴǂ	ʞ	
Click (top: velar; bottom: uvular)	Tenuis lateral				kǁ qǁ					
Click (top: velar; bottom: uvular)	Voiced lateral				ɡǁ ɢǁ					
Click (top: velar; bottom: uvular)	Nasal lateral				ŋǁ ɴǁ					
