= Nūn ġuṇnā =

Additional letter of the Arabic script

Nūn ġunnā, (Urdu: نُون غُنَّہ; Unicode: U+06BA ں ARABIC LETTER NOON GHUNNA) is an additional letter of the Arabic script not used in the Arabic alphabet itself but used in Urdu, Saraiki, and Shahmukhi Punjabi to represent a nasal vowel, [◌̃]. In Shahmukhi, it is represented by the diacritic ٘◌. It is a nasal vowel used in many Indo-Aryan languages and Iranian languages. It is represented by the International Phonetic Alphabet by the sound of ⟨◌̃⟩. It is a dotless noon. In Saraiki and Balti, nūn ġunnā is sometimes written as ن٘.

== Forms ==
Position in word:	Isolated	Final	Medial	Initial
Glyph form: (Help)	ں	ـں	ـںـ	ںـ

Position in word:	Isolated	Final	Medial	Initial
Glyph form: (Help)	ن٘	ـن٘	ـن٘ـ	ن٘ـ

== Languages ==
The following languages use nūn ġunnā:

1. Urdu
2. Punjabi
3. Kashmiri
4. Pashto
5. Balochi
6. Khowar
7. Brahui
8. Torwali
9. Palula
10. Burushaski
11. Kalkoti
12. Shina
13. Indus Kohistani
14. Ormuri
15. Marwari
16. Hindko
17. Pahari-Pothwari
18. Dogri
19. Wanetsi
20. Gawar-Bati
21. Kurdish
22. Shekhani
23. Kalami
24. Gujari
25. Dameli
26. Ushojo

== See also ==
- ݨ
- ڑ
- ن
- ٹ
- ھ
- ڻ
