= B̤ē =

Letter of the Arabic script

B̤ē (ٻ) is an additional letter of the Arabic script, derived from bāʼ (ب) with an additional dot. It is not used in the Arabic alphabet itself, but is used to represent the sound [ɓ] when writing Sindhi, Saraiki, and Hausa in the Arabic script. The same sound may also be written simply as bāʾ in Hausa, undifferentiated from [b].

| Position in word: | Isolated | Final | Medial | Initial |
|---|---|---|---|---|
| Glyph form: (Help) | ٻ | ـٻ | ـٻـ | ٻـ |

Both Hausa and Sindhi are also written in scripts besides Arabic. The sound represented by b̤ē is written Ɓ ɓ in Hausa's Latin orthography, and written ॿ in Sindhi and Saraiki's Devanagari orthography.

== See also ==
- ڄ
- ݙ
- ڳ
- ݨ
