= ڄ =

Arabic letter

ڄ, Arabic letter cyeh (U+0684), is an additional letter of the Arabic script, not used in the Arabic alphabet itself but used in Sindhi and Saraiki to represent a voiced palatal implosive, [ʄ]. For ڄ example is used in ڄموں، cemuñ ڄلم۔ celam It is written as ॼ C in Saraiki and Sindhi's Devanagari orthography.

== Compound ڄ / Cyeh ==
When 'ن'& 'ڄ' are mixed and 'نڄ' cyen is formed Palatal nasal, [ɲ]. Some people used in last century Arabic letter xacyeh ڃ (U+0683) for this compound. But now only نڄ necy is used. For example, ecy is used in ونڄ، wanec تھنڄ۔ tehinc

== Forms ==
The Arabic letter Cyeh, or ڄ, has 4 forms in total. They are:

Position in word:	Isolated	Final	Medial	Initial
Glyph form: (Help)	ڄ cy	ـڄ cy	ـڄ cyـ	ڄ cyـ

== See also ==
- ٻ byeh
- ݙ dyaeh
- ڳ gyeh
- ݨ nyanteh
