= Ḍa =

Letter "Ḍa" in Indic scripts

Example glyphs
- Bengali–Assamese: Ḍa
- Tibetan: ཌ
- Thai: ฑ
- Malayalam: ഡ
- Sinhala: ඩ
- Ashoka Brahmi: Ḍa
- Devanagari: Ḍa

Cognates
- Hebrew: ד
- Greek: Δ
- Latin: D
- Cyrillic: Д

Properties
- Phonemic representation: /ɖ/ /ɗ/^{B} /d/^{C} /tʰ/^{D}
- IAST transliteration: ḍ Ḍ
- ISCII code point: BF (191)
- ^B in Khmer and Mon^C in Burmese, Northern Thai, Tai Lü, Tai Khün, Lao^D in Thai

Ḍa (also romanized as Dda) is a consonant of Indic abugidas. In modern Indic scripts, Ḍa is derived from the early "Ashoka" Brahmi letter after having gone through the Gupta letter. As with the other cerebral consonants, ḍa is not found in most scripts for Tai, Sino-Tibetan, and other non-Indic languages, except for a few scripts, which retain these letters for transcribing Sanskrit religious terms.

== Āryabhaṭa numeration ==
Aryabhata used Devanagari letters for numbers, very similar to the Greek numerals, even after the invention of Indian numerals. The values of the different forms of ड are:

- ड [ɖə] = 13 (१३)
- डि [ɖɪ] = 1,300 (१ ३००)
- डु [ɖʊ] = 130,000 (१ ३० ०००)
- डृ [ɖri] = 13,000,000 (१ ३० ०० ०००)
- डॢ [ɖlə] = 1,300,000,000 (१ ३० ०० ०० ०००)
- डे [ɖe] = 13×10^{10} (१३×१०^{१०})
- डै [ɖɛː] = 13×10^{12} (१३×१०^{१२})
- डो [ɖoː] = 13×10^{14} (१३×१०^{१४})
- डौ [ɖɔː] = 13×10^{16} (१३×१०^{१६})

== Historic Ḍa ==
There are three different general early historic scripts - Brahmi and its variants, Kharoṣṭhī, and Tocharian, the so-called slanting Brahmi. Ḍa as found in standard Brahmi, was a simple geometric shape, with variations toward more flowing forms by the Gupta. The Tocharian Ḍa did not have an alternate Fremdzeichen form. The third form of ḍa, in Kharoshthi was probably derived from Aramaic separately from the Brahmi letter.

=== Brahmi Ḍa ===
The Brahmi letter, Ḍa, is probably derived from the altered Aramaic Dalet, and is thus related to the modern Latin D and Greek Delta. Several identifiable styles of writing the Brahmi Ḍa can be found, most associated with a specific set of inscriptions from an artifact or diverse records from an historic period. As the earliest and most geometric style of Brahmi, the letters found on the Edicts of Ashoka and other records from around that time are normally the reference form for Brahmi letters, with vowel marks not attested until later forms of Brahmi back-formed to match the geometric writing style.

Brahmi Ḍa historic forms
Ashoka (3rd-1st c. BCE)	Girnar (~150 BCE)	Kushana (~150-250 CE)	Gujarat (~250 CE)	Gupta (~350 CE)

=== Tocharian Ḍa ===
The Tocharian letter is derived from the Brahmi, but does not have an alternate Fremdzeichen form.

Tocharian Ḍa with vowel marks
Ḍa	Ḍā	Ḍi	Ḍī	Ḍu	Ḍū	Ḍr	Ḍr̄	Ḍe	Ḍai	Ḍo	Ḍau	Ḍä

=== Kharoṣṭhī Ḍa ===
The Kharoṣṭhī letter is generally accepted as being derived from the altered Aramaic Dalet, and is thus related to D and Delta, in addition to the Brahmi Ḍa.

== Devanagari Ḍa ==
Ḍa (ड) is a consonant of the Devanagari abugida. It ultimately arose from the Brahmi letter, after having gone through the Gupta letter. Letters that derive from it are the Gujarati letter ડ, and the Modi letter 𑘚.

=== Devanagari-using Languages ===
In all languages, ड is pronounced as [ɖə] or [ɖ] when appropriate. Like all Indic scripts, Devanagari uses vowel marks attached to the base consonant to override the inherent /ə/ vowel:

Devanagari ड with vowel marks
Ḍa	Ḍā	Ḍi	Ḍī	Ḍu	Ḍū	Ḍr	Ḍr̄	Ḍl	Ḍl̄	Ḍe	Ḍai	Ḍo	Ḍau	Ḍ
ड	डा	डि	डी	डु	डू	डृ	डॄ	डॢ	डॣ	डे	डै	डो	डौ	ड्

=== Conjuncts with ड ===
Devanagari exhibits conjunct ligatures, as is common in Indic scripts. In modern Devanagari texts, most conjuncts are formed by reducing the letter shape to fit tightly to the following letter, usually by dropping a character's vertical stem, sometimes referred to as a "half form". Some conjunct clusters are always represented by a true ligature, instead of a shape that can be broken into constituent independent letters. Vertically stacked conjuncts are ubiquitous in older texts, while only a few are still used routinely in modern Devanagari texts. Lacking a vertical stem to drop for making a half form, Ḍa either forms a stacked conjunct/ligature, or uses its full form with Virama. The use of ligatures and vertical conjuncts may vary across languages using the Devanagari script, with Marathi in particular avoiding their use where other languages would use them.

==== Ligature conjuncts of ड ====
True ligatures are quite rare in Indic scripts. The most common ligated conjuncts in Devanagari are in the form of a slight mutation to fit in context or as a consistent variant form appended to the adjacent characters. Those variants include Na and the Repha and Rakar forms of Ra. Nepali and Marathi texts use the "eyelash" Ra half form for an initial "R" instead of repha.

- Repha र্ (r) + ड (ḍa) gives the ligature rḍa: ^{note}

- Eyelash र্ (r) + ड (ḍa) gives the ligature rḍa:

- ड্ (ḍ) + rakar र (ra) gives the ligature ḍra:

- ड্ (ḍ) + य (ya) gives the ligature ḍya:

==== Stacked conjuncts of ड ====
Vertically stacked ligatures are the most common conjunct forms found in Devanagari text. Although the constituent characters may need to be stretched and moved slightly in order to stack neatly, stacked conjuncts can be broken down into recognizable base letters, or a letter and an otherwise standard ligature.

- ब্ (b) + ड (ḍa) gives the ligature bḍa:

- भ্ (bʰ) + ड (ḍa) gives the ligature bʰḍa:

- च্ (c) + ड (ḍa) gives the ligature cḍa:

- छ্ (cʰ) + ड (ḍa) gives the ligature cʰḍa:

- ड্ (ḍ) + ब (ba) gives the ligature ḍba:

- ड্ (ḍ) + भ (bʰa) gives the ligature ḍbʰa:

- ड্ (ḍ) + च (ca) gives the ligature ḍca:

- ड্ (ḍ) + छ (cʰa) gives the ligature ḍcʰa:

- ड্ (ḍ) + द (da) gives the ligature ḍda:

- द্ (d) + ड (ḍa) gives the ligature dḍa:

- ड্ (ḍ) + ड (ḍa) gives the ligature ḍḍa:

- ड্ (ḍ) + ढ (ḍʱa) gives the ligature ḍḍʱa:

- ड্ (ḍ) + ध (dʱa) gives the ligature ḍdʱa:

- ड্ (ḍ) + ग (ga) gives the ligature ḍga:

- ड্ (ḍ) + घ (ɡʱa) gives the ligature ḍɡʱa:

- ड্ (ḍ) + ह (ha) gives the ligature ḍha:

- ढ্ (ḍʱ) + ड (ḍa) gives the ligature ḍʱḍa:

- ड্ (ḍ) + ज (ja) gives the ligature ḍja:

- ड্ (ḍ) + झ (jʰa) gives the ligature ḍjʰa:

- ड্ (ḍ) + ज্ (j) + ञ (ña) gives the ligature ḍjña:

- ड্ (ḍ) + क (ka) gives the ligature ḍka:

- ड্ (ḍ) + ख (kʰa) gives the ligature ḍkʰa:

- ड্ (ḍ) + क্ (k) + ष (ṣa) gives the ligature ḍkṣa:

- ड্ (ḍ) + ल (la) gives the ligature ḍla:

- ड্ (ḍ) + ळ (ḷa) gives the ligature ḍḷa:

- ड্ (ḍ) + म (ma) gives the ligature ḍma:

- ड্ (ḍ) + न (na) gives the ligature ḍna:

- ड্ (ḍ) + ङ (ŋa) gives the ligature ḍŋa:

- ड্ (ḍ) + ण (ṇa) gives the ligature ḍṇa:

- ड্ (ḍ) + ञ (ña) gives the ligature ḍña:

- ड্ (ḍ) + प (pa) gives the ligature ḍpa:

- ड্ (ḍ) + फ (pʰa) gives the ligature ḍpʰa:

- ड্ (ḍ) + स (sa) gives the ligature ḍsa:

- ड্ (ḍ) + श (ʃa) gives the ligature ḍʃa:

- ड্ (ḍ) + ष (ṣa) gives the ligature ḍṣa:

- ड্ (ḍ) + त (ta) gives the ligature ḍta:

- ड্ (ḍ) + थ (tʰa) gives the ligature ḍtʰa:

- ड্ (ḍ) + ट (ṭa) gives the ligature ḍṭa:

- ड্ (ḍ) + ठ (ṭʰa) gives the ligature ḍṭʰa:

- ड্ (ḍ) + व (va) gives the ligature ḍva:

- ध্ (dʱ) + ड (ḍa) gives the ligature dʱḍa:

- घ্ (ɡʱ) + ड (ḍa) gives the ligature ɡʱḍa:

- ज্ (j) + ड (ḍa) gives the ligature jḍa:

- झ্ (jʰ) + ड (ḍa) gives the ligature jʰḍa:

- क্ (k) + ड (ḍa) gives the ligature kḍa:

- ख্ (kʰ) + ड (ḍa) gives the ligature kʰḍa:

- ळ্ (ḷ) + ड (ḍa) gives the ligature ḷḍa:

- म্ (m) + ड (ḍa) gives the ligature mḍa:

- ङ্ (ŋ) + ड (ḍa) gives the ligature ŋḍa:

- प্ (p) + ड (ḍa) gives the ligature pḍa:

- फ্ (pʰ) + ड (ḍa) gives the ligature pʰḍa:

- ष্ (ṣ) + ड (ḍa) gives the ligature ṣḍa:

- थ্ (tʰ) + ड (ḍa) gives the ligature tʰḍa:

- ट্ (ṭ) + ड (ḍa) gives the ligature ṭḍa:

- ठ্ (ṭʰ) + ड (ḍa) gives the ligature ṭʰḍa:

- व্ (v) + ड (ḍa) gives the ligature vḍa:

- य্ (y) + ड (ḍa) gives the ligature yḍa:

== Bengali Ḍa ==
The Bengali script ড is derived from the Siddhaṃ, and is marked by a similar horizontal head line, but less geometric shape, than its Devanagari counterpart, ड. The inherent vowel of Bengali consonant letters is /ɔ/, so the bare letter ড will sometimes be transliterated as "ḍo" instead of "ḍa". Adding okar, the "o" vowel mark, gives a reading of /d̳o/. Like all Indic consonants, ড can be modified by marks to indicate another (or no) vowel than its inherent "a".

Bengali ড with vowel marks
ḍa	ḍā	ḍi	ḍī	ḍu	ḍū	ḍr	ḍr̄	ḍe	ḍai	ḍo	ḍau	ḍ
ড	ডা	ডি	ডী	ডু	ডূ	ডৃ	ডৄ	ডে	ডৈ	ডো	ডৌ	ড্

=== ড in Bengali-using languages ===
ড is used as a basic consonant character in all of the major Bengali script orthographies, including Bengali and Assamese.

=== Conjuncts with ড ===
Bengali ড exhibits conjunct ligatures, as is common in Indic scripts, with a tendency towards stacked ligatures.

- ড্ (ḍ) + ড (ḍa) gives the ligature ḍḍa:

- ড্ (ḍ) + র (ra) gives the ligature ḍra, with the ra phala suffix:

- ড্ (ḍ) + ব (va) gives the ligature ḍva, with the va phala suffix:

- ড্ (ḍ) + য (ya) gives the ligature ḍya, with the ya phala suffix:

- ল্ (l) + ড (ḍa) gives the ligature lḍa:

- ন্ (n) + ড (ḍa) gives the ligature nḍa:

- ন্ (n) + ড্ (ḍ) + র (ra) gives the ligature nḍra, with the ra phala suffix:

- ণ্ (ṇ) + ড (ḍa) gives the ligature ṇḍa:

- ণ্ (ṇ) + ড্ (ḍ) + র (ra) gives the ligature ṇḍra, with the ra phala suffix:

- ণ্ (ṇ) + ড্ (ḍ) + য (ya) gives the ligature ṇḍya, with the ya phala suffix:

- র্ (r) + ড (ḍa) gives the ligature rḍa, with the repha prefix:

== Gujarati Ḍa ==
Gujarati Ḍa.

Ḍa (ડ) is the thirteenth consonant of the Gujarati abugida. It is derived from the Devanagari Ḍa with the top bar (shiro rekha) removed, and ultimately the Brahmi letter.

=== Gujarati-using Languages ===
The Gujarati script is used to write the Gujarati and Kutchi languages. In both languages, ડ is pronounced as [ɖə] or [ɖ] when appropriate. Like all Indic scripts, Gujarati uses vowel marks attached to the base consonant to override the inherent /ə/ vowel:

Ḍa	Ḍā	Ḍi	Ḍī	Ḍu	Ḍū	Ḍr	Ḍl	Ḍr̄	Ḍl̄	Ḍĕ	Ḍe	Ḍai	Ḍŏ	Ḍo	Ḍau	Ḍ
Gujarati Ḍa syllables, with vowel marks in red.

=== Conjuncts with ડ ===
Gujarati ડ exhibits conjunct ligatures, much like its parent Devanagari Script. While most Gujarati conjuncts can only be formed by reducing the letter shape to create a "half form" that fits tightly to following letter, Ḍa does not have a half form. A few conjunct clusters can be represented by a true ligature, instead of a shape that can be broken into constituent independent letters, and vertically stacked conjuncts can also be found in Gujarati, although much less commonly than in Devanagari. Lacking a half form, Ḍa will normally use an explicit virama when forming conjuncts without a true ligature. True ligatures are quite rare in Indic scripts. The most common ligated conjuncts in Gujarati are in the form of a slight mutation to fit in context or as a consistent variant form appended to the adjacent characters. Those variants include Na and the Repha and Rakar forms of Ra.

- ર્ (r) + ડ (ɖa) gives the ligature RḌa:

- ડ્ (ɖ) + ર (ra) gives the ligature ḌRa:

- ડ્ (ɖ) + ડ (ɖa) gives the ligature ḌḌa:

- ડ્ (ɖ) + ન (na) gives the ligature ḌNa:

- ડ્ (ɖ) + વ (va) gives the ligature ḌVa:

== Telugu Ḍa ==
Telugu independent and subjoined Ḍa.

Ḍa (డ) is a consonant of the Telugu abugida. It ultimately arose from the Brahmi letter. It is closely related to the Kannada letter ಡ. Most Telugu consonants contain a v-shaped headstroke that is related to the horizontal headline found in other Indic scripts, although headstrokes do not connect adjacent letters in Telugu. The headstroke is normally lost when adding vowel matras. Telugu conjuncts are created by reducing trailing letters to a subjoined form that appears below the initial consonant of the conjunct. Many subjoined forms are created by dropping their headline, with many extending the end of the stroke of the main letter body to form an extended tail reaching up to the right of the preceding consonant. This subjoining of trailing letters to create conjuncts is in contrast to the leading half forms of Devanagari and Bengali letters. Ligature conjuncts are not a feature in Telugu, with the only non-standard construction being an alternate subjoined form of Ṣa (borrowed from Kannada) in the KṢa conjunct.

== Malayalam Ḍa ==
Malayalam letter Ḍa

Ḍa (ഡ) is a consonant of the Malayalam abugida. It ultimately arose from the Brahmi letter, via the Grantha letter Ḍa. Like in other Indic scripts, Malayalam consonants have the inherent vowel "a", and take one of several modifying vowel signs to represent syllables with another vowel or no vowel at all.

Malayalam Ḍa matras: Ḍa, Ḍā, Ḍi, Ḍī, Ḍu, Ḍū, Ḍr̥, Ḍr̥̄, Ḍl̥, Ḍl̥̄, Ḍe, Ḍē, Ḍai, Ḍo, Ḍō, Ḍau, and Ḍ.

=== Conjuncts of ഡ ===
As is common in Indic scripts, Malayalam joins letters together to form conjunct consonant clusters. There are several ways in which conjuncts are formed in Malayalam texts: using a post-base form of a trailing consonant placed under the initial consonant of a conjunct, a combined ligature of two or more consonants joined together, a conjoining form that appears as a combining mark on the rest of the conjunct, the use of an explicit candrakkala mark to suppress the inherent "a" vowel, or a special consonant form called a "chillu" letter, representing a bare consonant without the inherent "a" vowel. Texts written with the modern reformed Malayalam orthography, put̪iya lipi, may favor more regular conjunct forms than older texts in paḻaya lipi, due to changes undertaken in the 1970s by the Government of Kerala.

- ഡ് (ḍ) + ഡ (ḍa) gives the ligature ḍḍa:

- ണ് (ṇ) + ഡ (ḍa) gives the ligature ṇḍa:

- ഡ് (ḍ) + ഢ (ḍʱa) gives the ligature ḍḍʱa:

== Odia Ḍa ==
Odia independent and subjoined letter Ḍa.

Ḍa (ଡ) is a consonant of the Odia abugida. It ultimately arose from the Brahmi letter, via the Siddhaṃ letter Ḍa. Like in other Indic scripts, Odia consonants have the inherent vowel "a", and take one of several modifying vowel signs to represent syllables with another vowel or no vowel at all.

Odia Ḍa with vowel matras
Ḍa	Ḍā	Ḍi	Ḍī	Ḍu	Ḍū	Ḍr̥	Ḍr̥̄	Ḍl̥	Ḍl̥̄	Ḍe	Ḍai	Ḍo	Ḍau	Ḍ
ଡ	ଡା	ଡି	ଡୀ	ଡୁ	ଡୂ	ଡୃ	ଡୄ	ଡୢ	ଡୣ	ଡେ	ଡୈ	ଡୋ	ଡୌ	ଡ୍

=== Conjuncts of ଡ ===
As is common in Indic scripts, Odia joins letters together to form conjunct consonant clusters. The most common conjunct formation is achieved by using a small subjoined form of trailing consonants. Most consonants' subjoined forms are identical to the full form, just reduced in size, although a few drop the curved headline or have a subjoined form not directly related to the full form of the consonant. The second type of conjunct formation is through pure ligatures, where the constituent consonants are written together in a single graphic form. This ligature may be recognizable as being a combination of two characters or it can have a conjunct ligature unrelated to its constituent characters.

- ଣ୍ (ṇ) + ଡ (ḍa) gives the ligature ṇḍa:

== Kaithi Ḍa ==
Kaithi consonant Ḍa.

Ḍa (𑂙) is a consonant of the Kaithi abugida. It ultimately arose from the Brahmi letter, via the Siddhaṃ letter Ḍa. Like in other Indic scripts, Kaithi consonants have the inherent vowel "a", and take one of several modifying vowel signs to represent syllables with another vowel or no vowel at all.

Kaithi Ḍa with vowel matras
Ḍa	Ḍā	Ḍi	Ḍī	Ḍu	Ḍū	Ḍe	Ḍai	Ḍo	Ḍau	Ḍ
𑂙	𑂙𑂰	𑂙𑂱	𑂙𑂲	𑂙𑂳	𑂙𑂴	𑂙𑂵	𑂙𑂶	𑂙𑂷	𑂙𑂸	𑂙𑂹

=== Conjuncts of 𑂙 ===
As is common in Indic scripts, Kaithi joins letters together to form conjunct consonant clusters. The most common conjunct formation is achieved by using a half form of preceding consonants, although several consonants use an explicit virama. Most half forms are derived from the full form by removing the vertical stem. As is common in most Indic scripts, conjuncts of ra are indicated with a repha or rakar mark attached to the rest of the consonant cluster. In addition, there are a few vertical conjuncts that can be found in Kaithi writing, but true ligatures are not used in the modern Kaithi script.

- 𑂩୍ (r) + 𑂙 (ḍa) gives the ligature rḍa:

=== Kaithi Ṛa ===
Kaithi consonant Ṛa.

Ṛa (𑂚) is a consonant of the Kaithi abugida derived from 𑂙 Ḍa. Ṛa acts

Kaithi Ṛa with vowel matras
Ṛa	Ṛā	Ṛi	Ṛī	Ṛu	Ṛū	Ṛe	Ṛai	Ṛo	Ṛau	Ṛ
𑂚	𑂚𑂰	𑂚𑂱	𑂚𑂲	𑂚𑂳	𑂚𑂴	𑂚𑂵	𑂚𑂶	𑂚𑂷	𑂚𑂸	𑂚𑂹

==== Conjuncts of 𑂚 ====
As is common in Indic scripts, Kaithi joins letters together to form conjunct consonant clusters. The most common conjunct formation is achieved by using a half form of preceding consonants, although several consonants use an explicit virama. Most half forms are derived from the full form by removing the vertical stem. As is common in most Indic scripts, conjuncts of ra are indicated with a repha or rakar mark attached to the rest of the consonant cluster. In addition, there are a few vertical conjuncts that can be found in Kaithi writing, but true ligatures are not used in the modern Kaithi script.

- 𑂩୍ (r) + 𑂚 (ṛa) gives the ligature rṛa:

== Tirhuta Ḍa ==
Tirhuta consonant Ḍa

Ḍa (𑒛) is a consonant of the Tirhuta abugida. It ultimately arose from the Brahmi letter, via the Siddhaṃ letter Dda. Like in other Indic scripts, Tirhuta consonants have the inherent vowel "a", and take one of several modifying vowel signs to represent sylables with another vowel or no vowel at all.

Tirhuta Ḍa with vowel matras
Ḍa	Ḍā	Ḍi	Ḍī	Ḍu	Ḍū	Ḍṛ	Ḍṝ	Ḍḷ	Ḍḹ	Ḍē	Ḍe	Ḍai	Ḍō	Ḍo	Ḍau	Ḍ
𑒛	𑒛𑒰	𑒛𑒱	𑒛𑒲	𑒛𑒳	𑒛𑒴	𑒛𑒵	𑒛𑒶	𑒛𑒷	𑒛𑒸	𑒛𑒹	𑒛𑒺	𑒛𑒻	𑒛𑒼	𑒛𑒽	𑒛𑒾	𑒛𑓂

=== Conjuncts of 𑒛 ===
As is common in Indic scripts, Tirhuta joins letters together to form conjunct consonant clusters. The most common conjunct formation is achieved by using an explicit virama. As is common in most Indic scripts, conjuncts of ra are indicated with a repha or rakar mark attached to the rest of the consonant cluster. In addition, other consonants take unique combining forms when in conjunct with other letters, and there are several vertical conjuncts and true ligatures that can be found in Tirhuta writing.

- 𑒛୍ (ḍ) + 𑒩 (ra) gives the ligature ḍra:

- 𑒛୍ (ḍ) + 𑒫 (va) gives the ligature ḍva:

- 𑒝୍ (ṇ) + 𑒛 (ḍa) gives the ligature ṇḍa:

- 𑒩୍ (r) + 𑒛 (ḍa) gives the ligature rḍa:

- 𑒞୍ (t) + 𑒛 (ḍa) gives the ligature tḍa:

== Comparison of Ḍa ==
The various Indic scripts are generally related to each other through adaptation and borrowing, and as such the glyphs for cognate letters, including Ḍa, are related as well.

Comparison of Ḍa in different scripts

Aramaic
Kharoṣṭhī 𐨜	Ashoka Brahmi	Kushana Brahmi (Note: The middle "Kushana" form of Brahmi is a later style that emerged as Brahmi scripts were beginning to proliferate. Gupta Brahmi was definitely a stylistic descendant from Kushana, but other Brahmi-derived scripts may have descended from earlier forms.)	Tocharian (Note: Tocharian is probably derived from the middle period "Kushana" form of Brahmi, although artifacts from that time are not plentiful enough to establish a definite succession.)
Gupta Brahmi	Pallava
Kadamba -
Bhaiksuki 𑰚	Siddhaṃ	Grantha 𑌡	Cham ꨙ
Sinhala ඩ	Pyu / Old Mon (Note: Pyu and Old Mon are probably the precursors of the Burmese script, and may be derived from either the Pallava or Kadamba script) -
Tibetan ཌ	Newa 𑐜	Ahom -	Malayalam ഡ
Telugu డ	Burmese ဍ
Lepcha -	Ranjana	Saurashtra ꢞ	Dives Akuru 𑤘
Kannada ಡ	Kayah Li -
Limbu -	Soyombo (Note: May also be derived from Devangari (see bottom left of table)) 𑩨	Khmer ឌ	Tamil -
Chakma 𑄓	Tai Tham ᨯ
Meitei Mayek -	Gaudi -	Thai ฑ	Lao ຑ
Tai Le -
Marchen -	Tirhuta 𑒛	New Tai Lue ᦡ	Tai Viet -	Aksara Kawi
'Phags-pa ꡫ	Odia ଡ	Sharada 𑆝	Rejang -	Batak -	Buginese -
Zanabazar Square 𑨖	Bengali–Assamese	Takri 𑚖	Javanese ꦝ	Balinese ᬟ	Makasar -
Hangul (Note: The Origin of Hangul from 'Phags-pa is one of limited influence, inspiring at most a few basic letter shapes. Hangul does not function as an Indic abugida.) -	Northern Nagari -	Dogri 𑠖	Laṇḍā -	Sundanese -	Baybayin -
Modi 𑘚	Gujarati ડ	Khojki 𑈖	Khudabadi 𑋈	Mahajani 𑅠	Tagbanwa -
Devanagari	Nandinagari 𑦺	Kaithi	Gurmukhi ਡ	Multani 𑊒	Buhid -
Canadian Syllabics (Note: Although the basic letter forms of the Canadian Aboriginal Syllabics were derived from handwritten Devanagari letters, this abugida indicates vowel sounds by rotations of the letter form, rather than the use of vowel diacritics as is standard in Indic abugidas.) -	Soyombo (Note: May also be derived from Ranjana (see above)) 𑩨	Sylheti Nagari ꠒ	Gunjala Gondi 𑶂	Masaram Gondi (Note: Masaram Gondi acts as an Indic abugida, but its letterforms were not derived from any single precursor script.) 𑴘	Hanuno'o -

== Character encodings of Ḍa ==
Most Indic scripts are encoded in the Unicode Standard, and as such the letter Ḍa in those scripts can be represented in plain text with unique codepoint. Ḍa from several modern-use scripts can also be found in legacy encodings, such as ISCII.

Character information
Preview					డ		ଡ		ಡ		ഡ		ડ		ਡ	
Unicode name	DEVANAGARI LETTER DDA		BENGALI LETTER DDA		TELUGU LETTER DDA		ORIYA LETTER DDA		KANNADA LETTER DDA		MALAYALAM LETTER DDA		GUJARATI LETTER DDA		GURMUKHI LETTER DDA	
Encodings	decimal	hex	dec	hex	dec	hex	dec	hex	dec	hex	dec	hex	dec	hex	dec	hex
Unicode	2337	U+0921	2465	U+09A1	3105	U+0C21	2849	U+0B21	3233	U+0CA1	3361	U+0D21	2721	U+0AA1	2593	U+0A21
UTF-8	224 164 161	E0 A4 A1	224 166 161	E0 A6 A1	224 176 161	E0 B0 A1	224 172 161	E0 AC A1	224 178 161	E0 B2 A1	224 180 161	E0 B4 A1	224 170 161	E0 AA A1	224 168 161	E0 A8 A1
Numeric character reference	&#2337;	&#x921;	&#2465;	&#x9A1;	&#3105;	&#xC21;	&#2849;	&#xB21;	&#3233;	&#xCA1;	&#3361;	&#xD21;	&#2721;	&#xAA1;	&#2593;	&#xA21;
ISCII	191	BF	191	BF	191	BF	191	BF	191	BF	191	BF	191	BF	191	BF

Character information
Preview	Ashoka Kushana Gupta		𐨜				𑌡	
Unicode name	BRAHMI LETTER DDA		KHAROSHTHI LETTER DDA		SIDDHAM LETTER DDA		GRANTHA LETTER DDA	
Encodings	decimal	hex	dec	hex	dec	hex	dec	hex
Unicode	69663	U+1101F	68124	U+10A1C	71066	U+1159A	70433	U+11321
UTF-8	240 145 128 159	F0 91 80 9F	240 144 168 156	F0 90 A8 9C	240 145 150 154	F0 91 96 9A	240 145 140 161	F0 91 8C A1
UTF-16	55300 56351	D804 DC1F	55298 56860	D802 DE1C	55301 56730	D805 DD9A	55300 57121	D804 DF21
Numeric character reference	&#69663;	&#x1101F;	&#68124;	&#x10A1C;	&#71066;	&#x1159A;	&#70433;	&#x11321;

Character information
Preview	ཌ		ྜ		ꡫ		𑨖		𑐜		𑰚		𑆝	
Unicode name	TIBETAN LETTER DDA		TIBETAN SUBJOINED LETTER DDA		PHAGS-PA LETTER DDA		ZANABAZAR SQUARE LETTER DDA		NEWA LETTER DDA		BHAIKSUKI LETTER DDA		SHARADA LETTER DDA	
Encodings	decimal	hex	dec	hex	dec	hex	dec	hex	dec	hex	dec	hex	dec	hex
Unicode	3916	U+0F4C	3996	U+0F9C	43115	U+A86B	72214	U+11A16	70684	U+1141C	72730	U+11C1A	70045	U+1119D
UTF-8	224 189 140	E0 BD 8C	224 190 156	E0 BE 9C	234 161 171	EA A1 AB	240 145 168 150	F0 91 A8 96	240 145 144 156	F0 91 90 9C	240 145 176 154	F0 91 B0 9A	240 145 134 157	F0 91 86 9D
UTF-16	3916	0F4C	3996	0F9C	43115	A86B	55302 56854	D806 DE16	55301 56348	D805 DC1C	55303 56346	D807 DC1A	55300 56733	D804 DD9D
Numeric character reference	&#3916;	&#xF4C;	&#3996;	&#xF9C;	&#43115;	&#xA86B;	&#72214;	&#x11A16;	&#70684;	&#x1141C;	&#72730;	&#x11C1A;	&#70045;	&#x1119D;

Character information
Preview	ဍ		ᨯ		ᦡ		ᦤ		ᧆ	
Unicode name	MYANMAR LETTER DDA		TAI THAM LETTER DA		NEW TAI LUE LETTER HIGH DA		NEW TAI LUE LETTER LOW DA		NEW TAI LUE LETTER FINAL D	
Encodings	decimal	hex	dec	hex	dec	hex	dec	hex	dec	hex
Unicode	4109	U+100D	6703	U+1A2F	6561	U+19A1	6564	U+19A4	6598	U+19C6
UTF-8	225 128 141	E1 80 8D	225 168 175	E1 A8 AF	225 166 161	E1 A6 A1	225 166 164	E1 A6 A4	225 167 134	E1 A7 86
Numeric character reference	&#4109;	&#x100D;	&#6703;	&#x1A2F;	&#6561;	&#x19A1;	&#6564;	&#x19A4;	&#6598;	&#x19C6;

Character information
Preview	ឌ		ຑ		ฑ	
Unicode name	KHMER LETTER DO		LAO LETTER PALI DDA		THAI CHARACTER THO NANGMONTHO	
Encodings	decimal	hex	dec	hex	dec	hex
Unicode	6028	U+178C	3729	U+0E91	3601	U+0E11
UTF-8	225 158 140	E1 9E 8C	224 186 145	E0 BA 91	224 184 145	E0 B8 91
Numeric character reference	&#6028;	&#x178C;	&#3729;	&#xE91;	&#3601;	&#xE11;

Character information
Preview	ඩ		𑄓		𑤘		ꢞ		ꨙ	
Unicode name	SINHALA LETTER ALPAPRAANA DDAYANNA		CHAKMA LETTER DDAA		DIVES AKURU LETTER DDA		SAURASHTRA LETTER DDA		CHAM LETTER DDA	
Encodings	decimal	hex	dec	hex	dec	hex	dec	hex	dec	hex
Unicode	3497	U+0DA9	69907	U+11113	71960	U+11918	43166	U+A89E	43545	U+AA19
UTF-8	224 182 169	E0 B6 A9	240 145 132 147	F0 91 84 93	240 145 164 152	F0 91 A4 98	234 162 158	EA A2 9E	234 168 153	EA A8 99
UTF-16	3497	0DA9	55300 56595	D804 DD13	55302 56600	D806 DD18	43166	A89E	43545	AA19
Numeric character reference	&#3497;	&#xDA9;	&#69907;	&#x11113;	&#71960;	&#x11918;	&#43166;	&#xA89E;	&#43545;	&#xAA19;

Character information
Preview	𑘚		𑦺		𑩨		ꠒ		𑶂			
Unicode name	MODI LETTER DDA		NANDINAGARI LETTER DDA		SOYOMBO LETTER DDA		SYLOTI NAGRI LETTER DDO		GUNJALA GONDI LETTER DDA		KAITHI LETTER DDA	
Encodings	decimal	hex	dec	hex	dec	hex	dec	hex	dec	hex	dec	hex
Unicode	71194	U+1161A	72122	U+119BA	72296	U+11A68	43026	U+A812	73090	U+11D82	69785	U+11099
UTF-8	240 145 152 154	F0 91 98 9A	240 145 166 186	F0 91 A6 BA	240 145 169 168	F0 91 A9 A8	234 160 146	EA A0 92	240 145 182 130	F0 91 B6 82	240 145 130 153	F0 91 82 99
UTF-16	55301 56858	D805 DE1A	55302 56762	D806 DDBA	55302 56936	D806 DE68	43026	A812	55303 56706	D807 DD82	55300 56473	D804 DC99
Numeric character reference	&#71194;	&#x1161A;	&#72122;	&#x119BA;	&#72296;	&#x11A68;	&#43026;	&#xA812;	&#73090;	&#x11D82;	&#69785;	&#x11099;

Character information
Preview	𑒛	
Unicode name	TIRHUTA LETTER DDA	
Encodings	decimal	hex
Unicode	70811	U+1149B
UTF-8	240 145 146 155	F0 91 92 9B
UTF-16	55301 56475	D805 DC9B
Numeric character reference	&#70811;	&#x1149B;

Character information
Preview	𑚖		𑠖		𑈖		𑋈		𑅠		𑊒	
Unicode name	TAKRI LETTER DDA		DOGRA LETTER DDA		KHOJKI LETTER DDA		KHUDAWADI LETTER DDA		MAHAJANI LETTER DDA		MULTANI LETTER DDA	
Encodings	decimal	hex	dec	hex	dec	hex	dec	hex	dec	hex	dec	hex
Unicode	71318	U+11696	71702	U+11816	70166	U+11216	70344	U+112C8	69984	U+11160	70290	U+11292
UTF-8	240 145 154 150	F0 91 9A 96	240 145 160 150	F0 91 A0 96	240 145 136 150	F0 91 88 96	240 145 139 136	F0 91 8B 88	240 145 133 160	F0 91 85 A0	240 145 138 146	F0 91 8A 92
UTF-16	55301 56982	D805 DE96	55302 56342	D806 DC16	55300 56854	D804 DE16	55300 57032	D804 DEC8	55300 56672	D804 DD60	55300 56978	D804 DE92
Numeric character reference	&#71318;	&#x11696;	&#71702;	&#x11816;	&#70166;	&#x11216;	&#70344;	&#x112C8;	&#69984;	&#x11160;	&#70290;	&#x11292;

Character information
Preview	ᬟ		ꦝ	
Unicode name	BALINESE LETTER DA MURDA ALPAPRANA		JAVANESE LETTER DDA	
Encodings	decimal	hex	dec	hex
Unicode	6943	U+1B1F	43421	U+A99D
UTF-8	225 172 159	E1 AC 9F	234 166 157	EA A6 9D
Numeric character reference	&#6943;	&#x1B1F;	&#43421;	&#xA99D;

Character information
Preview	𑴘	
Unicode name	MASARAM GONDI LETTER DDA	
Encodings	decimal	hex
Unicode	72984	U+11D18
UTF-8	240 145 180 152	F0 91 B4 98
UTF-16	55303 56600	D807 DD18
Numeric character reference	&#72984;	&#x11D18;
