= Gol he =

Arabic letter

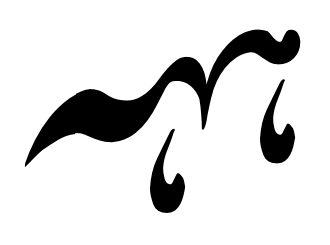
Gol he written thrice (showing the non-isolated forms)

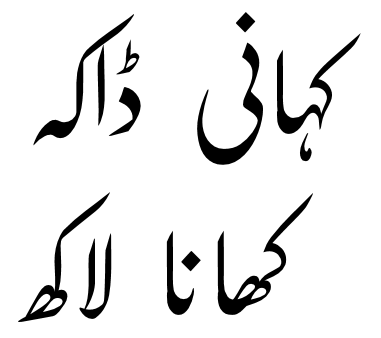
Gol he and do-cas͟hmī he in comparison (word-final and word-medial positions)

Gol he, also called choṭī he, is one of the two variants of the Arabic letter he/hāʾ (ه) that are in use in the Urdu alphabet, the other variant being the do-cas͟hmī he (ھ), also called hā-'e-mak͟hlūt. The letter is named for its shape in the isolated form, gol meaning "round" in Hindustani, to distinguish it from the do-cas͟hmī he, which is really a calligraphic variant of the "two-eyed" regular he in the medial position (ﻬ). Its various non-isolated forms originated in the Nastaʿlīq script or calligraphic hand, though various zigzag (medial) and hook (final) forms of hāʾ have existed before the script was developed.

== Use in Urdu ==
The letter ہ (encoded at U+06C1) replaces the regular he ه (encoded at U+0647) in Urdu (as well as the Kashmiri (other Dardic) and Sindhi Perso-Arabic, plus Punjabi Shahmukhi alphabet) for the voiced glottal fricative [ɦ] but is usually pronounced [ɑː] in the word-final position (exception include certain two-letter words such as وہ /ʋoː/~/woː/ or یہ /jeː/) while the do-cas͟hmī he ھ is used in digraphs for aspiration and breathy voice and hence never used word-initially.

Position in word:	Isolated	Final	Medial	Initial
Naskh glyph form: (Help)	ہ	ـہ	ـہـ	ہـ
Nastaliq glyph form:	ہ	ــــہ	ــــہــــ	ہــــ

For comparison, the do-cas͟hmī he (not used word-initially) and the regular Arabic letter:

Position in word:	Isolated	Final	Medial	Initial
Naskh glyph form: (Help)	ھ	ـھ	ـھـ	ھـ
Nastaliq glyph form:	ھ	ــــھ	ــــھــــ	ھــــ

Position in word:	Isolated	Final	Medial	Initial
Naskh glyph form: (Help)	ه	ـه	ـهـ	هـ
Nastaliq glyph form:	ه	ــــه	ــــهــــ	هــــ

== See also ==
- Nastaʿlīq script
