= Gueh =

Arabic letter

Gueh (ڳ) is an additional letter of the Arabic script, used in Sindhi and Saraiki to represent a voiced velar implosive /ɠ/. It is derived from gāf (گ), with the addition of two dots. It is equivalent to ॻ in Saraiki and Sindhi's Devanagari orthography.

The letter has four forms in total.

Position in word	Isolated	Final	Medial	Initial
Glyph form: (Help)	ڳ	ـڳ	ـڳـ	ڳـ

== Related characters ==
The letter ṅāf (ڱ) is used in Sindhi to represent the velar nasal /ŋ/.

== See also ==
- ٻ
- ݙ
- ڄ
