= Che (Persian letter) =

Letter of the Persian alphabet

- چ

Usage
- Writing system: Arabic script
- Type: Abjad
- Language of origin: Persian language
- Sound values: /tʃ/, /c/
- Alphabetical position: 7

History
- Development: 𓌙: 𐤂; 𐡂; 𐢄; ح; ج; چ
- Transliterations: ch, č

Other
- Writing direction: Right-to-left

Che, Če, Cheem, or Čeem (چ) is a letter of the Persian alphabet, used to represent [t͡ʃ]. The letter derives from Jīm (ج) by the addition of two dots. It is found with this value in other Arabic-derived scripts.

It is used in Persian, Urdu, Pashto, Balochi, Kurdish, Uyghur, Kashmiri, Azerbaijani, Ottoman Turkish, Malay (Jawi), Javanese (Pegon), and other Indo-Iranian languages. It is also one of the five letters the Persian alphabet added to the Arabic script, which are Že (ژ), Pe (پ), and Gaf (گ), in addition the obsolete Ve (ڤ). Its numerical value is 3000 (see Abjad numerals).

Position in word:	Isolated	Final	Medial	Initial
Glyph form: (Help)	چ	ـچ	ـچـ	چـ

== In Arabic ==
The letter Che (چ) can be used to transcribe [t͡ʃ] in Gulf Arabic and Iraqi Arabic dialects, where they have that sound natively as in "چلب" /tʃalb/ (dog) instead of "كلب" /kalb/. Since the sound is not part of Modern Standard Arabic (MSA)'s phonology; In most of the rest of Arabic-speaking geographic regions, the combination of Tāʾ-Šīn (تش) is more likely used to transliterate the /t͡ʃ/ sound which is often realized as two consonants ([t]+[ʃ]) as in "تشاد" /tʃaːd/ (Chad) and "التشيك" /at.tʃiːk/ (Czech Republic). In Moroccan Arabic, the sound /t͡ʃ/ from Spanish is transliterated with the letter ڜ.

In Egypt, this letter represents [ʒ], which can be a reduction of /d͡ʒ/, It is called "Gīm with three dots" (جيم بتلات نقط, Gīm be talat noʾaṭ) there. The /ʒ/ pronunciation is also proposed for South Arabian minority languages, like Mehri and Soqotri.

In Israel, where official announcements are often trilingual or triscripted, this letter represents [ɡ] on roadsigns when transcribing Hebrew place names. It has also been used as /g/ in Lebanon for transliteration such as "چامبيا" (The Gambia) and "چوچل" (Google).

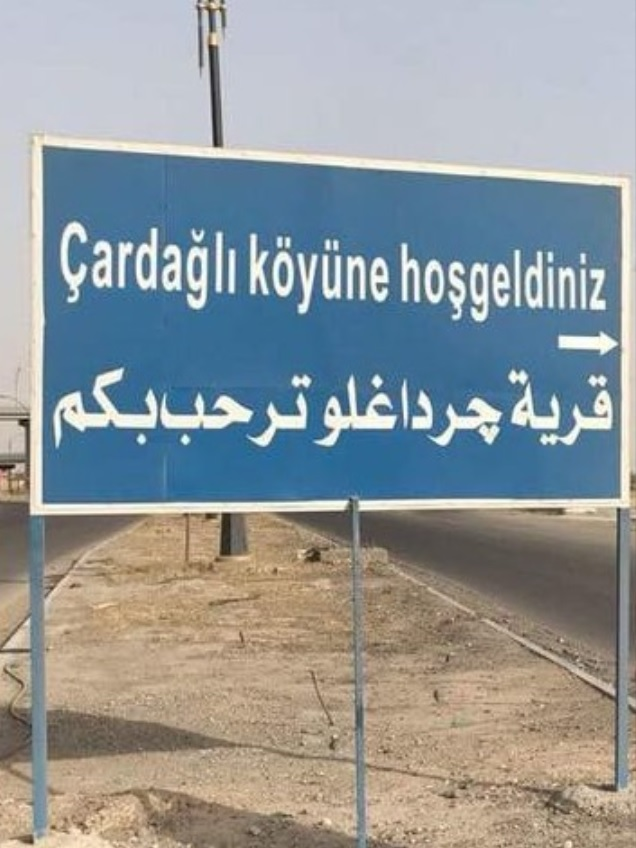
A bilingual road sign at a Turkmen village in Kirkuk Governorate, Iraq. The letter Che (چ) is used to represent the sound [t͡ʃ].

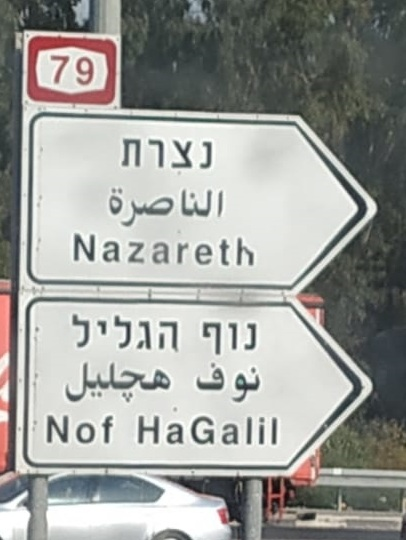
In this triscript road sign (below) in Israel, the letter Che (چ) is used to represent the Hebrew sound [g] in the city Nof HaGalil.

== Character encodings ==
Character information
Preview	چ	
Unicode name	ARABIC LETTER TCHEH	
Encodings	decimal	hex
Unicode	1670	U+0686
UTF-8	218 134	DA 86
Numeric character reference	&#1670;	&#x686;

Character information
Preview	ڜ	
Unicode name	ARABIC LETTER SEEN WITH THREE DOTS BELOW AND THREE DOTS ABOVE	
Encodings	decimal	hex
Unicode	1692	U+069C
UTF-8	218 156	DA 9C
Numeric character reference	&#1692;	&#x69C;

== See also ==
- Gaf (گ)
- Pe (پ)
- Ve (ڤ)
- Že (ژ)
- Č
- Che (Cyrillic)
