= Ṛe =

Letter of the extended Arabic alphabet

Ṛe, also Aṛ, is a letter of the extended Arabic alphabet, based on rāʾ (ر) with the addition of a diacritical ṭāʾ (ط; historically four dots in a square pattern, e.g. ڙ) on top. It is not used in the Arabic alphabet itself, but is used to represent the word-medial and word-final retroflex flap [ɽ] in Urdu, Punjabi written in the Shahmukhi script, and Kashmiri. The small t̤oʾe diacritic is used to indicate a retroflex consonant in Urdu. Its Abjad value is considered to be 200. In Urdu, this letter may also be called rā-ye-musaqqalā ("heavy re") or rā-ye-hindiyā ("Indian re"). In Devanagari, this consonant is rendered using ‘ड़’ (‘ड’ with nuqta below).

Position in word:	Isolated	Final	Medial	Initial
Naskh glyph form: (Help)	ڑ	ـڑ	ـڑ	ڑ
Nastaʿlīq glyph form:	ڑ	ــــڑ	ــــڑ	ڑ

== Character encoding ==
Character information
Preview	ڑ	
Unicode name	ARABIC LETTER RREH	
Encodings	decimal	hex
Unicode	1681	U+0691
UTF-8	218 145	DA 91
Numeric character reference	&#1681;	&#x691;
