= Ḍal =

Letter of the Urdu alphabet, representing a voiced retroflex stop /ɖ/

Ḍal or ḍāl is a letter of the extended Arabic alphabet, derived from dāl (د) by placing a small t̤oʾe (ط; historically four dots in a square pattern, e.g. ڐ) on top. It is not used in the Arabic alphabet itself, but is used to represent a voiced retroflex plosive [ɖ] in Urdu, Punjabi written in the Shahmukhi script, and Kashmiri as well as Balochi. The small t̤oʾe diacritic is used to indicate a retroflex consonant in Urdu. It is the twelfth letter of the Urdu alphabet. Its Abjad value is considered to be 4. In Urdu, this letter may also be called dāl-e-musaqqalā ("heavy dal") or dāl-e-hindiyā ("Indian dal"). In Devanagari, this consonant is rendered using ‘ड’. It is also used in Beja language as its part of its Arabic alphabet of the Beja language.

Position in word:	Isolated	Final	Medial	Initial
Naskh glyph form: (Help)	ڈ	ـڈ	ـڈ	ڈ
Nastaʿlīq glyph form:	ڈ	ــــڈ	ــــڈ	ڈ

== Character encoding ==
Character information
Preview	ڈ	
Unicode name	ARABIC LETTER DDAL	
Encodings	decimal	hex
Unicode	1672	U+0688
UTF-8	218 136	DA 88
Numeric character reference	&#1672;	&#x688;
