= Ṭe =

Variation of the Arabic letters in Unicode

Ṭe is a letter of the extended Arabic alphabet, derived from te (ت) by replacing the dots with a small t̤oʾe (ط; historically four dots in a square pattern, e.g. ٿ (Note: The same glyph is used in modern Sindhi to represent [t̪ʰ].)). It is not used in the Arabic alphabet itself, but is used to represent an voiceless retroflex plosive [ʈ] in Urdu, Punjabi written in the Shahmukhi script, and Kashmiri as well as Balochi. The small t̤oʾe diacritic is used to indicate a retroflex consonant in Urdu. It is the fifth letter of the Urdu alphabet. Its Abjad value is considered to be 400. In Urdu, this letter may also be called tā-ye-musaqqalā ("heavy te") or tā-ye-hindiyā ("Indian te"). In Devanagari, this consonant is rendered using ‘ट’.

| Position in word: | Isolated | Final | Medial | Initial |
|---|---|---|---|---|
| Naskh glyph form: (Help) | ٹ | ـٹ | ـٹـ | ٹـ |
| Nastaliq glyph form: | ٹ | ــــٹ | ــــٹــــ | ٹــــ |

== Character encoding ==
Character information
| Preview | ٹ | |
|---|---|---|
| Unicode name | ARABIC LETTER TTEH | |
| Encodings | decimal | hex |
| Unicode | 1657 | U+0679 |
| UTF-8 | 217 185 | D9 B9 |
| Numeric character reference | &#1657; | &#x679; |

Some layout engines do not properly generate the medial and initial forms (which should look like ـٹـ and ﭨ) and will render the isolate form ٹ, without joining.
