= Arabic script in Unicode =

Writing system

As of Unicode 18.0, the Arabic script is contained in the following blocks:

- Arabic (0600–06FF, 256 characters)
- Arabic Supplement (0750–077F, 48 characters)
- Arabic Extended-B (0870–089F, 43 characters)
- Arabic Extended-A (08A0–08FF, 96 characters)
- Arabic Presentation Forms-A (FB50–FDFF, 656 characters)
- Arabic Presentation Forms-B (FE70–FEFF, 141 characters)
- Rumi Numeral Symbols (10E60–10E7F, 31 characters)
- Arabic Extended-C (10EC0–10EFF, 60 characters)
- Indic Siyaq Numbers (1EC70–1ECBF, 68 characters)
- Ottoman Siyaq Numbers (1ED00–1ED4F, 61 characters)
- Arabic Mathematical Alphabetic Symbols (1EE00–1EEFF, 143 characters)

The Arabic block encodes the standard letters and diacritics, but does not encode contextual forms (U+0621–U+0652 being directly based on ISO 8859-6); and also includes the most common diacritics and Arabic-Indic digits. Arabic Supplement encodes letter variants mostly used for writing African (non-Arabic) languages. Arabic Extended-B and Arabic Extended-A encode additional Qur'anic annotations and letter variants used for various non-Arabic languages. Arabic Mathematical Alphabetical Symbols encodes characters used in Arabic mathematical expressions. Indic Siyaq Numbers contains a specialized subset of Arabic script that was used for accounting in India under the Mughal Empire by the 17th century through the middle of the 20th century. Ottoman Siyaq Numbers contains a specialized subset of Arabic script, also known as Siyakat numbers, used for accounting in Ottoman Turkish documents.

Arabic Presentation Forms-A encodes contextual forms and ligatures used by older encodings for Persian, Urdu, Sindhi and Central Asian languages. Arabic Presentation Forms-B encodes spacing forms of Arabic diacritics, and more contextual letter forms. The presentation forms are present only for compatibility with older standards, and are not currently needed for correctly rendering text.

== Contextual forms ==
Below is a demonstration for the basic alphabet used in Modern Standard Arabic illustrating how Arabic letters are expected to appear in different contexts. Codepoints listed as contextual forms "should not be used in general interchange". Unicode has other methods of encoding the difference if necessary, such as Zero-width joiner.

General Unicode	Contextual forms				Name
General Unicode	Isolated	Final (End)	Medial (Middle)	Initial (Beginning)	Name
0627 ا	FE8D ﺍ	FE8E ﺎ			ʾalif
0628 ب	FE8F ﺏ	FE90 ﺐ	FE92 ﺒ	FE91 ﺑ	bāʾ
062A ت	FE95 ﺕ	FE96 ﺖ	FE98 ﺘ	FE97 ﺗ	tāʾ
062B ث	FE99 ﺙ	FE9A ﺚ	FE9C ﺜ	FE9B ﺛ	ṯāʾ
062C ج	FE9D ﺝ	FE9E ﺞ	FEA0 ﺠ	FE9F ﺟ	ǧīm
062D ح	FEA1 ﺡ	FEA2 ﺢ	FEA4 ﺤ	FEA3 ﺣ	ḥāʾ
062E خ	FEA5 ﺥ	FEA6 ﺦ	FEA8 ﺨ	FEA7 ﺧ	ḫāʾ
062F د	FEA9 ﺩ	FEAA ﺪ			dāl
0630 ذ	FEAB ﺫ	FEAC ﺬ			ḏāl
0631 ر	FEAD ﺭ	FEAE ﺮ			rāʾ
0632 ز	FEAF ﺯ	FEB0 ﺰ			zayn/zāy
0633 س	FEB1 ﺱ	FEB2 ﺲ	FEB4 ﺴ	FEB3 ﺳ	sīn
0634 ش	FEB5 ﺵ	FEB6 ﺶ	FEB8 ﺸ	FEB7 ﺷ	šīn
0635 ص	FEB9 ﺹ	FEBA ﺺ	FEBC ﺼ	FEBB ﺻ	ṣād
0636 ض	FEBD ﺽ	FEBE ﺾ	FEC0 ﻀ	FEBF ﺿ	ḍād
0637 ط	FEC1 ﻁ	FEC2 ﻂ	FEC4 ﻄ	FEC3 ﻃ	ṭāʾ
0638 ظ	FEC5 ﻅ	FEC6 ﻆ	FEC8 ﻈ	FEC7 ﻇ	ẓāʾ
0639 ع	FEC9 ﻉ	FECA ﻊ	FECC ﻌ	FECB ﻋ	ʿayn
063A غ	FECD ﻍ	FECE ﻎ	FED0 ﻐ	FECF ﻏ	ġayn
0641 ف	FED1 ﻑ	FED2 ﻒ	FED4 ﻔ	FED3 ﻓ	fāʾ
0642 ق	FED5 ﻕ	FED6 ﻖ	FED8 ﻘ	FED7 ﻗ	qāf
0643 ك	FED9 ﻙ	FEDA ﻚ	FEDC ﻜ	FEDB ﻛ	kāf
0644 ل	FEDD ﻝ	FEDE ﻞ	FEE0 ﻠ	FEDF ﻟ	lām
0645 م	FEE1 ﻡ	FEE2 ﻢ	FEE4 ﻤ	FEE3 ﻣ	mīm
0646 ن	FEE5 ﻥ	FEE6 ﻦ	FEE8 ﻨ	FEE7 ﻧ	nūn
0647 ه	FEE9 ﻩ	FEEA ﻪ	FEEC ﻬ	FEEB ﻫ	hāʾ
0648 و	FEED ﻭ	FEEE ﻮ			wāw
064A ي	FEF1 ﻱ	FEF2 ﻲ	FEF4 ﻴ	FEF3 ﻳ	yāʾ
0622 آ	FE81 ﺁ	FE82 ﺂ			ʾalif maddah
0629 ة	FE93 ﺓ	FE94 ﺔ	—	—	Tāʾ marbūṭah
0649 ى	FEEF ﻯ	FEF0 ﻰ	—	—	ʾalif maqṣūrah

== Punctuation and ornaments ==
Only the Arabic question mark ⟨؟⟩ and the Arabic comma ⟨،⟩ are used in regular Arabic script typing and the comma is often substituted for the Latin script comma ⟨,⟩ which is also used as the decimal separator when the Eastern Arabic numerals are used (e.g. ⟨100.6⟩ compared to ⟨١٠٠,٦⟩).

- U+060C ، ARABIC COMMA
- U+060D ؍ ARABIC DATE SEPARATOR
- U+060E ؎ ARABIC POETIC VERSE SIGN
- U+060F ؏ ARABIC SIGN MISRA
- U+061B ؛ ARABIC SEMICOLON
- U+061E ؞ ARABIC TRIPLE DOT PUNCTUATION MARK
- U+061F ؟ ARABIC QUESTION MARK
- U+066D ٭ ARABIC FIVE POINTED STAR
- U+06D4 ۔ ARABIC FULL STOP
- U+06DD ۝ ARABIC END OF AYAH
- U+06DE ۞ ARABIC START OF RUB EL HIZB
- U+06E9 ۩ ARABIC PLACE OF SAJDAH
- U+06FD ۽ ARABIC SIGN SINDHI AMPERSAND
- U+FD3E ﴾ Arabic ornate left parenthesis
- U+FD3F ﴿ Arabic ornate right parenthesis

== Word ligatures ==
Arabic Presentation Forms-A has a few characters defined as "word ligatures" for terms frequently used in formulaic expressions in Arabic. They are rarely used out of professional liturgical typing. Note that the Rial grapheme is normally written fully, not by the ligature.

- U+FDF0 ﷰ ARABIC LIGATURE SALLA USED AS KORANIC STOP SIGN ISOLATED FORM (صلى, stylized as صلے)
- U+FDF1 ﷱ ARABIC LIGATURE QALA USED AS KORANIC STOP SIGN ISOLATED FORM (قلى, stylized as قلے)
- U+FDF2 ﷲ ARABIC LIGATURE ALLAH ISOLATED FORM (اللّٰه)
- U+FDF3 ﷳ ARABIC LIGATURE AKBAR ISOLATED FORM (أكبر), as in the phrase الله أكبر allāhu ʼakbar
- U+FDF4 ﷴ ARABIC LIGATURE MOHAMMAD ISOLATED FORM (مُحَمَّد)
- U+FDF5 ﷵ ARABIC LIGATURE SALAM ISOLATED FORM (صلعم, the abbreviation for صلى الله عليه وسلم 'peace be upon him')
- U+FDF6 ﷶ ARABIC LIGATURE RASOUL ISOLATED FORM (رسول)
- U+FDF7 ﷷ ARABIC LIGATURE ALAYHE ISOLATED FORM (عليه)
- U+FDF8 ﷸ ARABIC LIGATURE WASALLAM ISOLATED FORM (وسلم)
- U+FDF9 ﷹ ARABIC LIGATURE SALLA ISOLATED FORM (صلى)
- U+FDFA ﷺ ARABIC LIGATURE SALLALLAHOU ALAYHE WASALLAM (صَلَّى ٱللَّٰهُ عَلَيْهِ وَسَلَّمَ 'peace be upon him' ṣallā llāhu ʻalayhi wa-sallama)
- U+FDFB ﷻ ARABIC LIGATURE JALLAJALALOUHOU (جَلَّ جَلَالُهُ jalla jalāluhu)
- U+FDFC ﷼ RIAL SIGN (ريال)
- U+FDFD ﷽ ARABIC LIGATURE BISMILLAH AR-RAHMAN AR-RAHEEM (بِسْمِ ٱللَّٰهِ ٱلرَّحْمَٰنِ ٱلرَّحِيمِ bi-smi llāhi r-raḥmāni r-raḥīmi)

== Code blocks ==
=== Arabic ===
==== Character table ====
Code	Result	Unicode name
U+0600	؀	Arabic Number Sign
U+0601	؁	Arabic Sign Sanah
U+0602	؂	Arabic Footnote Marker
U+0603	؃	Arabic Sign Safha
U+0604	؄	Arabic Sign Samvat used for writing Samvat era dates in Urdu
U+0605	؅	Arabic Number Mark Above may be used with Coptic Epact numbers
U+0606	؆	Arabic-Indic Cube Root → U+221B ∛ Cube Root
U+0607	؇	Arabic-Indic Fourth Root → U+221C ∜ Fourth Root
U+0608	؈	Arabic Ray
U+0609	؉	Arabic-Indic Per Mille Sign → U+2030 ‰ Per Mille Sign
U+060A	؊	Arabic-Indic Per Ten Thousand Sign → U+2031‱ Per Ten Thousand Sign
U+060B	؋	Afghani Sign
U+060C	،	Arabic Comma also used with Thaana and Syriac in modern text → U+002C , Comma → U+2E32 ⸲ Turned Comma → U+2E41 ⹁ Reversed Comma
U+060D	؍	Arabic Date Separator
U+060E	؎	Arabic Poetic Verse Sign
U+060F	؏	Arabic Sign Misra
U+0610	ؐ	Arabic Sign Sallallahou Alayhe Wassallam represents sallallahu alayhe wasallam "may God's peace and blessings be upon him"
U+0611	ؑ	Arabic Sign Alayhe Assallam represents alayhe assalam "upon him be peace"
U+0612	ؒ	Arabic Sign Rahmatullah Alayhe represents rahmatullah alayhe "may God have mercy upon him"
U+0613	ؓ	Arabic Sign Radi Allahou Anhu represents radi allahu 'anhu "may God be pleased with him"
U+0614	ؔ	Arabic Sign Takhallus sign placed over the name or nom-de-plume of a poet, or in some writings used to mark all proper names
U+0615	ؕ	Arabic Small High Tah marks a recommended pause position in some Qurans published in Iran and Pakistan should not be confused with the small TAH sign used as a diacritic for some letters such as 0679
U+0616	ؖ	Arabic Small High Ligature Alef With Lam With Yeh early Persian Arabic Small High Ligature Alef With Yeh Barree
U+0617	ؗ	Arabic Small High Zain
U+0618	ؘ	Arabic Small Fatha should not be confused with 064E Fatha
U+0619	ؙ	Arabic Small Damma should not be confused with 064F Damma
U+061A	ؚ	Arabic Small Kasra should not be confused with 0650 Kasra
U+061B	؛	Arabic Semicolon also used with Thaana and Syriac in modern text → U+003B ; Semicolon → U+204F ⁏ Reversed Semicolon → U+2E35 ⸵ Turned Semicolon
U+061C		Arabic Letter Mark (Alm)
U+061D	؝	Arabic End Of Text Mark
U+061E	؞	Arabic Triple Dot Punctuation Mark
U+061F	؟	Arabic Question Mark also used with Thaana and Syriac in modern text → U+003F ? Question Mark → U+2E2E ⸮ Reversed Question Mark
U+0620	ؠ	Arabic Letter Kashmiri Yeh
U+0621	ء	Arabic Letter Hamza → U+02BE ʾ Modifier Letter Right Half Ring
U+0622	آ	Arabic Letter Alef With Madda Above ≡ آ U+0627 U+0653
U+0623	أ	Arabic Letter Alef With Hamza Above ≡ أ U+0627 U+0654
U+0624	ؤ	Arabic Letter Waw With Hamza Above ≡ ؤ U+0648 U+0654
U+0625	إ	Arabic Letter Alef With Hamza Below ≡ إ U+0627 U+0655
U+0626	ئ	Arabic Letter Yeh With Hamza Above in Kyrgyz the hamza is consistently positioned to the top right in isolate and final forms ≡ ئ U+064A U+0654
U+0627	ا	Arabic Letter Alef
U+0628	ب	Arabic Letter Beh
U+0629	ة	Arabic Letter Teh Marbuta
U+062A	ت	Arabic Letter Teh
U+062B	ث	Arabic Letter The
U+062C	ج	Arabic Letter Jeem
U+062D	ح	Arabic Letter Hah
U+062E	خ	Arabic Letter Khah
U+062F	د	Arabic Letter Dal
U+0630	ذ	Arabic Letter Thal
U+0631	ر	Arabic Letter Reh
U+0632	ز	Arabic Letter Zain
U+0633	س	Arabic Letter Seen
U+0634	ش	Arabic Letter Sheen
U+0635	ص	Arabic Letter Sad
U+0636	ض	Arabic Letter Dad
U+0637	ط	Arabic Letter Tah
U+0638	ظ	Arabic Letter Zah
U+0639	ع	Arabic Letter Ain → U+01B9 ƹ Latin Small Letter Ezh Reversed → U+02BF ʿ MODIFIER LETTER LEFT HALF RING
U+063A	غ	Arabic Letter Ghain
U+063B	ػ	Arabic Letter Keheh With Two Dots Above
U+063C	ؼ	Arabic Letter Keheh With Three Dots Below
U+063D	ؽ	Arabic Letter Farsi Yeh With Inverted V Azerbaijani
U+063E	ؾ	Arabic Letter Farsi Yeh With Two Dots Above
U+063F	ؿ	Arabic Letter Farsi Yeh With Three Dots Above
U+0640	ـ	Arabic Tatweel inserted to stretch characters or to carry tashkil with no base letter also used with Adlam, Hanifi Rohingya, Mandaic, Manichaean, Psalter Pahlavi, Sogdian, and Syriac= kashida
U+0641	ف	Arabic Letter Feh
U+0642	ق	Arabic Letter Qaf
U+0643	ك	Arabic Letter Kaf
U+0644	ل	Arabic Letter Lam
U+0645	م	Arabic Letter Meem Sindhi uses a shape with a short tail
U+0646	ن	Arabic Letter Noon
U+0647	ه	Arabic Letter Heh
U+0648	و	Arabic Letter Waw
U+0649	ى	Arabic Letter Alef Maksura represents YEH-shaped dual-joining letter with no dots in any positional form not intended for use in combination with 0654 → U+0626 ئ Arabic Letter Yeh With Hamza Above
U+064A	ي	Arabic Letter Yeh loses its dots when used in combination with 0654 retains its dots when used in combination with other combining marks → U+08A8 ࢨ Arabic Letter Yeh With Two Dots Below And Hamza Above
U+064B	ً	Arabic Fathatan
U+064C	ٌ	Arabic Dammatan → The handwritten / Quranic form: U+08F1 ࣱ Another alternative form is written as two intertwined dammas, one of which is turned 180 degrees U+08E8 ࣨ
U+064D	ٍ	Arabic Kasratan
U+064E	َ	Arabic Fatha
U+064F	ُ	Arabic Damma
U+0650	ِ	Arabic Kasra
U+0651	ّ	Arabic Shadda
U+0652	ْ	Arabic Sukun marks absence of a vowel after the base consonant can have a variety of shapes, including a circular one and a shape that looks like '06E1' → U+06E1 ۡ Arabic Small High Dotless Head Of Khah
U+0653	ٓ	Arabic Maddah Above used for madd jaa'iz in South Asian and Indonesian orthographies → U+089C ࢜ Arabic Madda Waajib → U+089E ࢞ Arabic Doubled Madda → U+089F ࢟ Arabic Half Madda Over Madda
U+0654	ٔ	Arabic Hamza Above restricted to hamza and ezafe semantics is not used as a diacritic to form new letters
U+0655	ٕ	Arabic Hamza Below
U+0656	ٖ	Arabic Subscript Alef
U+0657	ٗ	Arabic Inverted Damma Kashmiri, Urdu, Swahili, Somali
U+0658	٘	Arabic Mark Noon Ghunna Baluchi indicates nasalization in Urdu
U+0659	ٙ	Arabic Zwarakay Pashto
U+065A	ٚ	Arabic Vowel Sign Small V Above African languages
U+065B	ٛ	Arabic Vowel Sign Inverted Small V Above African languages
U+065C	ٜ	Arabic Vowel Sign Dot Below African languages also used in Quranic text in African and other orthographies
U+065D	ٝ	Arabic Reversed Damma African languages
U+065E	ٞ	Arabic Fatha With Two Dots Kalami
U+065F	ٟ	Arabic Wavy Hamza Below Kashmiri
U+0660	٠	Arabic-Indic Digit Zero
U+0661	١	Arabic-Indic Digit One
U+0662	٢	Arabic-Indic Digit Two
U+0663	٣	Arabic-Indic Digit Three
U+0664	٤	Arabic-Indic Digit Four
U+0665	٥	Arabic-Indic Digit Five
U+0666	٦	Arabic-Indic Digit Six
U+0667	٧	Arabic-Indic Digit Seven
U+0668	٨	Arabic-Indic Digit Eight
U+0669	٩	Arabic-Indic Digit Nine
U+066A	٪	Arabic Percent Sign → U+0025 % Percent Sign
U+066B	٫	Arabic Decimal Separator the ordinary comma is most commonly used instead → U+002C , Comma
U+066C	٬	Arabic Thousands Separator the Arabic comma is most commonly used instead → U+060C ، Arabic Comma → U+0027 ' Apostrophe → U+2019 ’ Right Single Quotation Mark
U+066D	٭	Arabic Five Pointed Star appearance rather variable → U+002A * Asterisk
U+066E	ٮ	Arabic Letter Dotless Beh
U+066F	ٯ	Arabic Letter Dotless Qaf
U+0670	ٰ	Arabic Letter Superscript Alef
U+0671	ٱ	Arabic Letter Alef Wasla Quranic Arabic
U+0672	ٲ	Arabic Letter Alef With Wavy Hamza Above Baluchi, Kashmiri
U+0673	ٳ	Arabic Letter Alef With Wavy Hamza Below (deprecated) Kashmiri This character is deprecated and its use is strongly discouraged; the sequence 0627 065F is the preferred way of encoding this character.
U+0674	ٴ	Arabic Letter High Hamza Kazakh, Jawi forms digraphs
U+0675	ٵ	Arabic Letter High Hamza Alef preferred spelling is ٴا U+0674 U+0627
U+0676	ٶ	Arabic Letter High Hamza Waw preferred spelling is ٴو U+0674 U+0648
U+0677	ٷ	Arabic Letter U With Hamza Above preferred spelling is ٴۇ U+0674 U+06C7
U+0678	ٸ	Arabic Letter High Hamza Yeh preferred spelling is ٴی U+0674 06CC
U+0679	ٹ	Arabic Letter Tteh Urdu
U+067A	ٺ	Arabic Letter Tteheh Sindhi
U+067B	ٻ	Arabic Letter Beeh Sindhi
U+067C	ټ	Arabic Letter Teh With Ring Pashto
U+067D	ٽ	Arabic Letter Teh With Three Dots Above Downwards Sindhi
U+067E	پ	Arabic Letter Peh Persian, Urdu, ...
U+067F	ٿ	Arabic Letter Teheh Sindhi
U+0680	ڀ	Arabic Letter Beheh Sindhi
U+0681	ځ	Arabic Letter Hah With Hamza Above Pashto, Sarikoli represents the phoneme /dz/
U+0682	ڂ	Arabic Letter Hah With Two Dots Vertical Above not used in modern Pashto
U+0683	ڃ	Arabic Letter Nyeh Sindhi
U+0684	ڄ	Arabic Letter Dyeh Sindhi, historically Bosnian
U+0685	څ	Arabic Letter Hah With Three Dots Above Pashto, Khwarazmian, Sarikoli represents the phoneme /ts/ in Pashto
U+0686	چ	Arabic Letter Tcheh Persian, Urdu, ...
U+0687	ڇ	Arabic Letter Tcheheh Sindhi
U+0688	ڈ	Arabic Letter Ddal Urdu
U+0689	ډ	Arabic Letter Dal With Ring Pashto
U+068A	ڊ	Arabic Letter Dal With Dot Below Sindhi, early Persian, Pegon, Malagasy
U+068B	ڋ	Arabic Letter Dal With Dot Below And Small Tah Lahnda
U+068C	ڌ	Arabic Letter Dahal Sindhi
U+068D	ڍ	Arabic Letter Ddahal Sindhi
U+068E	ڎ	Arabic Letter Dul older shape for DUL, now obsolete in Sindhi Burushaski
U+068F	ڏ	Arabic Letter Dal With Three Dots Above Downwards Sindhi current shape used for DUL
U+0690	ڐ	Arabic Letter Dal With Four Dots Above Old Urdu, not in current use
U+0691	ڑ	Arabic Letter Rreh Urdu
U+0692	ڒ	Arabic Letter Reh With Small V Kurdish
U+0693	ړ	Arabic Letter Reh With Ring Pashto
U+0694	ڔ	Arabic Letter Reh With Dot Below Kurdish, early Persian
U+0695	ڕ	Arabic Letter Reh With Small V Below Kurdish
U+0696	ږ	Arabic Letter Reh With Dot Below And Dot Above Pashto
U+0697	ڗ	Arabic Letter Reh With Two Dots Above Dargwa
U+0698	ژ	Arabic Letter Jeh Persian, Urdu, ...
U+0699	ڙ	Arabic Letter Reh With Four Dots Above Sindhi
U+069A	ښ	Arabic Letter Seen With Dot Below And Dot Above Pashto
U+069B	ڛ	Arabic Letter Seen With Three Dots Below early Persian
U+069C	ڜ	Arabic Letter Seen With Three Dots Below And Three Dots Above Moroccan Arabic
U+069D	ڝ	Arabic Letter Sad With Two Dots Below Turkic
U+069E	ڞ	Arabic Letter Sad With Three Dots Above Berber, Burushaski
U+069F	ڟ	Arabic Letter Tah With Three Dots Above Old Hausa
U+06A0	ڠ	Arabic Letter Ain With Three Dots Above Jawi
U+06A1	ڡ	Arabic Letter Dotless Feh Adighe
U+06A2	ڢ	Arabic Letter Feh With Dot Moved Below Maghrib Arabic
U+06A3	ڣ	Arabic Letter Feh With Dot Below Ingush
U+06A4	ڤ	Arabic Letter Veh Middle Eastern Arabic for foreign words Kurdish, Khwarazmian, early Persian, Jawi
U+06A5	ڥ	Arabic Letter Feh With Three Dots Below North African Arabic for foreign words
U+06A6	ڦ	Arabic Letter Peheh Sindhi
U+06A7	ڧ	Arabic Letter Qaf With Dot Above Maghrib Arabic, Uyghur
U+06A8	ڨ	Arabic Letter Qaf With Three Dots Above Tunisian and Algerian Arabic
U+06A9	ک	Arabic Letter Keheh Persian, Urdu, Sindhi, ...= kaf mashkula
U+06AA	ڪ	Arabic Letter Swash Kaf represents a letter distinct from Arabic KAF (0643) in Sindhi
U+06AB	ګ	Arabic Letter Kaf With Ring Pashto may appear like an Arabic KAF (0643) with a ring below the base
U+06AC	ڬ	Arabic Letter Kaf With Dot Above use for the Jawi gaf is not recommended, although it may be found in some existing text data; recommended character for Jawi gaf is 0762 → U+0762 ݢ Arabic Letter Keheh With Dot Above
U+06AD	ڭ	Arabic Letter Ng Uyghur, Kazakh, Moroccan Arabic, early Jawi, early Persian, ...
U+06AE	ڮ	Arabic Letter Kaf With Three Dots Below Berber, early Persian Pegon alternative for 08B4
U+06AF	گ	Arabic Letter Gaf Persian, Urdu, ...
U+06B0	ڰ	Arabic Letter Gaf With Ring Lahnda
U+06B1	ڱ	Arabic Letter Ngoeh Sindhi
U+06B2	ڲ	Arabic Letter Gaf With Two Dots Below not used in Sindhi
U+06B3	ڳ	Arabic Letter Gueh Sindhi, Saraiki
U+06B4	ڴ	Arabic Letter Gaf With Three Dots Above not used in Sindhi, Karakalpak
U+06B5	ڵ	Arabic Letter Lam With Small V Kurdish, historically Bosnian
U+06B6	ڶ	Arabic Letter Lam With Dot Above Kurdish
U+06B7	ڷ	Arabic Letter Lam With Three Dots Above Kurdish
U+06B8	ڸ	Arabic Letter Lam With Three Dots Below Avar, Soqotri
U+06B9	ڹ	Arabic Letter Noon With Dot Below
U+06BA	ں	Arabic Letter Noon Ghunna Urdu, archaic Arabic dotless in all four contextual forms
U+06BB	ڻ	Arabic Letter Rnoon dotless in all four contextual forms Sindhi
U+06BC	ڼ	Arabic Letter Noon With Ring Pashto
U+06BD	ڽ	Arabic Letter Noon With Three Dots Above Jawi, the three dots in initial and medial forms are placed below the letter and inverted upside down, resembling پ
U+06BE	ھ	Arabic Letter Heh Doachashmee forms aspirate digraphs in Urdu and other languages of South Asia represents the glottal fricative /h/ in Uyghur
U+06BF	ڿ	Arabic Letter Tcheh With Dot Above
U+06C0	ۀ	Arabic Letter Heh With Yeh Above for ezafe, use 0654 over the language-appropriate base letter actually a ligature, not an independent letter Arabic letter hamzah on ha (1.0) ≡ ۀ U+06D5 U+0654
U+06C1	ہ	Arabic Letter Heh Goal Urdu
U+06C2	ۂ	Arabic Letter Heh Goal With Hamza Above Urdu actually a ligature, not an independent letter ≡ ۂ U+06C1 U+0654
U+06C3	ۃ	Arabic Letter Teh Marbuta Goal Urdu
U+06C4	ۄ	Arabic Letter Waw With Ring Kashmiri
U+06C5	ۅ	Arabic Letter Kirghiz Oe Kyrgyz a glyph variant occurs which replaces the looped tail with a horizontal bar through the tail
U+06C6	ۆ	Arabic Letter Oe Uyghur, Kurdish, Kazakh, Azerbaijani, historically Bosnian
U+06C7	ۇ	Arabic Letter U Azerbaijani, Kazakh, Kyrgyz, Uyghur
U+06C8	ۈ	Arabic Letter Yu Uyghur
U+06C9	ۉ	Arabic Letter Kirghiz Yu Kazakh, Kyrgyz, historically Bosnian
U+06CA	ۊ	Arabic Letter Waw With Two Dots Above Kurdish
U+06CB	ۋ	Arabic Letter Ve Uyghur, Kazakh
U+06CC	ی	Arabic Letter Farsi Yeh Arabic, Persian, Urdu, Kashmiri, ... initial and medial forms of this letter have dots → U+0649 ى ARABIC LETTER ALEF MAKSURA → U+064A ي Arabic Letter Yeh
U+06CD	ۍ	Arabic Letter Yeh With Tail Pashto, Sindhi
U+06CE	ێ	Arabic Letter Yeh With Small V Kurdish
U+06CF	ۏ	Arabic Letter Waw With Dot Above Jawi
U+06D0	ې	Arabic Letter E Pashto, Uyghur used as the letter bbeh in Sindhi
U+06D1	ۑ	Arabic Letter Yeh With Three Dots Below Mende languages, Hausa
U+06D2	ے	Arabic Letter Yeh Barree Urdu
U+06D3	ۓ	Arabic Letter Yeh Barree With Hamza Above Urdu
U+06D4	۔	Arabic Full Stop Urdu
U+06D5	ە	Arabic Letter Ae Uyghur, Kazakh, Kyrgyz
U+06D6	ۖ	Arabic Small High Ligature Sad With Lam With Alef Maksura
U+06D7	ۗ	Arabic Small High Ligature Qaf With Lam With Alef Maksura
U+06D8	ۘ	Arabic Small High Meem Initial Form
U+06D9	ۙ	Arabic Small High Lam Alef
U+06DA	ۚ	Arabic Small High Jeem
U+06DB	ۛ	Arabic Small High Three Dots
U+06DC	ۜ	Arabic Small High Seen
U+06DD	۝	Arabic End of Ayah
U+06DE	۞	Arabic Start of Rub El Hizb
U+06DF	۟	Arabic Small High Rounded Zero smaller than the typical circular shape used for 0652. Used in some Qurans to mark a long vowel as ignored
U+06E0	۠	Arabic Small High Upright Rectangular Zero the term "rectangular zero" is a translation of the Arabic name of this sign
U+06E1	ۡ	Arabic Small High Dotless Head Of Khah presentation form of 0652, using font technology to select the variant is preferred used in some Qurans to mark absence of a vowel= Arabic jazm → U+0652 ْ Arabic Sukun
U+06E2	ۢ	Arabic Small High Meem Isolated Form
U+06E3	ۣ	Arabic Small Low Seen
U+06E4	ۤ	Arabic Small High Madda typically used with 06E5, 06E6, 06E7, and 08F3
U+06E5	ۥ	Arabic Small Waw → U+08D3 ࣓ Arabic Small Low Waw → U+08F3 ࣳ Arabic Small High Waw
U+06E6	ۦ	Arabic Small Yeh
U+06E7	ۧ	Arabic Small High Yeh
U+06E8	ۨ	Arabic Small High Noon
U+06E9	۩	Arabic Place Of Sajdah there is a range of acceptable glyphs for this character
U+06EA	۪	Arabic Empty Centre Low Stop
U+06EB	۫	Arabic Empty Centre High Stop
U+06EC	۬	Arabic Rounded High Stop With Filled Centre also used in Quranic text in African and other orthographies to represent wasla, ikhtilas, etc.
U+06ED	ۭ	Arabic Small Low Meem
U+06EE	ۮ	Arabic Letter Dal With Inverted V
U+06EF	ۯ	Arabic Letter Reh With Inverted V also used in early Persian
U+06F0	۰	Extended Arabic-Indic Digit Zero
U+06F1	۱	Extended Arabic-Indic Digit One
U+06F2	۲	Extended Arabic-Indic Digit Two
U+06F3	۳	Extended Arabic-Indic Digit Three
U+06F4	۴	Extended Arabic-Indic Digit Four Persian has a different glyph than Sindhi and Urdu
U+06F5	۵	Extended Arabic-Indic Digit Five Persian, Sindhi, and Urdu share glyph different from Arabic
U+06F6	۶	Extended Arabic-Indic Digit Six Persian, Sindhi, and Urdu have glyphs different from Arabic
U+06F7	۷	Extended Arabic-Indic Digit Seven Urdu and Sindhi have glyphs different from Arabic
U+06F8	۸	Extended Arabic-Indic Digit Eight
U+06F9	۹	Extended Arabic-Indic Digit Nine
U+06FA	ۺ	Arabic Letter Sheen With Dot Below
U+06FB	ۻ	Arabic Letter Dad With Dot Below
U+06FC	ۼ	Arabic Letter Ghain With Dot Below
U+06FD	۽	Arabic Sign Sindhi Ampersand
U+06FE	۾	Arabic Sign Sindhi Postposition Men
U+06FF	ۿ	Arabic Letter Heh With Inverted V

==== Compact table ====
Arabic^{[1]}^{[2]} Official Unicode Consortium code chart (PDF)
	0	1	2	3	4	5	6	7	8	9	A	B	C	D	E	F
U+060x	؀	؁	؂	؃	؄	؅	؆	؇	؈	؉	؊	؋	،	؍	؎	؏
U+061x	ؐ	ؑ	ؒ	ؓ	ؔ	ؕ	ؖ	ؗ	ؘ	ؙ	ؚ	؛	ALM	؝	؞	؟
U+062x	ؠ	ء	آ	أ	ؤ	إ	ئ	ا	ب	ة	ت	ث	ج	ح	خ	د
U+063x	ذ	ر	ز	س	ش	ص	ض	ط	ظ	ع	غ	ػ	ؼ	ؽ	ؾ	ؿ
U+064x	ـ	ف	ق	ك	ل	م	ن	ه	و	ى	ي	ً	ٌ	ٍ	َ	ُ
U+065x	ِ	ّ	ْ	ٓ	ٔ	ٕ	ٖ	ٗ	٘	ٙ	ٚ	ٛ	ٜ	ٝ	ٞ	ٟ
U+066x	٠	١	٢	٣	٤	٥	٦	٧	٨	٩	٪	٫	٬	٭	ٮ	ٯ
U+067x	ٰ	ٱ	ٲ	ٳ	ٴ	ٵ	ٶ	ٷ	ٸ	ٹ	ٺ	ٻ	ټ	ٽ	پ	ٿ
U+068x	ڀ	ځ	ڂ	ڃ	ڄ	څ	چ	ڇ	ڈ	ډ	ڊ	ڋ	ڌ	ڍ	ڎ	ڏ
U+069x	ڐ	ڑ	ڒ	ړ	ڔ	ڕ	ږ	ڗ	ژ	ڙ	ښ	ڛ	ڜ	ڝ	ڞ	ڟ
U+06Ax	ڠ	ڡ	ڢ	ڣ	ڤ	ڥ	ڦ	ڧ	ڨ	ک	ڪ	ګ	ڬ	ڭ	ڮ	گ
U+06Bx	ڰ	ڱ	ڲ	ڳ	ڴ	ڵ	ڶ	ڷ	ڸ	ڹ	ں	ڻ	ڼ	ڽ	ھ	ڿ
U+06Cx	ۀ	ہ	ۂ	ۃ	ۄ	ۅ	ۆ	ۇ	ۈ	ۉ	ۊ	ۋ	ی	ۍ	ێ	ۏ
U+06Dx	ې	ۑ	ے	ۓ	۔	ە	ۖ	ۗ	ۘ	ۙ	ۚ	ۛ	ۜ	۝	۞	۟
U+06Ex	۠	ۡ	ۢ	ۣ	ۤ	ۥ	ۦ	ۧ	ۨ	۩	۪	۫۫	۬	ۭ	ۮ	ۯ
U+06Fx	۰	۱	۲	۳	۴	۵	۶	۷	۸	۹	ۺ	ۻ	ۼ	۽	۾	ۿ
Notes 1.As of Unicode version 18.0 2.Unicode code point U+0673 is deprecated as of Unicode version 6.0

=== Arabic Supplement ===
Arabic Supplement^{[1]} Official Unicode Consortium code chart (PDF)
	0	1	2	3	4	5	6	7	8	9	A	B	C	D	E	F
U+075x	ݐ	ݑ	ݒ	ݓ	ݔ	ݕ	ݖ	ݗ	ݘ	ݙ	ݚ	ݛ	ݜ	ݝ	ݞ	ݟ
U+076x	ݠ	ݡ	ݢ	ݣ	ݤ	ݥ	ݦ	ݧ	ݨ	ݩ	ݪ	ݫ	ݬ	ݭ	ݮ	ݯ
U+077x	ݰ	ݱ	ݲ	ݳ	ݴ	ݵ	ݶ	ݷ	ݸ	ݹ	ݺ	ݻ	ݼ	ݽ	ݾ	ݿ
Notes 1.As of Unicode version 18.0

=== Arabic Extended-B ===
Arabic Extended-B^{[1]}^{[2]} Official Unicode Consortium code chart (PDF)
	0	1	2	3	4	5	6	7	8	9	A	B	C	D	E	F
U+087x	ࡰ	ࡱ	ࡲ	ࡳ	ࡴ	ࡵ	ࡶ	ࡷ	ࡸ	ࡹ	ࡺ	ࡻ	ࡼ	ࡽ	ࡾ	ࡿ
U+088x	ࢀ	ࢁ	ࢂ	ࢃ	ࢄ	ࢅ	ࢆ	ࢇ	࢈	ࢉ	ࢊ	ࢋ	ࢌ	ࢍ	ࢎ	࢏
U+089x	࢐	࢑						ࢗ	࢘	࢙	࢚	࢛	࢜	࢝	࢞	࢟
Notes 1.As of Unicode version 18.0 2.Grey areas indicate non-assigned code points

=== Arabic Extended-A ===
Arabic Extended-A^{[1]} Official Unicode Consortium code chart (PDF)
	0	1	2	3	4	5	6	7	8	9	A	B	C	D	E	F
U+08Ax	ࢠ	ࢡ	ࢢ	ࢣ	ࢤ	ࢥ	ࢦ	ࢧ	ࢨ	ࢩ	ࢪ	ࢫ	ࢬ	ࢭ	ࢮ	ࢯ
U+08Bx	ࢰ	ࢱ	ࢲ	ࢳ	ࢴ	ࢵ	ࢶ	ࢷ	ࢸ	ࢹ	ࢺ	ࢻ	ࢼ	ࢽ	ࢾ	ࢿ
U+08Cx	ࣀ	ࣁ	ࣂ	ࣃ	ࣄ	ࣅ	ࣆ	ࣇ	ࣈ	ࣉ	࣊	࣋	࣌	࣍	࣎	࣏
U+08Dx	࣐	࣑	࣒	࣓	ࣔ	ࣕ	ࣖ	ࣗ	ࣘ	ࣙ	ࣚ	ࣛ	ࣜ	ࣝ	ࣞ	ࣟ
U+08Ex	࣠	࣡	࣢	ࣣ	ࣤ	ࣥ	ࣦ	ࣧ	ࣨ	ࣩ	࣪	࣫	࣬	࣭	࣮	࣯
U+08Fx	ࣰ	ࣱ	ࣲ	ࣳ	ࣴ	ࣵ	ࣶ	ࣷ	ࣸ	ࣹ	ࣺ	ࣻ	ࣼ	ࣽ	ࣾ	ࣿ
Notes 1.As of Unicode version 18.0

=== Arabic Presentation Forms-A ===
They are mostly ligatures which can be created from the previous charts' characters, with the exception of the bracket-like graphemes ﴾ ﴿ and some of them are ligatures of common liturgical phrases.

Arabic Presentation Forms-A^{[1]}^{[2]} Official Unicode Consortium code chart (PDF)
	0	1	2	3	4	5	6	7	8	9	A	B	C	D	E	F
U+FB5x	ﭐ	ﭑ	ﭒ	ﭓ	ﭔ	ﭕ	ﭖ	ﭗ	ﭘ	ﭙ	ﭚ	ﭛ	ﭜ	ﭝ	ﭞ	ﭟ
U+FB6x	ﭠ	ﭡ	ﭢ	ﭣ	ﭤ	ﭥ	ﭦ	ﭧ	ﭨ	ﭩ	ﭪ	ﭫ	ﭬ	ﭭ	ﭮ	ﭯ
U+FB7x	ﭰ	ﭱ	ﭲ	ﭳ	ﭴ	ﭵ	ﭶ	ﭷ	ﭸ	ﭹ	ﭺ	ﭻ	ﭼ	ﭽ	ﭾ	ﭿ
U+FB8x	ﮀ	ﮁ	ﮂ	ﮃ	ﮄ	ﮅ	ﮆ	ﮇ	ﮈ	ﮉ	ﮊ	ﮋ	ﮌ	ﮍ	ﮎ	ﮏ
U+FB9x	ﮐ	ﮑ	ﮒ	ﮓ	ﮔ	ﮕ	ﮖ	ﮗ	ﮘ	ﮙ	ﮚ	ﮛ	ﮜ	ﮝ	ﮞ	ﮟ
U+FBAx	ﮠ	ﮡ	ﮢ	ﮣ	ﮤ	ﮥ	ﮦ	ﮧ	ﮨ	ﮩ	ﮪ	ﮫ	ﮬ	ﮭ	ﮮ	ﮯ
U+FBBx	ﮰ	ﮱ	﮲	﮳	﮴	﮵	﮶	﮷	﮸	﮹	﮺	﮻	﮼	﮽	﮾	﮿
U+FBCx	﯀	﯁	﯂	﯃	﯄	﯅	﯆	﯇	﯈	﯉	﯊	﯋	﯌	﯍	﯎	﯏
U+FBDx	﯐	﯑	﯒	ﯓ	ﯔ	ﯕ	ﯖ	ﯗ	ﯘ	ﯙ	ﯚ	ﯛ	ﯜ	ﯝ	ﯞ	ﯟ
U+FBEx	ﯠ	ﯡ	ﯢ	ﯣ	ﯤ	ﯥ	ﯦ	ﯧ	ﯨ	ﯩ	ﯪ	ﯫ	ﯬ	ﯭ	ﯮ	ﯯ
U+FBFx	ﯰ	ﯱ	ﯲ	ﯳ	ﯴ	ﯵ	ﯶ	ﯷ	ﯸ	ﯹ	ﯺ	ﯻ	ﯼ	ﯽ	ﯾ	ﯿ
U+FC0x	ﰀ	ﰁ	ﰂ	ﰃ	ﰄ	ﰅ	ﰆ	ﰇ	ﰈ	ﰉ	ﰊ	ﰋ	ﰌ	ﰍ	ﰎ	ﰏ
U+FC1x	ﰐ	ﰑ	ﰒ	ﰓ	ﰔ	ﰕ	ﰖ	ﰗ	ﰘ	ﰙ	ﰚ	ﰛ	ﰜ	ﰝ	ﰞ	ﰟ
U+FC2x	ﰠ	ﰡ	ﰢ	ﰣ	ﰤ	ﰥ	ﰦ	ﰧ	ﰨ	ﰩ	ﰪ	ﰫ	ﰬ	ﰭ	ﰮ	ﰯ
U+FC3x	ﰰ	ﰱ	ﰲ	ﰳ	ﰴ	ﰵ	ﰶ	ﰷ	ﰸ	ﰹ	ﰺ	ﰻ	ﰼ	ﰽ	ﰾ	ﰿ
U+FC4x	ﱀ	ﱁ	ﱂ	ﱃ	ﱄ	ﱅ	ﱆ	ﱇ	ﱈ	ﱉ	ﱊ	ﱋ	ﱌ	ﱍ	ﱎ	ﱏ
U+FC5x	ﱐ	ﱑ	ﱒ	ﱓ	ﱔ	ﱕ	ﱖ	ﱗ	ﱘ	ﱙ	ﱚ	ﱛ	ﱜ	ﱝ	ﱞ	ﱟ
U+FC6x	ﱠ	ﱡ	ﱢ	ﱣ	ﱤ	ﱥ	ﱦ	ﱧ	ﱨ	ﱩ	ﱪ	ﱫ	ﱬ	ﱭ	ﱮ	ﱯ
U+FC7x	ﱰ	ﱱ	ﱲ	ﱳ	ﱴ	ﱵ	ﱶ	ﱷ	ﱸ	ﱹ	ﱺ	ﱻ	ﱼ	ﱽ	ﱾ	ﱿ
U+FC8x	ﲀ	ﲁ	ﲂ	ﲃ	ﲄ	ﲅ	ﲆ	ﲇ	ﲈ	ﲉ	ﲊ	ﲋ	ﲌ	ﲍ	ﲎ	ﲏ
U+FC9x	ﲐ	ﲑ	ﲒ	ﲓ	ﲔ	ﲕ	ﲖ	ﲗ	ﲘ	ﲙ	ﲚ	ﲛ	ﲜ	ﲝ	ﲞ	ﲟ
U+FCAx	ﲠ	ﲡ	ﲢ	ﲣ	ﲤ	ﲥ	ﲦ	ﲧ	ﲨ	ﲩ	ﲪ	ﲫ	ﲬ	ﲭ	ﲮ	ﲯ
U+FCBx	ﲰ	ﲱ	ﲲ	ﲳ	ﲴ	ﲵ	ﲶ	ﲷ	ﲸ	ﲹ	ﲺ	ﲻ	ﲼ	ﲽ	ﲾ	ﲿ
U+FCCx	ﳀ	ﳁ	ﳂ	ﳃ	ﳄ	ﳅ	ﳆ	ﳇ	ﳈ	ﳉ	ﳊ	ﳋ	ﳌ	ﳍ	ﳎ	ﳏ
U+FCDx	ﳐ	ﳑ	ﳒ	ﳓ	ﳔ	ﳕ	ﳖ	ﳗ	ﳘ	ﳙ	ﳚ	ﳛ	ﳜ	ﳝ	ﳞ	ﳟ
U+FCEx	ﳠ	ﳡ	ﳢ	ﳣ	ﳤ	ﳥ	ﳦ	ﳧ	ﳨ	ﳩ	ﳪ	ﳫ	ﳬ	ﳭ	ﳮ	ﳯ
U+FCFx	ﳰ	ﳱ	ﳲ	ﳳ	ﳴ	ﳵ	ﳶ	ﳷ	ﳸ	ﳹ	ﳺ	ﳻ	ﳼ	ﳽ	ﳾ	ﳿ
U+FD0x	ﴀ	ﴁ	ﴂ	ﴃ	ﴄ	ﴅ	ﴆ	ﴇ	ﴈ	ﴉ	ﴊ	ﴋ	ﴌ	ﴍ	ﴎ	ﴏ
U+FD1x	ﴐ	ﴑ	ﴒ	ﴓ	ﴔ	ﴕ	ﴖ	ﴗ	ﴘ	ﴙ	ﴚ	ﴛ	ﴜ	ﴝ	ﴞ	ﴟ
U+FD2x	ﴠ	ﴡ	ﴢ	ﴣ	ﴤ	ﴥ	ﴦ	ﴧ	ﴨ	ﴩ	ﴪ	ﴫ	ﴬ	ﴭ	ﴮ	ﴯ
U+FD3x	ﴰ	ﴱ	ﴲ	ﴳ	ﴴ	ﴵ	ﴶ	ﴷ	ﴸ	ﴹ	ﴺ	ﴻ	ﴼ	ﴽ	﴾	﴿
U+FD4x	﵀	﵁	﵂	﵃	﵄	﵅	﵆	﵇	﵈	﵉	﵊	﵋	﵌	﵍	﵎	﵏
U+FD5x	ﵐ	ﵑ	ﵒ	ﵓ	ﵔ	ﵕ	ﵖ	ﵗ	ﵘ	ﵙ	ﵚ	ﵛ	ﵜ	ﵝ	ﵞ	ﵟ
U+FD6x	ﵠ	ﵡ	ﵢ	ﵣ	ﵤ	ﵥ	ﵦ	ﵧ	ﵨ	ﵩ	ﵪ	ﵫ	ﵬ	ﵭ	ﵮ	ﵯ
U+FD7x	ﵰ	ﵱ	ﵲ	ﵳ	ﵴ	ﵵ	ﵶ	ﵷ	ﵸ	ﵹ	ﵺ	ﵻ	ﵼ	ﵽ	ﵾ	ﵿ
U+FD8x	ﶀ	ﶁ	ﶂ	ﶃ	ﶄ	ﶅ	ﶆ	ﶇ	ﶈ	ﶉ	ﶊ	ﶋ	ﶌ	ﶍ	ﶎ	ﶏ
U+FD9x	﶐	﶑	ﶒ	ﶓ	ﶔ	ﶕ	ﶖ	ﶗ	ﶘ	ﶙ	ﶚ	ﶛ	ﶜ	ﶝ	ﶞ	ﶟ
U+FDAx	ﶠ	ﶡ	ﶢ	ﶣ	ﶤ	ﶥ	ﶦ	ﶧ	ﶨ	ﶩ	ﶪ	ﶫ	ﶬ	ﶭ	ﶮ	ﶯ
U+FDBx	ﶰ	ﶱ	ﶲ	ﶳ	ﶴ	ﶵ	ﶶ	ﶷ	ﶸ	ﶹ	ﶺ	ﶻ	ﶼ	ﶽ	ﶾ	ﶿ
U+FDCx	ﷀ	ﷁ	ﷂ	ﷃ	ﷄ	ﷅ	ﷆ	ﷇ	﷈	﷉	﷊	﷋	﷌	﷍	﷎	﷏
U+FDDx																
U+FDEx																
U+FDFx	ﷰ	ﷱ	ﷲ	ﷳ	ﷴ	ﷵ	ﷶ	ﷷ	ﷸ	ﷹ	ﷺ	ﷻ	﷼	﷽	﷾	﷿
Notes 1.As of Unicode version 18.0 2.Black areas indicate noncharacters (code points that are guaranteed never to be assigned as encoded characters in the Unicode Standard)

=== Arabic Presentation Forms-B ===
These can all be created from the basic chart's characters.

Arabic Presentation Forms-B^{[1]}^{[2]} Official Unicode Consortium code chart (PDF)
	0	1	2	3	4	5	6	7	8	9	A	B	C	D	E	F
U+FE7x	ﹰ	ﹱ	ﹲ	ﹳ	ﹴ		ﹶ	ﹷ	ﹸ	ﹹ	ﹺ	ﹻ	ﹼ	ﹽ	ﹾ	ﹿ
U+FE8x	ﺀ	ﺁ	ﺂ	ﺃ	ﺄ	ﺅ	ﺆ	ﺇ	ﺈ	ﺉ	ﺊ	ﺋ	ﺌ	ﺍ	ﺎ	ﺏ
U+FE9x	ﺐ	ﺑ	ﺒ	ﺓ	ﺔ	ﺕ	ﺖ	ﺗ	ﺘ	ﺙ	ﺚ	ﺛ	ﺜ	ﺝ	ﺞ	ﺟ
U+FEAx	ﺠ	ﺡ	ﺢ	ﺣ	ﺤ	ﺥ	ﺦ	ﺧ	ﺨ	ﺩ	ﺪ	ﺫ	ﺬ	ﺭ	ﺮ	ﺯ
U+FEBx	ﺰ	ﺱ	ﺲ	ﺳ	ﺴ	ﺵ	ﺶ	ﺷ	ﺸ	ﺹ	ﺺ	ﺻ	ﺼ	ﺽ	ﺾ	ﺿ
U+FECx	ﻀ	ﻁ	ﻂ	ﻃ	ﻄ	ﻅ	ﻆ	ﻇ	ﻈ	ﻉ	ﻊ	ﻋ	ﻌ	ﻍ	ﻎ	ﻏ
U+FEDx	ﻐ	ﻑ	ﻒ	ﻓ	ﻔ	ﻕ	ﻖ	ﻗ	ﻘ	ﻙ	ﻚ	ﻛ	ﻜ	ﻝ	ﻞ	ﻟ
U+FEEx	ﻠ	ﻡ	ﻢ	ﻣ	ﻤ	ﻥ	ﻦ	ﻧ	ﻨ	ﻩ	ﻪ	ﻫ	ﻬ	ﻭ	ﻮ	ﻯ
U+FEFx	ﻰ	ﻱ	ﻲ	ﻳ	ﻴ	ﻵ	ﻶ	ﻷ	ﻸ	ﻹ	ﻺ	ﻻ	ﻼ			ZW; NBSP
Notes 1.As of Unicode version 18.0 2.Grey areas indicate non-assigned code points

=== Rumi Numeral Symbols ===
Rumi Numeral Symbols^{[1]}^{[2]} Official Unicode Consortium code chart (PDF)
	0	1	2	3	4	5	6	7	8	9	A	B	C	D	E	F
U+10E6x	𐹠	𐹡	𐹢	𐹣	𐹤	𐹥	𐹦	𐹧	𐹨	𐹩	𐹪	𐹫	𐹬	𐹭	𐹮	𐹯
U+10E7x	𐹰	𐹱	𐹲	𐹳	𐹴	𐹵	𐹶	𐹷	𐹸	𐹹	𐹺	𐹻	𐹼	𐹽	𐹾	
Notes 1.As of Unicode version 18.0 2.Grey area indicates non-assigned code point

=== Arabic Extended-C ===
Arabic Extended-C^{[1]}^{[2]} Official Unicode Consortium code chart (PDF)
	0	1	2	3	4	5	6	7	8	9	A	B	C	D	E	F
U+10ECx			𐻂	𐻃	𐻄	𐻅	𐻆	𐻇		𐻉	𐻊	𐻋	𐻌	𐻍	𐻎	𐻏
U+10EDx	𐻐	𐻑	𐻒	𐻓	𐻔	𐻕	𐻖	𐻗	𐻘	𐻙	𐻚	𐻛	𐻜	𐻝	𐻞	𐻟
U+10EEx	𐻠	𐻡	𐻢	𐻣	𐻤	𐻥	𐻦	𐻧	𐻨	𐻩	𐻪	𐻫	𐻬	𐻭	𐻮	
U+10EFx	𐻰	𐻱	𐻲	𐻳	𐻴	𐻵	𐻶	𐻷	𐻸	𐻹	𐻺	𐻻	𐻼	𐻽	𐻾	𐻿
Notes 1.As of Unicode version 18.0 2.Grey areas indicate non-assigned code points

=== Indic Siyaq Numbers ===
Indic Siyaq Numbers^{[1]}^{[2]} Official Unicode Consortium code chart (PDF)
	0	1	2	3	4	5	6	7	8	9	A	B	C	D	E	F
U+1EC7x		𞱱	𞱲	𞱳	𞱴	𞱵	𞱶	𞱷	𞱸	𞱹	𞱺	𞱻	𞱼	𞱽	𞱾	𞱿
U+1EC8x	𞲀	𞲁	𞲂	𞲃	𞲄	𞲅	𞲆	𞲇	𞲈	𞲉	𞲊	𞲋	𞲌	𞲍	𞲎	𞲏
U+1EC9x	𞲐	𞲑	𞲒	𞲓	𞲔	𞲕	𞲖	𞲗	𞲘	𞲙	𞲚	𞲛	𞲜	𞲝	𞲞	𞲟
U+1ECAx	𞲠	𞲡	𞲢	𞲣	𞲤	𞲥	𞲦	𞲧	𞲨	𞲩	𞲪	𞲫	𞲬	𞲭	𞲮	𞲯
U+1ECBx	𞲰	𞲱	𞲲	𞲳	𞲴											
Notes 1.As of Unicode version 18.0 2.Grey areas indicate non-assigned code points

=== Ottoman Siyaq Numbers ===
Ottoman Siyaq Numbers^{[1]}^{[2]} Official Unicode Consortium code chart (PDF)
	0	1	2	3	4	5	6	7	8	9	A	B	C	D	E	F
U+1ED0x		𞴁	𞴂	𞴃	𞴄	𞴅	𞴆	𞴇	𞴈	𞴉	𞴊	𞴋	𞴌	𞴍	𞴎	𞴏
U+1ED1x	𞴐	𞴑	𞴒	𞴓	𞴔	𞴕	𞴖	𞴗	𞴘	𞴙	𞴚	𞴛	𞴜	𞴝	𞴞	𞴟
U+1ED2x	𞴠	𞴡	𞴢	𞴣	𞴤	𞴥	𞴦	𞴧	𞴨	𞴩	𞴪	𞴫	𞴬	𞴭	𞴮	𞴯
U+1ED3x	𞴰	𞴱	𞴲	𞴳	𞴴	𞴵	𞴶	𞴷	𞴸	𞴹	𞴺	𞴻	𞴼	𞴽		
U+1ED4x																
Notes 1.As of Unicode version 18.0 2.Grey areas indicate non-assigned code points

=== Arabic Mathematical Alphabetic Symbols ===
Arabic Mathematical Alphabetic Symbols^{[1]}^{[2]} Official Unicode Consortium code chart (PDF)
	0	1	2	3	4	5	6	7	8	9	A	B	C	D	E	F
U+1EE0x	𞸀	𞸁	𞸂	𞸃		𞸅	𞸆	𞸇	𞸈	𞸉	𞸊	𞸋	𞸌	𞸍	𞸎	𞸏
U+1EE1x	𞸐	𞸑	𞸒	𞸓	𞸔	𞸕	𞸖	𞸗	𞸘	𞸙	𞸚	𞸛	𞸜	𞸝	𞸞	𞸟
U+1EE2x		𞸡	𞸢		𞸤			𞸧		𞸩	𞸪	𞸫	𞸬	𞸭	𞸮	𞸯
U+1EE3x	𞸰	𞸱	𞸲		𞸴	𞸵	𞸶	𞸷		𞸹		𞸻				
U+1EE4x			𞹂					𞹇		𞹉		𞹋		𞹍	𞹎	𞹏
U+1EE5x		𞹑	𞹒		𞹔			𞹗		𞹙		𞹛		𞹝		𞹟
U+1EE6x		𞹡	𞹢		𞹤			𞹧	𞹨	𞹩	𞹪		𞹬	𞹭	𞹮	𞹯
U+1EE7x	𞹰	𞹱	𞹲		𞹴	𞹵	𞹶	𞹷		𞹹	𞹺	𞹻	𞹼		𞹾	
U+1EE8x	𞺀	𞺁	𞺂	𞺃	𞺄	𞺅	𞺆	𞺇	𞺈	𞺉		𞺋	𞺌	𞺍	𞺎	𞺏
U+1EE9x	𞺐	𞺑	𞺒	𞺓	𞺔	𞺕	𞺖	𞺗	𞺘	𞺙	𞺚	𞺛				
U+1EEAx		𞺡	𞺢	𞺣		𞺥	𞺦	𞺧	𞺨	𞺩		𞺫	𞺬	𞺭	𞺮	𞺯
U+1EEBx	𞺰	𞺱	𞺲	𞺳	𞺴	𞺵	𞺶	𞺷	𞺸	𞺹	𞺺	𞺻				
U+1EECx																
U+1EEDx																
U+1EEEx																
U+1EEFx	𞻰	𞻱														
Notes 1.As of Unicode version 18.0 2.Grey areas indicate non-assigned code points
