= Ng (Arabic letter) =

- ڭ ݣ

Usage
- Writing system: Arabic script
- Type: Abjad
- Language of origin: Uyghur, Ottoman Turkish, Tatar
- Sound values: [ŋ], [g] (in Moroccan Arabic)
- In Unicode: U+0763, U+06AD

History
Development
D46
        - ک ك
          - ڭ ݣ
- Sisters: ګ; ڬ; ڮ; گ; ݢ; ࢴ

Other
- Writing direction: Right-to-left

Ng or Ngaf (ݣ or ڭ) is an additional letter of the Arabic script, derived from kāf (ك ک) with the addition of three dots above the letter. The letter was used in Ottoman Turkish to represent a velar /ŋ/ and is still used for it when writing Turkic languages.

Position in word:	Isolated	Final	Medial	Initial
Naskh glyph form: (Help)	ݣ	ـݣ	ـݣـ	ݣـ
Nastaliq glyph form:	ݣ	ــــݣ	ــــݣــــ	ݣــــ

Position in word:	Isolated	Final	Medial	Initial
Naskh glyph form: (Help)	ڭ	ـڭ	ـڭـ	ڭـ
Nastaliq glyph form:	ڭ	ــــڭ	ــــڭــــ	ڭــــ

== Usage ==
In Ottoman Turkish, it represented the velar /ŋ/. An example is the word däŋiz (دڭز, 'sea'). The letter is used or has been used to write /ŋ/ in:

- Chagatai
- Kazakh
- Kyrgyz
- Azerbaijani
- Uyghur

It is also used in Moroccan Arabic for /ɡ/.

The Xiao'erjing script variant ݣ is used to spell /ŋ/ in Sinitic languages such as Mandarin (especially the Lanyin, Zhongyuan and Northeastern dialects) and the Dungan language.

== Other characters used to represent /ŋ/ ==
=== Southeast Asian nga ===
Position in word:	Isolated	Final	Medial	Initial
Glyph form: (Help)	ڠ	ـڠ	ـڠـ	ڠـ

This letter, derived from ghayn (غ), is used to represent /ŋ/ in:

- the Jawi script, for
  - Acehnese
  - Banjarese
  - Kerinci
  - Maguindanaon
  - Malay
  - Minangkabau
  - Tausūg
  - Ternate
- the Pegon script, for
  - Javanese
  - Sundanese
- Arabic Afrikaans, for Afrikaans historically, called ngīn ([ŋiːn])

=== Wolof ngōn ===
Position in word:	Isolated	Final	Medial	Initial
Glyph form: (Help)	ݝ	ـݝ	ـݝـ	ݝـ

This letter is also derived from ghayn. Called ngōn (Wolof pronunciation: [ŋɔːn]), it is used in the Wolofal alphabet to represent /ŋ/ in the Wolof language. Two variants of kāf were also used: ڭ as in Turkic, and ݤ below.

Position in word:	Isolated	Final	Medial	Initial
Glyph form: (Help)	ݤ	ـݤ	ـݤـ	ݤـ

=== Sindhi ngāf ===
Position in word:	Isolated	Final	Medial	Initial
Glyph form: (Help)	ڱ	ـڱ	ـڱـ	ڱـ

Derived from the Perso-Arabic gāf (گ) and called ngāf [ŋäːf], is used in Sindhi for /ŋ/ when written in the Arabic script.

=== Tamil nga ===
Position in word:	Isolated	Final	Medial	Initial
Glyph form: (Help)	ࢳ	ـࢳ	ـࢳـ	ࢳـ

This letter is also derived from ghayn, with three dots inside the descender, to represent /ŋ/ in the Arwi script used for Tamil.

== See also ==
- Kāf
- Ghayn
- Gaf
- Ayin
- Gueh, used in Sindhi and Saraiki
