= Ottoman Siyaq Numbers =

- Range: U+1ED00..U+1ED4F (80 code points)
- Plane: SMP
- Scripts: Common
- Assigned: 61 code points
- Unused: 19 reserved code points

Unicode version history
- 12.0 (2019): 61 (+61)

Unicode documentation
- Code chart ∣ Web page

Ottoman Siyaq Numbers is a Unicode block containing a specialized subset of the Arabic script that was used for accounting in Ottoman Turkish documents.

== Block ==
Ottoman Siyaq Numbers^{[1]}^{[2]} Official Unicode Consortium code chart (PDF)
	0	1	2	3	4	5	6	7	8	9	A	B	C	D	E	F
U+1ED0x		𞴁	𞴂	𞴃	𞴄	𞴅	𞴆	𞴇	𞴈	𞴉	𞴊	𞴋	𞴌	𞴍	𞴎	𞴏
U+1ED1x	𞴐	𞴑	𞴒	𞴓	𞴔	𞴕	𞴖	𞴗	𞴘	𞴙	𞴚	𞴛	𞴜	𞴝	𞴞	𞴟
U+1ED2x	𞴠	𞴡	𞴢	𞴣	𞴤	𞴥	𞴦	𞴧	𞴨	𞴩	𞴪	𞴫	𞴬	𞴭	𞴮	𞴯
U+1ED3x	𞴰	𞴱	𞴲	𞴳	𞴴	𞴵	𞴶	𞴷	𞴸	𞴹	𞴺	𞴻	𞴼	𞴽		
U+1ED4x																
Notes 1.As of Unicode version 17.0 2.Grey areas indicate non-assigned code points

== History ==
The following Unicode-related documents record the purpose and process of defining specific characters in the Ottoman Siyaq Numbers block:

Version	Final code points (Note: Proposed code points and characters names may differ from final code points and names)	Count	L2 ID	WG2 ID	Document
12.0	U+1ED01..1ED3D	61	L2/07-414		Pandey, Anshuman (2007-12-04), Proposal to Encode Siyaq Numerals
12.0	U+1ED01..1ED3D	61	L2/09-166	N4118	Pandey, Anshuman (2009-05-02), A Model for Encoding Numerals of the Ottoman Siyaq System
12.0	U+1ED01..1ED3D	61	L2/11-271	N4124	Pandey, Anshuman (2011-07-13), Preliminary Proposal to Encode Ottoman Siyaq Numbers
12.0	U+1ED01..1ED3D	61	L2/15-149		Anderson, Deborah; Whistler, Ken; McGowan, Rick; Pournader, Roozbeh; Pandey, Anshuman; Glass, Andrew (2015-05-03), "17. Ottoman Siyaq Numbers", Recommendations to UTC #143 May 2015 on Script Proposals
12.0	U+1ED01..1ED3D	61	L2/15-312		Anderson, Deborah; Whistler, Ken; McGowan, Rick; Pournader, Roozbeh; Glass, Andrew; Iancu, Laurențiu (2015-11-01), "11. Siyaq", Recommendations to UTC #145 November 2015 on Script Proposals
12.0	U+1ED01..1ED3D	61	L2/15-072		Pandey, Anshuman (2015-12-11), Proposal to Encode Ottoman Siyaq Numbers
12.0	U+1ED01..1ED3D	61	L2/17-255		Anderson, Deborah; Whistler, Ken; Pournader, Roozbeh; Moore, Lisa; Liang, Hai (2017-07-28), "1.Ottoman Siyaq", Recommendations to UTC #152 July-August 2017 on Script Proposals
12.0	U+1ED01..1ED3D	61	L2/17-348	N4917	Pandey, Anshuman (2017-09-29), Proposal to encode Ottoman Siyaq Numbers
12.0	U+1ED01..1ED3D	61	L2/17-384		Anderson, Deborah; Whistler, Ken; Pournader, Roozbeh; Moore, Lisa; Liang, Hai (2017-10-22), "12. Ottoman Siyaq", Recommendations to UTC #153 October 2017 on Script Proposals
12.0	U+1ED01..1ED3D	61	L2/17-362		Moore, Lisa (2018-02-02), "Consensus 153-C30", UTC #153 Minutes
