= Hā with hamza above =

Fortieth letter of Pashto alphabet

- ۀ

Usage
- Writing system: Arabic script
- Type: Abjad
- Language of origin: Iranian languages
- Sound values: Pashto: [ə] Persian: [eje]
- In Unicode: U+06C0 ۀ ARABIC LETTER HEH WITH YEH ABOVE U+06C2 ۂ ARABIC LETTER HEH GOAL WITH HAMZA ABOVE

Other
- Writing direction: Right-to-left

ۀ is a letter of the Pashto and Persian languages consisting of hāʾ with a hamza above.

== Usage ==
In the Pashto alphabet, it is the fortieth letter, known as Kajira He, where it represents the vowel /ə/ and is transliterated ⟨ë⟩.

In Persian, it is not considered a distinct letter of the alphabet but is used when marking ezafe on a word ending in ـه ⟨…e⟩ [e], thus yielding ـهٔ ⟨…e-ye⟩ [eje]. According to one source, this is not actually a hamza but rather a development of the letter ی ye as a diacritic.

In both written Pashto and Persian, it only appears in the final position:

Position in word	Isolated	Final	Medial	Initial
Glyph form: (Help)	ۀ	ـۀ	ـۀ	ۀ
