= Arabic Extended-B =

- Range: U+0870..U+089F (48 code points)
- Plane: BMP
- Scripts: Arabic
- Major alphabets: Bosnian; Javanese; Sorabe; Sundanese
- Assigned: 43 code points
- Unused: 5 reserved code points

Unicode version history
- 14.0 (2021): 41 (+41)
- 16.0 (2024): 42 (+1)
- 17.0 (2025): 43 (+1)

Unicode documentation
- Code chart ∣ Web page

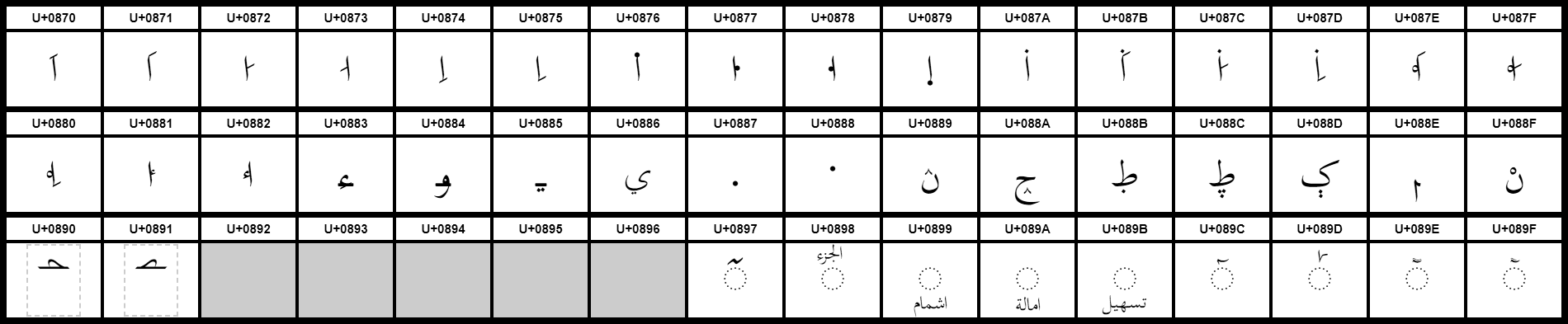
Graphical representation of the Arabic Extended-B Unicode block

Arabic Extended-B is a Unicode block encoding Qur'anic annotations and letter variants used for various non-Arabic languages. The block also includes currency symbols and an abbreviation mark.

== Block ==
Arabic Extended-B^{[1]}^{[2]} Official Unicode Consortium code chart (PDF)
	0	1	2	3	4	5	6	7	8	9	A	B	C	D	E	F
U+087x	ࡰ	ࡱ	ࡲ	ࡳ	ࡴ	ࡵ	ࡶ	ࡷ	ࡸ	ࡹ	ࡺ	ࡻ	ࡼ	ࡽ	ࡾ	ࡿ
U+088x	ࢀ	ࢁ	ࢂ	ࢃ	ࢄ	ࢅ	ࢆ	ࢇ	࢈	ࢉ	ࢊ	ࢋ	ࢌ	ࢍ	ࢎ	࢏
U+089x	࢐	࢑						ࢗ	࢘	࢙	࢚	࢛	࢜	࢝	࢞	࢟
Notes: 1. As of Unicode version 17.0; 2. Grey areas indicate non-assigned code points

== History ==
The following Unicode-related documents record the purpose and process of defining specific characters in the Arabic Extended-B block:

Version	Final code points (Note: Proposed code points and characters names may differ from final code points and names)	Count	L2 ID	WG2 ID	Document
14.0	U+0870..0888, 089D..089F	28	L2/19-306	N5142	Pournader, Roozbeh; Anderson, Deborah (2019-09-29), Arabic additions for Quranic orthographies
14.0	U+0870..0888, 089D..089F	28	L2/19-343		Anderson, Deborah; Whistler, Ken; Pournader, Roozbeh; Moore, Lisa; Liang, Hai (2019-10-06), "a. Additions for Quranic orthographies", Recommendations to UTC #161 October 2019 on Script Proposals
14.0	U+0870..0888, 089D..089F	28	L2/19-323		Moore, Lisa (2019-10-01), "Consensus 161-C4", UTC #161 Minutes
14.0	U+0870..0888, 089D..089F	28	L2/20-105		Anderson, Deborah; Whistler, Ken; Pournader, Roozbeh; Moore, Lisa; Constable, Peter; Liang, Hai (2020-04-20), "3f. Comments on L2/19-306", Recommendations to UTC #163 April 2020 on Script Proposals
14.0	U+0889..088A	2	L2/19-339		Jacquerye, Denis Moyogo (2019-10-03), Proposal to encode Bosnian Arabic characters
14.0	U+0889..088A	2	L2/19-343		Anderson, Deborah; Whistler, Ken; Pournader, Roozbeh; Moore, Lisa; Liang, Hai (2019-10-06), "d. Bosnian Arabic characters", Recommendations to UTC #161 October 2019 on Script Proposals
14.0	U+0889..088A	2	L2/19-323		Moore, Lisa (2019-10-01), "C.6.5", UTC #161 Minutes
14.0	U+088B..088D	3	L2/19-340		Jacquerye, Denis Moyogo (2019-10-03), Proposal to encode Javanese and Sundanese Arabic characters
14.0	U+088B..088D	3	L2/19-323		Moore, Lisa (2019-10-01), "C.6.6", UTC #161 Minutes
14.0	U+088E	1	L2/20-071R		Pournader, Roozbeh; Izadpanah, Borna (2020-05-01), Proposal to encode an Arabic tail character used for abbreviation
14.0	U+088E	1	L2/20-105		Anderson, Deborah; Whistler, Ken; Pournader, Roozbeh; Moore, Lisa; Constable, Peter; Liang, Hai (2020-04-20), "3b. Arabic Tail Character", Recommendations to UTC #163 April 2020 on Script Proposals
14.0	U+088E	1	L2/20-102		Moore, Lisa (2020-05-06), "Consensus 163-C26", UTC #163 Minutes
14.0	U+0890..0891	2	L2/20-245		Hosny, Khaled; Pournader, Roozbeh (2020-09-09), Proposal to encode three Arabic symbols
14.0	U+0890..0891	2	L2/20-250		Anderson, Deborah; Whistler, Ken; Pournader, Roozbeh; Moore, Lisa; Constable, Peter; Liang, Hai (2020-10-01), "5a. Three Symbols", Recommendations to UTC #165 October 2020 on Script Proposals
14.0	U+0890..0891	2	L2/20-237		Moore, Lisa (2020-10-27), "Consensus 165-C15", UTC #165 Minutes
14.0	U+0898..089C	5	L2/20-089		Syarifuddin, M. Mahali (2020-02-28), Proposal to Encode Characters from Indonesian Orthography of Quran
14.0	U+0898..089C	5	L2/20-105		Anderson, Deborah; Whistler, Ken; Pournader, Roozbeh; Moore, Lisa; Constable, Peter; Liang, Hai (2020-04-20), "3c. Indonesian Orthography of Quran", Recommendations to UTC #163 April 2020 on Script Proposals
14.0	U+0898..089C	5	L2/20-102		Moore, Lisa (2020-05-06), "Consensus 163-C14", UTC #163 Minutes
16.0	U+0897	1	L2/22-116		Sh., Rikza F. (2022-05-22), Proposal to Encode Four Pegon Characters
16.0	U+0897	1	L2/22-128		Anderson, Deborah; Whistler, Ken; Pournader, Roozbeh; Constable, Peter (2022-07-20), "4b Pegon", Recommendations to UTC #172 July 2022 on Script Proposals
16.0	U+0897	1	L2/22-121		Constable, Peter (2022-08-01), "D.1.4b Four Arabic Pegon Characters", Draft Minutes of UTC Meeting 172
16.0	U+0897	1	L2/23-157		Constable, Peter (2023-07-31), "Consensus 176-C17", UTC #176 Minutes, "The UTC approves the change of canonical combining class for U+0897 ARABIC PEPET to ccc=230, from ccc=0"
17.0	U+088F	1	L2/24-046		Evans, Lorna Priest (2024-02-16), Proposal to encode ARABIC LETTER NOON WITH RING ABOVE
17.0	U+088F	1	L2/24-068		Anderson, Deborah; Goregaokar, Manish; Kučera, Jan; Whistler, Ken; Pournader, Roozbeh; Constable, Peter (2024-04-18), "4a", Recommendations to UTC #179 April 2024 on Script Proposals
17.0	U+088F	1	L2/24-061		Constable, Peter (2024-04-29), "4a ARABIC LETTER NOON WITH RING ABOVE", UTC #179 Minutes
