= Qur'anic punctuation =

The Qur'an (lit. 'recitation') is meant to be recited. Its verses are divided according to the rhythm of the language. The Qur'anic punctuation is, therefore, not only based on the structure or the syntax of the sentence, but also on the need to pause, for breath or for effect. Pickthall observes, when a certain sound which marks the rhythm recurs, there is a strong pause and the verse ends naturally, although the sentence may go on to the next verse. Thus the Qur'anic punctuation affects the pronunciation of the words, rhythm, intonation and syllable separation.

== History ==
There are various conventions related to punctuation varying from time and place to another. Although there were manuscripts written on the topic, the convention that took off is attributed to Muhammad ibn Tayfour Sajawandi (d. 560 AH).

There are various hadiths related to the topic, one of them being:

Umm Salama narrated: "Rasulullah, when reading the Qur'an, would cut his recitation by ayah (he would stop at the verse endings). " and, giving an example from Fatiha, said "he would stop at the end of every verse."

— Musnad, VI, 302

== Punctuation marks ==
=== Full Stop ===
۝ - After a full stop, the last letter of the verse loses its vowel, if consonant, or converts the tanwin into an elongated alif, if an alif's tanwin.

=== Signs of pause - وقف (waqf) ===
These are generally placed at the top of the line they apply to in a verse.

==== Mandatory Pauses ====
م (m) - A mim at the top, it's an abbreviation of لازم (lāzim, 'necessary'). It means disregarding the sign may lead to change in the meaning.

ط (ṭ) - Abbreviation of مطلق (muṭlaq, 'absolute'). Full stop even though the verse is not complete.

لا (lā) - Lam and alif glyph representing the Arabic word لا (lā, 'no'). Forbidden stop. If stopped, the reciter should start from a place before the sign, unless it's the end of a verse. Pausing in this symbol may lead to meaning change or an incorrect statement or it will make nonsense.

س (s) or سكتة (saktah) - Abbreviation of سكتة (sakta, 'silence'). Pause without breathing out, giving a silence effect.

وقفة (waqfah) or وقف (waqf, 'stopping') - Same with the previous one, but with a somewhat longer pause.

==== Discretionary Pauses ====
Because the reciter may feel the need to stop, for example, because of need for a breath or other bodily necessities, there are these signs placed.

ج (j) - Abbreviation of جائز (jāʼiz, 'permissible'). It is better to stop, but in one's own discretion, may proceed also.

ز (z) - abbr of مجوَّز (mujawwaz, 'permitted'). It is better not to stop.

ص (ṣ) - abbr of مرخَّص (muraḵḵaṣ, 'admissible'). It is better not to stop but if the reciter is tired or any other valid reason, one may stop.

ق (q) - abbr of قيل عليه الوقف (qīla ʿalayhi l-waqf). It is better not to stop.

قف (qf) - abbr of يُوقَف عليه (yūqaf ʿalayh, 'it is stopped upon'). It is better to stop, facilitating the understanding of the verse's meaning.

صل (ṣl) - abbr of قد يُوصَل (qad yūṣal, 'it may be joined'). The majority view is that one should pause here.

◌ۗ - abbr of الوقف أولى (al-waqf awlā, 'stopping is preferable'). It is better to pause.

◌ۖ - abbr of الوصل أولى (al-waṣl awlā, 'joining is preferable'). It is better not to pause.

The reciter can stop or continue depending on his convenience.

◌ۛ - Named معانقة (muʿānaqa, 'embrace, hugging') signs, these three dots are usually paired and placed near each other. The reciter should stop at one of them, though which one is in their own discretion. In Indopak mushafs, these three dots are placed above a small ج sign.

=== Marginal marks ===
These show the divisions of the mushaf into chapters, parts and sections. It's arranged into 114 chapters (سورة, sūrah). Each chapter consists of a number of verses (آية, āyah). Verses are numbered at the end inside the full stop sign. A chapter may additionally be divided into sections (ركوع, rukūʿ). The end of a section is shown by an ʿayn (ع) sign.

The mushafs are also divided into thirty equal parts (جزء, juzʼ, pl. ajzāʼ), for those who wish to finish the recitation in a given time. These are indicated at the start of each one which occurs in 20 pages in most modern mushafs. The ajzāʼ are further divided, which makes them 60th parts of a mushaf, hizb. There are 3 different hizb signs at the margin indicating the place in the juz': الربع (al-rubʿ, 'the quarter') for the first quarter, النصف (al-nuṣf, 'the half') for the half, and الثلٰثة (al-ṯalāṯah) (abbr. of ثلٰثة ارباع - ṯalāṯat arbāʿ, 'three quarters') for the last quarter.

The word السجدة (al-sajadah, 'prostration') written on the margin or on an ayah sign means that a Muslim reciting that verse and the ones listening should offer a prostration. This sign is found in 14 places in a mushaf. All the sajda verses are Meccan.

There are some marginal signs used in the Indian subcontinent:

࣢ Used in the subcontinent, this indicates a difference of opinion on the pause.

وقف النبي (pause of the Prophet) for pause,

وقف مّنزَّل and وقف جبريل (pause of Gabriel) also for pause,

وقف غفران for pause,

وقف كفران for 'Do not pause'.

== See also ==
- Qāriʾ
- Qira'at
- Tajwid
- Tarteel
- Tilawa
