= Tajwid =

Rules governing pronunciation during recitation of the Quran

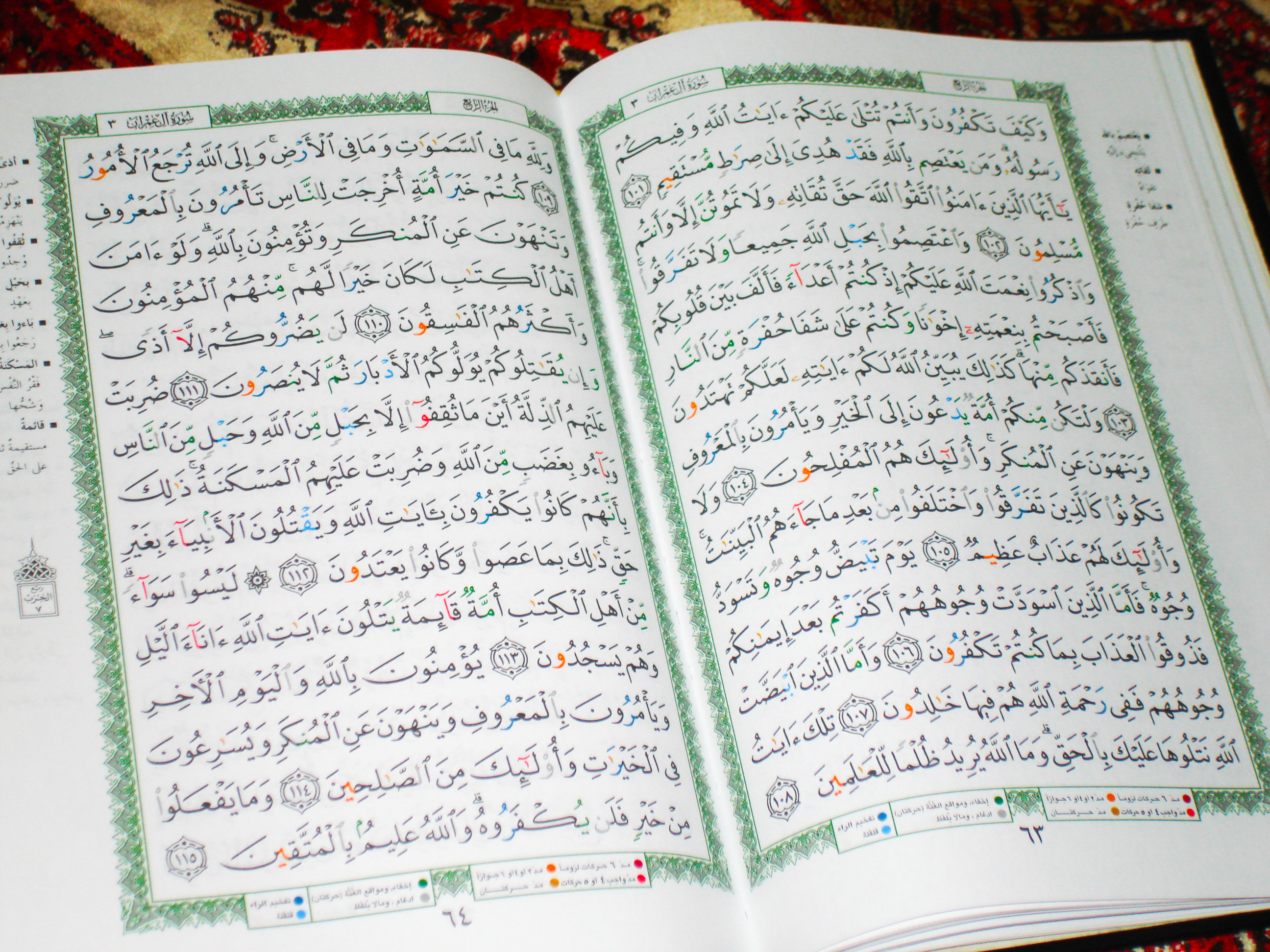
Muṣḥaf al-tajwīd, an edition of the Quran printed with colored letters to facilitate tajwid.

In the context of the recitation of the Quran, tajweed or tajwīd (Arabic: تجويد, romanized: tajwīd, lit. 'elocution', /tadʒ.wiːd/) is a set of rules for the correct pronunciation of the letters with all their qualities and applying the various traditional methods of recitation, known as qira'at. In Arabic, the term tajwid is derived from the verb جود (jawwada), meaning enhancement or to make something excellent. Technically, it means giving every letter its right in reciting the Quran.

Tajwīd is a system by which one learns the pronunciation of Quranic words as pronounced by the Islamic prophet Muhammad. The beginning of the system of tajwīd was when the early Islamic states or caliphates expanded in the third century of Hijra (9th century / 184–288 AH) under the Abbasid Caliphate, where errors in pronunciation increased in the Quran due to the entry of many non-Arab Muslims into Islam. So the scholars of the Quran began to write the rules of intonation. It is said that the first person to collect the system of tajwīd in his book Kitāb al-Qirā'āt was Imām Abu ʻUbaid al-Qāsim bin Salām (c. 770–838 CE) in the third century of Hijra.

== History ==
The history of Quranic recitation is tied to the history of qira'at, as each reciter had their own set of tajwid rules, with much overlap between them.

Abu Ubaid al-Qasim bin Salam (774–838 CE) was the first to develop a recorded system for tajwid, giving names to the rules of tajwid and putting it into writing in his book called al-Qiraat. He wrote about 25 reciters, including the 7 mutawatir reciters. He made the reality, transmitted through reciters of every generation, a system with defined rules, terms, and enunciation.

Abu Bakr Ibn Mujāhid (859–936 CE) wrote a book called Kitab al-Sab’ fil-qirā’āt "The Seven of the Recitations". He is the first to limit the number of recitations to the seven known.

Imam Al-Shatibi (1320–1388 CE) wrote a poem outlining the two most famous ways passed down from each of seven strong imams, known as ash-Shatibiyyah. In it, he documented the rules of recitation of Naafi’, Ibn Katheer, Abu ‘Amr, Ibn ‘Aamir, ‘Aasim, al-Kisaa’i, and Hamzah. It is 1173 lines long and a major reference for the seven qira’aat.

Ibn al-Jazari (1350–1429 CE) wrote two large poems about qira'at and tajwid. One was Durrat Al-Maa'nia (Arabic: الدرة المعنية), in the readings of three major reciters, added to the seven in the Shatibiyyah, making it ten. The other is Tayyibat An-Nashr (Arabic: طيبة النشر), which is 1014 lines on the ten major reciters in great detail, of which he also wrote a commentary.

== Religious obligation ==
Knowledge of the actual tajwīd rules is a community duty (farḍ al-kifāya). There is a difference of opinion on the ruling for individuals. Sheikh Zakariyya al-Ansari stated that it is sinful to recite in a way that changes the meaning or changes the grammar. If it does not change these two things, then it is not sinful, even if it is a clear error.

== Qur'an and hadith on tajwīd ==
The central Quranic verse about tajwid is verse 73:4: "...and recite the Qur'an with measured recitation." The word tartīl (Arabic: ترتيل), as used in this verse, is often also used in hadith in conjunction with its command. It means to articulate slowly, carefully, and precisely.

Abu Dawud's hadith collection has a chapter heading titled "Recommendation of (reciting with) tartīl in the Qur'an." It begins with the narration: "The Messenger of Allah peace and blessings be upon him said: One who was devoted to the Qur'an will be told to recite, ascend and recite carefully (Arabic: رتل rattil) as he recited carefully when he was in the world, for he will reach his abode when he comes to the last verse he recites (Sunan Abi Dawud 1464)." This narration describes the importance of the manner of recitation and its positive effects in the afterlife. The next narration describes the importance of prolongation (Arabic: مدا maddā): "Qatadah said: I asked Anas about the recitation of the Qur'an by the Prophet, peace and blessings be upon him. He said: He used to express all the long accents clearly (Arabic: كَانَ يَمُدُّ مَدًّا) (Sunan Abi Dawud 1465)." This narration also shows that even the companions of the prophet used some terms which are still used today in tajwīd rules.

== Arabic alphabet and grammar ==
Sun letters (red) and moon letters (black)

The Arabic alphabet has 28 basic letters, plus hamzah (ء).

The Arabic definite article is ال al- (i.e. the letter alif followed by lām). The lām in al- is pronounced if the letter after it is ألقَمرية (al-qamarīyyah, lunar), but if the letter after it is ألشَّمسية (ash-shamsīyyah, solar), the lām after it becomes part of the following letter (is assimilated). "Solar" and "lunar" became descriptions for these instances as the words for "the moon" and "the sun" (al-qamar and ash-shams, respectively) are examples of this rule.

== Emission points ==
There are 17 emission points (makhārij al-ḥurūf) of the letters, located in various regions of the throat, tongue, lips, nose, and the mouth as a whole for the prolonged (madd or mudd) letters.

The manner of articulation (ṣifat al-ḥurūf) refers to the different attributes of the letters. Some of the characteristics have opposites, while some are individual. An example of a characteristic would be the fricative consonant sound called ṣafīr, which is an attribute of air escaping from a tube.

=== Thickness and thinness ===
The emphatic consonants خ ص ض ط ظ غ ق, known as mufakhkham letters, are pronounced with a "heavy accent" (tafkhīm). This is done by either pharyngealization /ˤ/, i.e. pronounced while squeezing one's voice box, or by velarization /ˠ/. The remaining letters – the muraqqaq – have a "light accent" (tarqīq) as they are pronounced normally, without pharyngealization (except ع, which is often considered a pharyngeal sound).

ر (rāʼ ) is heavy when accompanied by a fatḥah or ḍammah and light when accompanied by a kasrah. If its vowel sound is cancelled, such as by a sukūn or the end of a sentence, then it is light when the first preceding voweled letter (without a sukun) has a kasrah. It is heavy if the first preceding voweled letter is accompanied by a fatḥah or ḍammah. For example, the ر at the end of the first word of the Sūrat "al-ʻAṣr" is heavy because the ع (ʻayn) has a fatḥah:

وَالْعَصْرِ

ل (lām) is only heavy in the word Allāh. If, however, the preceding vowel is a kasrah, then the ل in Allāh is light, such as in the Bismillah:

بِسْمِ اللّٰه

== Prolongation ==
Prolongation refers to the number of morae (beats of time) that are pronounced when a voweled letter (fatḥah, ḍammah, kasrah) is followed by a madd letter (alif, yāʼ, or wāw). The number of morae then becomes two. If these are at the end of the sentence, such as in all the verses in "al-Fatiha", then the number of morae can be more than two, but must be consistent from verse to verse. Additionally, if there is a maddah sign over the madd letter, it is held for four or five morae when followed by a hamzah (ء) and six morae when followed by a shaddah. For example, the end of the last verse in "al-Fatiha" has a six-mora maddah due to the shaddah on the ل (lām).

صِرَٰطَ ٱلَّذِينَ أَنْعَمْتَ عَلَيْهِمْ غَيْرِ ٱلمَغْضُوبِ عَلَيْهِمْ وَلاَ ٱلضَّآلِّين

== Sākinah (vowelless) letters ==
=== Nūn sākinah and tanwīn ===
Nūn sākinah refers to instances where the letter nūn is accompanied by a sukun sign, some cases of which involve tanwīn's nun with a sukun. There are then four ways it should be pronounced, depending on which letter immediately follows:

==== Iẓhār ====
1. iẓhār ("clarity"): the nūn sound is pronounced clearly without additional modifications when followed by "letters of the throat" (ء ه ع ح غ خ). Consider the nūn with a sukun pronounced regularly in the beginning of the last verse in "al-Fatiha":

صِرَٰطَ ٱلَّذِينَ أَنْعَمْتَ

Pronunciation: /sˤɪɾɔːtˤ alːaðina ʔanʕamta/

==== Iqlāb ====
1. iqlāb ("conversion"): the nūn sound is converted to a /m/ sound with imperfect closure if it is followed by a ب. Additionally, it is pronounced with ghunnah, i.e. nasalization which can be held for two morae. Consider the nūn sound on the tanwīn on the letter jīm that is pronounced as a mīm instead in the chapter Al-Hajj:

وَأَنْبَتَتْ مِنْ كُلِّ زَوْجٍ بَهِيجٍ

Pronunciation: /wa ʔãmbatat mɪn kulːɪ zawd͡ʒɪ̃m bahiːd͡ʒ/

==== Idghām ====
1. idghām ("merging"): the nūn sound fully assimilates to the following sound if the latter is و م ي ل ر or another ن. With ر and ل, there is no nasalization (ghunnah). The last 4 letters also receive ghunnah in the process (ي and و with ghunnah are pronounced as [ȷ̃:] and [w̃:]). Idghām only applies between two words and not in the middle of a word. Consider for example the nūn that is not pronounced in the second word of the Shahada (Fifth line of the Call to Prayer):

أَشْهَدُ أَن لَّا إِلَٰهَ إِلَّا ٱللَّٰهُ وَأَشْهَدُ أَنَّ مُحَمَّداً رَّسُولُ ٱللَّٰهِ

Pronunciation (dropped nūn indicated by dashes): ʔaʃhadu ʔa-lːaː ʔilaːha ʔɪlː ɔlˤːɔːhu wa ʔaʃhadu ʔanːa muħamːada- ɾasuːlu lˤːɔːh/

==== Ikhfāʼ ====
1. ikhfāʼ ("concealment"): the nūn sound is not fully pronounced (i.e. the tongue does not make full contact with the roof of the mouth as in a regular /n/ sound, close to /ŋ/ where the back of the tongue is raised but the front of the tongue is lowered) if it is followed by any letters other than those already listed, includes a ghunnah. Consider the nūn that is suppressed in the second verse of the chapter Al-Falaq:

مِنْ شَرِّ مَا خَلَقَ

Pronunciation: /mɪ̃[ŋ] ʃaɾːi maː xɑlɑqə/

=== Mīm sākinah ===
The term mīm sākinah refers to instances where the letter mīm is accompanied by a sukun. There are then three ways it should be pronounced, depending on which letter immediately follows:

1. idgham mutamathilayn ("labial merging") when followed by another mīm (usually indicated by a shaddah): the mīm is then merged with the following mīm and includes a ghunnah;
2. ikhfāʼ shafawī ("labial concealment"): the mīm is suppressed (i.e. lips not fully closed) when followed by a ب, with a ghunnah; Consider the mīm that is suppressed in the fourth verse of the chapter Al-Fil:
  - تَرْمِيهِمْ بِحِجَارَةٍ
3. iẓhār shafawī ("labial clarity"): the mīm is pronounced clearly with no amendment when followed by any letters other than those already listed.

== Qalqalah ==
The five qalqalah letters are the consonants ق ط د ج ب. Qalqalah is the addition of a slight "bounce" or reduced vowel sound /ə/ ([ə̆] or in extIPA as [ᵊ]) to the consonant whose vowel sound is otherwise cancelled, such as by a sukūn, shaddah, or the end of sentence. The "lesser bounce" occurs when the letter is in the middle of a word or at the end of the word but the reader joins it to the next word. A "medium bounce" is given when the letter is at the end of the word but is not accompanied by a shaddah, such as the end of the first verse of the Sūrat al-Falaq:

قُلْ أَعُوذُ بِرَبِّ ٱلْفَلَقِ

The biggest bounce is when the letter is at the end of the word and is accompanied by a shaddah, such as the end of the first verse of Sūrat al-Masad:

تَبَّتْ يدَاۤ أَبِی لَهَبٍ وَّتَبَّ

== Waṣl ==
Waṣl is the rule of not pronouncing alif as a glottal stop /ʔ/, assimilating to its adjacent vowel. It is indicated with the diacritic waṣlah, a small ṣād on the letter alif (ٱ). In Arabic, words starting with alif not using a hamzah (ا) receive a waṣlah...

بِسْمِ ٱللهِ ٱلرَّحْمٰنِ ٱلرَّحِيمِ

In most of the cases, the vowel that must be used before the alif waṣlah is obvious (the short or long vowel before alif waṣlah); but if it is preceded by a word ending on a sukun, then these are the rules:

Ending	Acquired value of sukūn after alif waṣlah	Example
Tanwin /-n/^{1}	Tanwin + kasrah /-ni/	مُحَمَّدٌ ٱلكَرِيمُ Muhammad the generous. /muħamːaduni lkariːm/
Plural mim^{2}	Damma /-u/	عَلَيْهِمُ السَّلام Peace be upon them. /alayhimu s-salām/
All other cases^{3}	Kasra /-i/	

1 In the case of Tanwin and alif waṣlah, the intrusive kasrah between them is not graphically represented.

2 Plural mim is the ending of هُمْ or كُمْ as noun suffixes and تُمْ as a verb suffix, which normally end as /hum/, /kum/ and /tum/ respectively. But in some cases /hum/ becomes /him/; nevertheless, it continues as /him-u/. These three always take a damma /-u/.

3 مِنْ is an exception to this, which always takes a fatha /-a/ if it be conjoined with the next word.

== Waqf ==
Waqf is the Arabic pausa rule; all words whose last letter end on a harakah become mute (sukūn) when being the last word of a sentence.

Last letter of a word with a ḥarakah	Inherited value of the ending ḥarakah in pausa (waqf)	Examples
ء (أ إ ئ ؤ) ب ت ث ج ح خ د ذ ر ز س ش ص ض ط ظ ع غ ف ق ك ل م ن ه و ي Ending on any ḥarakah^{1}	Sukūn /∅/	بَيْتْ - بَيْتٌ house اَلرَّبّْ - اَلرَّبُّ The Lord
ـًا ـًى	ـَا ـَى	مُسْتَشْفَى - مُسْتَشْفًى hospital شُكْرَا - شُكْرًا Thank you
ة Ending on any ḥarakah	هْ	مَلِكَهْ - مَلِكَةٍ queen
ءً	ءَا	إِنْشَاءَا - إِنْشَاءً creation

1 Hamza on the fourth row is an exception to 'ending on any ḥarakah.' It's only in the case of hamza having fathatayn, not otherwise.

In the case of the proper name عمرو /ʕamrun/, it is pronounced /ʕamr/ in pausa, and the last letter و wāw has no phonetical value (this writing convention is merely for the differentiation from the name عُمَر /ʕumar/). And in fact, عمرو is a triptote (something rare in proper nouns, since they are usually diptotes).

	عمرو /ʕamr/ (a proper name)	Pronunciation
Nominative	عَمْرٌو	/ˈʕam.run/
Accusative	عَمْرًو	/ˈʕam.ran/
Genitive	عَمْرٍو	/ˈʕam.rin/
Pausal form (waqf)	عَمْرْو	/ʕamr/

== Ishmam ==
Demonstration of ishmam occurring at 6:21.

"Ishmam" refers to what is seen in verse 11 of Chapter 12 (Yusuf (surah)). The word "تَأْمَنَّا" ("trust us") originates from "تـأمـنُـنَـا". The first nun is non-voweled due to the noons merging together to form "تَأْمَنَّا". In pronouncing this word, the recitor rounds their lips in an imitation of the dhummah after pronouncing the shaddah. The "ishmam" is not heard, but is seen, and is one of the rarest tajweed rules in the entire Qur'an.

== See also ==
- Qāriʾ
- Qira'at
- Quran reading
- Quranic punctuation
- Tarteel
- Tilawa

=== Analogous and related fields ===
- Elocution, the analogous modern Western study.
- Pronuntiatio, the analogous classical Western study.
- Shiksha, Hindu Vedic recital study.
- Phonetics
- Cantillation
- Santhiya
