= Arabic Extended-A =

- Range: U+08A0..U+08FF (96 code points)
- Plane: BMP
- Scripts: Arabic (95 char.); Common (1 char.)
- Major alphabets: African languages Bashkir; Belarusian; Berber; Chechen; Crimean Tatar; Hindko; Lak; Philippine languages Punjabi; Rohingya; Tatar; Arwi
- Assigned: 96 code points
- Unused: 0 reserved code points

Unicode version history
- 6.1 (2012): 39 (+39)
- 7.0 (2014): 47 (+8)
- 8.0 (2015): 50 (+3)
- 9.0 (2016): 73 (+23)
- 11.0 (2018): 74 (+1)
- 13.0 (2020): 84 (+10)
- 14.0 (2021): 96 (+12)

Unicode documentation
- Code chart ∣ Web page

Arabic Extended-A is a Unicode block encoding Qur'anic annotations and letter variants used for various non-Arabic languages.

== Block ==
Arabic Extended-A^{[1]} Official Unicode Consortium code chart (PDF)
	0	1	2	3	4	5	6	7	8	9	A	B	C	D	E	F
U+08Ax	ࢠ	ࢡ	ࢢ	ࢣ	ࢤ	ࢥ	ࢦ	ࢧ	ࢨ	ࢩ	ࢪ	ࢫ	ࢬ	ࢭ	ࢮ	ࢯ
U+08Bx	ࢰ	ࢱ	ࢲ	ࢳ	ࢴ	ࢵ	ࢶ	ࢷ	ࢸ	ࢹ	ࢺ	ࢻ	ࢼ	ࢽ	ࢾ	ࢿ
U+08Cx	ࣀ	ࣁ	ࣂ	ࣃ	ࣄ	ࣅ	ࣆ	ࣇ	ࣈ	ࣉ	࣊	࣋	࣌	࣍	࣎	࣏
U+08Dx	࣐	࣑	࣒	࣓	ࣔ	ࣕ	ࣖ	ࣗ	ࣘ	ࣙ	ࣚ	ࣛ	ࣜ	ࣝ	ࣞ	ࣟ
U+08Ex	࣠	࣡	࣢	ࣣ	ࣤ	ࣥ	ࣦ	ࣧ	ࣨ	ࣩ	࣪	࣫	࣬	࣭	࣮	࣯
U+08Fx	ࣰ	ࣱ	ࣲ	ࣳ	ࣴ	ࣵ	ࣶ	ࣷ	ࣸ	ࣹ	ࣺ	ࣻ	ࣼ	ࣽ	ࣾ	ࣿ
Notes: 1. As of Unicode version 16.0

== History ==
The following Unicode-related documents record the purpose and process of defining specific characters in the Arabic Extended-A block:

Version	Final code points (Note: Proposed code points and characters names may differ from final code points and names)	Count	L2 ID	WG2 ID	Document
6.1	U+08A0, 08A2..08AC, 08E4..08EF, 08F4..08FE	35	L2/10-288R	N3882	Priest, Lorna; Hosken, Martin (2010-08-12), Proposal to add Arabic script characters for African and Asian languages
6.1	U+08A0, 08A2..08AC, 08E4..08EF, 08F4..08FE	35	L2/10-221		Moore, Lisa (2010-08-23), "C.11.2", UTC #124 / L2 #221 Minutes
6.1	U+08A0, 08A2..08AC, 08E4..08EF, 08F4..08FE	35		N3903 (pdf, doc)	"M57.10", Unconfirmed minutes of WG2 meeting 57, 2011-03-31
6.1	U+08F0..08F3	4	L2/01-325		Milo, Thomas (2001-08-14), Three kinds of variation in Arabic script (sukun and jazm)
6.1	U+08F0..08F3	4	L2/02-275		Kew, Jonathan (2002-08-02), Proposal for Koranic alternate marks
6.1	U+08F0..08F3	4	L2/09-335R		Moore, Lisa (2009-11-10), "C.31", UTC #121 / L2 #218 Minutes
6.1	U+08F0..08F3	4	L2/10-094	N3816	King Fahd Glorious Quran Printing Complex (2010-03-21), Proposal to change some combining Arabic characters for Quranic representation
6.1	U+08F0..08F3	4	L2/09-419R	N3791	Pournader, Roozbeh (2010-03-30), Proposal to encode four combining Arabic characters for Koranic use
6.1	U+08F0..08F3	4	L2/10-155		Schmitt, Arno; Hosny, Khaled (2010-05-03), Reservations on L2/09-419 proposal
6.1	U+08F0..08F3	4	L2/10-221		Moore, Lisa (2010-08-23), "C.11.1", UTC #124 / L2 #221 Minutes
6.1	U+08F0..08F3	4		N3803 (pdf, doc)	"M56.08j", Unconfirmed minutes of WG 2 meeting no. 56, 2010-09-24
6.1	U+08F0..08F3	4	L2/10-371	N3920	Lazrek, Azzeddine (2010-09-30), Comments on Resolutions from Meeting 56 (and the 3rd edition) concerning Koranic characters
7.0	U+08A1	1	L2/10-288R	N3882	Priest, Lorna; Hosken, Martin (2010-08-12), Proposal to add Arabic script characters for African and Asian languages
7.0	U+08A1	1	L2/10-442R	N3988	Priest, Lorna; Hosken, Martin (2010-10-29), Proposal to add ARABIC LETTER BEH WITH HAMZA ABOVE
7.0	U+08A1	1		N3903 (pdf, doc)	"M57.10", Unconfirmed minutes of WG2 meeting 57, 2011-03-31
7.0	U+08A1	1		N4103	"11.2.6 Arabic Letter BEH WITH HAMZA ABOVE", Unconfirmed minutes of WG 2 meeting 58, 2012-01-03
7.0	U+08AD..08B1	5	L2/11-138		Yevlampiev, Ilya; Pentzlin, Karl; Joomagueldinov, Nurlan (2011-04-28), Proposal to encode Arabic characters used for Bashkir, Belarusian, Crimean Tatar, Karachay, Karakalpak, and Tatar languages
7.0	U+08AD..08B1	5	L2/11-190		Pournader, Roozbeh (2011-05-12), Proposed codepoints and properties for characters in L2/11-138
7.0	U+08AD..08B1	5	L2/11-201	N4065	Pournader, Roozbeh; Anderson, Deborah (2011-05-12), Proposed codepoints and properties for characters in "Proposal to encode Arabic characters used for Bashkir, Belarusian, Crimean Tatar, Karachay, Karakalpak, and Tatar languages"
7.0	U+08AD..08B1	5	L2/11-116		Moore, Lisa (2011-05-17), "C.17.1.1", UTC #127 / L2 #224 Minutes
7.0	U+08AD..08B1	5	L2/11-209	N4071, N4072	Yevlampiev, Ilya; Pentzlin, Karl; Joomagueldinov, Nurlan (2011-05-20), Revised Proposal to encode Arabic characters used for Bashkir, Belarusian, Crimean Tatar, and Tatar languages
7.0	U+08AD..08B1	5		N4103	"11.12 Arabic characters used for Bashkir, Belarusian, Crimean Tatar, and Tatar languages", Unconfirmed minutes of WG 2 meeting 58, 2012-01-03
7.0	U+08B2	1	L2/12-181R	N4271	Priest, Lorna A. (2012-05-09), Proposal to add ARABIC LETTER ZAIN WITH INVERTED V ABOVE
7.0	U+08B2	1	L2/12-112		Moore, Lisa (2012-05-17), "C.19", UTC #131 / L2 #228 Minutes
7.0	U+08FF	1	L2/11-033R	N3989	Priest, Lorna (2011-02-10), Proposal to add Arabic Mark Sideways Noon Ghunna
7.0	U+08FF	1	L2/11-016		Moore, Lisa (2011-02-15), "C.2.2", UTC #126 / L2 #223 Minutes
7.0	U+08FF	1		N4103	"11.2.5 Arabic Mark SIDEWAYS NOON GHUNNA", Unconfirmed minutes of WG 2 meeting 58, 2012-01-03
8.0	U+08B3..08B4, 08E3	3	L2/08-429		Buhari, Seyed (2008-12-04), Additional Arabic letters needed for Arwi Script
8.0	U+08B3..08B4, 08E3	3	L2/09-143		Buhari, Seyed (2009-04-15), Additional Arabic letters needed for Arwi Script
8.0	U+08B3..08B4, 08E3	3	L2/13-165		Anderson, Deborah; Whistler, Ken; Pournader, Roozbeh (2013-07-25), "2", Recommendations to UTC on Script Proposals
8.0	U+08B3..08B4, 08E3	3	L2/13-132		Moore, Lisa (2013-07-29), "Consensus 136-C22", UTC #136 Minutes
8.0	U+08B3..08B4, 08E3	3	L2/13-168		Ganesan, Naga (2013-07-29), Comment on L2/13-130: Writing classical Tamil in Arabic script
8.0	U+08B3..08B4, 08E3	3	L2/13-130R	N4474	Pournader, Roozbeh (2013-08-19), Proposal to encode three Arabic characters for Arwi
8.0	U+08B3..08B4, 08E3	3		N4553 (pdf, doc)	Umamaheswaran, V. S. (2014-09-16), "M62.04a", Minutes of WG 2 meeting 62 Adobe, San Jose, CA, USA
8.0	U+08B3..08B4, 08E3	3	L2/22-221		Nasrullah, Febri Muhammad (2022-09-11), On ARABIC LETTER KAF WITH DOT BELOW [Affects U+08B4]
8.0	U+08B3..08B4, 08E3	3	L2/22-248		Anderson, Deborah; et al. (2022-10-31), "3 Arabic", Recommendations to UTC #173 October 2022 on Script Proposals
8.0	U+08B3..08B4, 08E3	3	L2/22-241		Constable, Peter (2022-11-09), "D.1.5 Arabic: Kaf with dot below", Approved Minutes of UTC Meeting 173, "Add an annotation to U+08B4"
9.0	U+08B6..08BA	5	L2/13-178		Banafunzi, Hamid; Banafunzi, Marghani; Nuur, Maxamed (2013-08-31), Proposal to encode five Arabic script characters for the Bravanese (Chimiini)
9.0	U+08B6..08BA	5	L2/13-210		Anderson, Deborah; Whistler, Ken; McGowan, Rick; Pournader, Roozbeh (2013-10-31), "4", Recommendations to UTC #137 November 2013 on Script Proposals
9.0	U+08B6..08BA	5	L2/13-223R	N4498	Pournader, Roozbeh (2013-11-06), Proposal to encode four Arabic characters for Bravanese
9.0	U+08B6..08BA	5	L2/13-200		Moore, Lisa (2013-11-18), "C.3.1.1", UTC #137 Minutes
9.0	U+08B6..08BA	5		N4553 (pdf, doc)	Umamaheswaran, V. S. (2014-09-16), "M62.09c, M62.09i", Minutes of WG 2 meeting 62 Adobe, San Jose, CA, USA
9.0	U+08B6..08BA	5	L2/14-293R		Pournader, Roozbeh; Afshar, Shervin (2014-11-01), Proposal to Encode Arabic Letter Teh with Small Teh Above for Bravanese
9.0	U+08B6..08BA	5	L2/14-250		Moore, Lisa (2014-11-10), "C.3.3", UTC #141 Minutes
9.0	U+08BB..08BD	3	L2/14-104		Evans, Lorna (2014-04-29), Supporting the Warsh orthography for Arabic script
9.0	U+08BB..08BD	3	L2/14-129		Anderson, Deborah; Whistler, Ken; McGowan, Rick; Pournader, Roozbeh (2014-05-02), "8", Recommendations to UTC #139 May 2014 on Script Proposals
9.0	U+08BB..08BD	3	L2/14-170		Anderson, Deborah; Whistler, Ken; McGowan, Rick; Pournader, Roozbeh; Iancu, Laurențiu (2014-07-28), "18", Recommendations to UTC #140 August 2014 on Script Proposals
9.0	U+08BB..08BD	3	L2/14-207R		Pournader, Roozbeh (2014-08-09), Implications of the Unicode Arabic model for the Warsh orthography
9.0	U+08BB..08BD	3	L2/14-211	N4597	Evans, Lorna (2014-08-15), Proposal to encode Warsh-based Arabic script characters
9.0	U+08BB..08BD	3	L2/14-177		Moore, Lisa (2014-10-17), "Warsh Orthography (C.3.2)", UTC #140 Minutes
9.0	U+08BB..08BD	3	L2/16-052	N4603 (pdf, doc)	Umamaheswaran, V. S. (2015-09-01), "M63.03h", Unconfirmed minutes of WG 2 meeting 63
9.0	U+08D4	1	L2/14-148		Shaikh, Lateef Sagar (2014-06-26), Proposal to encode Quranic mark Ar-Rbaa used in Quran published in Pakistan
9.0	U+08D4	1	L2/14-170		Anderson, Deborah; Whistler, Ken; McGowan, Rick; Pournader, Roozbeh; Iancu, Laurențiu (2014-07-28), "7", Recommendations to UTC #140 August 2014 on Script Proposals
9.0	U+08D4	1		N4592	Shaikh, Lateef Sagar (2014-08-11), Proposal to encode Quranic mark Ar-Rub used in Quran published in Pakistan
9.0	U+08D4	1	L2/14-177		Moore, Lisa (2014-10-17), "Quranic mark Ar-Rbaa (C.3.1.1)", UTC #140 Minutes
9.0	U+08D4	1	L2/16-052	N4603 (pdf, doc)	Umamaheswaran, V. S. (2015-09-01), "M63.03g", Unconfirmed minutes of WG 2 meeting 63
9.0	U+08D5..08E2	14	L2/14-095		Shaikh, Lateef Sagar (2014-04-24), Proposal to encode Quranic marks used in Quran published in Pakistan
9.0	U+08D5..08E2	14	L2/14-129		Anderson, Deborah; Whistler, Ken; McGowan, Rick; Pournader, Roozbeh (2014-05-02), "7", Recommendations to UTC #139 May 2014 on Script Proposals
9.0	U+08D5..08E2	14	L2/14-100		Moore, Lisa (2014-05-13), "C.3.1.3", UTC #139 Minutes
9.0	U+08D5..08E2	14	L2/14-105R	N4589	Pournader, Roozbeh (2014-07-27), Proposal to encode fourteen Pakistani Quranic marks
9.0	U+08D5..08E2	14	L2/16-052	N4603 (pdf, doc)	Umamaheswaran, V. S. (2015-09-01), "M63.02b", Unconfirmed minutes of WG 2 meeting 63
9.0	U+08D5..08E2	14	L2/15-254		Moore, Lisa (2015-11-16), "Consensus 145-C16", UTC #145 Minutes, "Change the name of U+08E2 to ARABIC DISPUTED END OF AYAH"
9.0	U+08D5..08E2	14		N4739	"M64.03d", Unconfirmed minutes of WG 2 meeting 64, 2016-08-31
11.0	U+08D3	1	L2/16-044		Abudena, Mussa A. A. (2015-11-29), Proposal to encode Quranic marks used in Quran published in Libya with Commentary
11.0	U+08D3	1	L2/15-329		Abudena, Mussa A. A. (2015-12-02), Proposal to encode Quranic marks used in Quran published in Libya
11.0	U+08D3	1	L2/16-037		Anderson, Deborah; Whistler, Ken; McGowan, Rick; Pournader, Roozbeh; Glass, Andrew; Iancu, Laurențiu (2016-01-22), "15. Arabic", Recommendations to UTC #146 January 2016 on Script Proposals
11.0	U+08D3	1	L2/16-056		Shaikh, Lateef Sagar (2016-02-16), Proposal to encode Al-Dani Quranic marks used in Quran published in Libya
11.0	U+08D3	1	L2/16-100		Abudena, Mussa A. A. (2016-04-27), Comments on L2/16-056 Proposal to encode AlDani Quranic Marks
11.0	U+08D3	1	L2/16-102		Anderson, Deborah (2016-05-01), "#10", Consolidated Comments by Mansour, Evans, and Abudena on Al-Dani Quranic Marks (L2/16-056)
11.0	U+08D3	1	L2/16-153		Abudena, Mussa A. A. (2016-05-04), Types of Quran scripts
11.0	U+08D3	1	L2/16-156		Anderson, Deborah; Whistler, Ken; Pournader, Roozbeh; Glass, Andrew; Iancu, Laurențiu (2016-05-06), "5. Arabic", Recommendations to UTC #147 May 2016 on Script Proposals
11.0	U+08D3	1	L2/16-121		Moore, Lisa (2016-05-20), "C.10. Arabic", UTC #147 Minutes
11.0	U+08D3	1	L2/16-268		Lazrek, Azzeddine (2016-09-26), Suggestions on some Al-Dani Quranic Marks proposition
13.0	U+08BE..08C2	5	L2/18-032	N4961	Shaikh, Lateef Sagar (2018-01-17), Proposal to include Hindko alphabets
13.0	U+08BE..08C2	5	L2/18-168		Anderson, Deborah; Whistler, Ken; Pournader, Roozbeh; Moore, Lisa; Liang, Hai; Chapman, Chris; Cook, Richard (2018-04-28), "21. Hindko", Recommendations to UTC #155 April-May 2018 on Script Proposals
13.0	U+08BE..08C2	5	L2/18-174	N4962	Anderson, Deborah; Pournader, Roozbeh (2018-05-02), Hindko additions for Arabic
13.0	U+08BE..08C2	5	L2/18-115		Moore, Lisa (2018-05-09), "C.3.1", UTC #155 Minutes
13.0	U+08BE..08C2	5		N5020 (pdf, doc)	Umamaheswaran, V. S. (2019-01-11), "10.3.12", Unconfirmed minutes of WG 2 meeting 67
13.0	U+08C3..08C4	2	L2/18-094	N4959	Evans, Lorna; Warren-Rothlin, Andy (2018-04-26), Proposal to encode additional Arabic script characters for Hausa
13.0	U+08C3..08C4	2	L2/18-168		Anderson, Deborah; Whistler, Ken; Pournader, Roozbeh; Moore, Lisa; Liang, Hai; Chapman, Chris; Cook, Richard (2018-04-28), "19. Arabic for Hausa", Recommendations to UTC #155 April-May 2018 on Script Proposals
13.0	U+08C3..08C4	2	L2/18-115		Moore, Lisa (2018-05-09), "C.3.3", UTC #155 Minutes
13.0	U+08C3..08C4	2		N5020 (pdf, doc)	Umamaheswaran, V. S. (2019-01-11), "10.3.11", Unconfirmed minutes of WG 2 meeting 67
13.0	U+08C5..08C6	2	L2/19-118R	N5049	Patel, Neil; Riley, Charles; MacLean, Jesus (2019-03-25), Proposal to add Arabic letter JEEM WITH THREE DOTS ABOVE and JEEM WITH THREE DOTS BELOW
13.0	U+08C5..08C6	2	L2/19-173		Anderson, Deborah; et al. (2019-04-29), "ARABIC LETTER JEEM WITH THREE DOTS", Recommendations to UTC #159 April-May 2019 on Script Proposals
13.0	U+08C5..08C6	2	L2/19-122		Moore, Lisa (2019-05-08), "C.9.4", UTC #159 Minutes
13.0	U+08C5..08C6	2		N5122	"M68.10", Unconfirmed minutes of WG 2 meeting 68, 2019-12-31
13.0	U+08C7	1	L2/19-111R		Evans, Lorna; Malik, M. G. Abbas (2019-05-01), Proposal to encode ARABIC LETTER LAM WITH SMALL ARABIC LETTER TAH ABOVE in the UCS
13.0	U+08C7	1	L2/19-173		Anderson, Deborah; et al. (2019-04-29), "ARABIC LETTER LAM WITH SMALL ARABIC LETTER TAH ABOVE", Recommendations to UTC #159 April-May 2019 on Script Proposals
13.0	U+08C7	1	L2/19-122		Moore, Lisa (2019-05-08), "C.9.3", UTC #159 Minutes
14.0	U+08B5	1	L2/19-313		van Putten, Marijn; Pournader, Roozbeh (2019-09-29), Proposal to encode an Arabic qaf with dot below
14.0	U+08B5	1	L2/19-343		Anderson, Deborah; Whistler, Ken; Pournader, Roozbeh; Moore, Lisa; Liang, Hai (2019-10-06), "b. Arabic qaf with dot below", Recommendations to UTC #161 October 2019 on Script Proposals
14.0	U+08B5	1	L2/19-323		Moore, Lisa (2019-10-01), "C.6.2", UTC #161 Minutes
14.0	U+08C8	1	L2/19-077		Shaikh, Lateef Sagar (2019-03-03), Proposal to include Balti alphabet
14.0	U+08C8	1	L2/19-173		Anderson, Deborah; et al. (2019-04-29), "c. Balti", Recommendations to UTC #159 April-May 2019 on Script Proposals
14.0	U+08C8	1	L2/19-252		Shaikh, Lateef Sagar (2019-05-28), Proposal to include Balti alphabet ARABIC LETTER GRAF
14.0	U+08C8	1	L2/19-286		Anderson, Deborah; Whistler, Ken; Pournader, Roozbeh; Moore, Lisa; Liang, Hai (2019-07-22), "6. Arabic", Recommendations to UTC #160 July 2019 on Script Proposals
14.0	U+08C8	1	L2/19-270		Moore, Lisa (2019-10-07), "C.9.1", UTC #160 Minutes
14.0	U+08C8	1	L2/21-069R		Scherer, Markus; Davis, Mark; Freytag, Asmus; Chapman, Christopher; Whistler, Ken; Constable, Peter (2021-04-26), "PRI428i: U+08C8 ArabicShaping name", UTC #167 properties feedback & recommendations
14.0	U+08C8	1	L2/21-066		Moore, Lisa (2021-05-05), "Action Item 167-A71", UTC #167 Minutes
14.0	U+08C9..08D2	10	L2/19-306	N5142	Pournader, Roozbeh; Anderson, Deborah (2019-09-29), Arabic additions for Quranic orthographies
14.0	U+08C9..08D2	10	L2/19-343		Anderson, Deborah; Whistler, Ken; Pournader, Roozbeh; Moore, Lisa; Liang, Hai (2019-10-06), "a. Additions for Quranic orthographies", Recommendations to UTC #161 October 2019 on Script Proposals
14.0	U+08C9..08D2	10	L2/19-323		Moore, Lisa (2019-10-01), "Consensus 161-C4", UTC #161 Minutes
14.0	U+08C9..08D2	10	L2/20-105		Anderson, Deborah; Whistler, Ken; Pournader, Roozbeh; Moore, Lisa; Constable, Peter; Liang, Hai (2020-04-20), "3f. Comments on L2/19-306", Recommendations to UTC #163 April 2020 on Script Proposals
14.0	U+08C9..08D2	10	L2/20-102		Moore, Lisa (2020-05-06), "Consensus 163-C15", UTC #163 Minutes, "The UTC changes the name for U+08D2 from ARABIC ROUND DOT INSIDE LARGE CIRCLE BELOW to ARABIC LARGE ROUND DOT INSIDE CIRCLE BELOW"
