= Arabic Extended-C =

- Range: U+10EC0..U+10EFF (64 code points)
- Plane: SMP
- Scripts: Arabic
- Assigned: 60 code points
- Unused: 4 reserved code points

Unicode Version History
- 15.0 (2022): 3 (+3)
- 16.0 (2024): 7 (+4)
- 17.0 (2025): 21 (+14)
- 18.0 (2026): 60 (+39)

Unicode documentation
- Code chart ∣ Web page

Arabic Extended-C is a Unicode block encoding Qur'anic marks used in Turkey or Libya, and additional letters for Pegon in Indonesia.

== Block ==
Arabic Extended-C^{[1]}^{[2]} Official Unicode Consortium code chart (PDF)
	0	1	2	3	4	5	6	7	8	9	A	B	C	D	E	F
U+10ECx			𐻂	𐻃	𐻄	𐻅	𐻆	𐻇		𐻉	𐻊	𐻋	𐻌	𐻍	𐻎	𐻏
U+10EDx	𐻐	𐻑	𐻒	𐻓	𐻔	𐻕	𐻖	𐻗	𐻘	𐻙	𐻚	𐻛	𐻜	𐻝	𐻞	𐻟
U+10EEx	𐻠	𐻡	𐻢	𐻣	𐻤	𐻥	𐻦	𐻧	𐻨	𐻩	𐻪	𐻫	𐻬	𐻭	𐻮	
U+10EFx	𐻰	𐻱	𐻲	𐻳	𐻴	𐻵	𐻶	𐻷	𐻸	𐻹	𐻺	𐻻	𐻼	𐻽	𐻾	𐻿
Notes 1.As of Unicode version 18.0 2.Grey areas indicate non-assigned code points

== History ==
The following Unicode-related documents record the purpose and process of defining specific characters in the Arabic Extended-C block:

Version	Final code points (Note: Proposed code points and characters names may differ from final code points and names)	Count	L2 ID	Document
15.0	U+10EFD..10EFF	3	L2/21-133	Shaikh, Lateef Sagar (2021-06-24), Proposal to encode Quranic marks used in Turkey
15.0	U+10EFD..10EFF	3	L2/21-130	Anderson, Deborah; Whistler, Ken; Pournader, Roozbeh; Liang, Hai (2021-07-26), "6a. Quranic Marks used in Turkey", Recommendations to UTC #168 July 2021 on Script Proposals
15.0	U+10EFD..10EFF	3	L2/21-123	Cummings, Craig (2021-08-03), "Consensus 168-C22", Draft Minutes of UTC Meeting 168
15.0	U+10EFD..10EFF	3	L2/21-181	Pournader, Roozbeh (2021-08-25), Allocating Arabic Extended-C in SMP and Arabic code point changes
15.0	U+10EFD..10EFF	3	L2/21-174	Anderson, Deborah; Whistler, Ken; Pournader, Roozbeh; Liang, Hai (2021-10-01), "4a Arabic Allocation in SMP", Recommendations to UTC #169 October 2021 on Script Proposals
15.0	U+10EFD..10EFF	3	L2/21-167	Cummings, Craig (2022-01-27), "Consensus 169-C2", Approved Minutes of UTC Meeting 169, "Move the following characters -- U+0895 ARABIC SMALL LOW WORD SAKTA to U+10EFD U+0896 ARABIC SMALL LOW WORD QASR to U+10EFE U+0897 ARABIC SMALL LOW WORD MADDA to U+10EFF"
16.0	U+10EC2..10EC4	3	L2/22-116	Sh., Rikza F. (2022-05-22), Proposal to Encode Four Pegon Characters
16.0	U+10EC2..10EC4	3	L2/22-128	Anderson, Deborah; Whistler, Ken; Pournader, Roozbeh; Constable, Peter (2022-07-20), "4b Pegon", Recommendations to UTC #172 July 2022 on Script Proposals
16.0	U+10EC2..10EC4	3	L2/22-121	Constable, Peter (2022-08-01), "D.1.4b Four Arabic Pegon Characters", Draft Minutes of UTC Meeting 172
16.0	U+10EFC	1	L2/21-204	Shaikh, Lateef Sagar (2021-08-11), Proposal to encode Quranic Superscript Alef Motahafar used in Quran published in Libya
16.0	U+10EFC	1	L2/21-174	Anderson, Deborah; Whistler, Ken; Pournader, Roozbeh; Liang, Hai (2021-10-01), "4b Quranic Superscript Alef Motahafar", Recommendations to UTC #169 October 2021 on Script Proposals
16.0	U+10EFC	1	L2/22-023	Anderson, Deborah; Whistler, Ken; Pournader, Roozbeh; Constable, Peter (2022-01-22), "6e Quranic Superscript Alef Motahafar", Recommendations to UTC #170 January 2022 on Script Proposals
16.0	U+10EFC	1	L2/22-047	Shaikh, Lateef Sagar (2022-02-15), Proposal to encode Arabic Combining Alef Overlay used in Quran published in Libya
16.0	U+10EFC	1	L2/22-068	Anderson, Deborah; Whistler, Ken; Pournader, Roozbeh; Constable, Peter (2022-04-15), "4b Combining Alef Overlay", Recommendations to UTC #171 April 2022 on Script Proposals
16.0	U+10EFC	1	L2/22-061	Constable, Peter (2022-07-27), "D.1 Section 4b", Approved Minutes of UTC Meeting 171
17.0	U+10EC5, 10EFB	2	L2/22-153	Sh., Rikza F. (2022-07-07), Proposal to Encode Three Quranic Arabic Characters
17.0	U+10EC5, 10EFB	2	L2/22-128	Anderson, Deborah; Whistler, Ken; Pournader, Roozbeh; Constable, Peter (2022-07-20), "4c Three Quranic Arabic Characters", Recommendations to UTC #172 July 2022 on Script Proposals
17.0	U+10EC5, 10EFB	2	L2/22-121	Constable, Peter (2022-08-01), "Action item 172-A12", Draft Minutes of UTC Meeting 172
17.0	U+10EC5, 10EFB	2	L2/22-281R	Sh., Rikza F. (2022-10-17), Proposal to Encode Two Quranic Arabic Characters
17.0	U+10EC5, 10EFB	2	L2/23-012	Anderson, Deborah; et al. (2023-01-17), "2a Two Quranic Characters", Recommendations to UTC #174 January 2023 on Script Proposals
17.0	U+10EC5, 10EFB	2	L2/23-005	Constable, Peter (2023-02-01), "Consensus 174-C18", UTC #174 Minutes
17.0	U+10EC6	1	L2/23-121	Hosny, Khaled; Jbire, Mostafa (2023-04-20), Proposal to encode Arabic Letter Thin Noon
17.0	U+10EC6	1	L2/23-164	Anderson, Deborah; Kučera, Jan; Whistler, Ken; Pournader, Roozbeh; Constable, Peter (2023-07-21), "3a Quranic Thin Noon", Recommendations to UTC #176 July 2023 on Script Proposals
17.0	U+10EC6	1	L2/23-157	Constable, Peter (2023-07-31), "Consensus 176-C33", UTC #176 Minutes
17.0	U+10EC7	1	L2/24-055	Jacquerye, Denis Moyogo (2024-02-11), Proposal to add Arabic letter for Swahili
17.0	U+10EC7	1	L2/24-068	Anderson, Deborah; Goregaokar, Manish; Kučera, Jan; Whistler, Ken; Pournader, Roozbeh; Constable, Peter (2024-04-18), "4b Arabic letter for Swahili", Recommendations to UTC #179 April 2024 on Script Proposals
17.0	U+10EC7	1	L2/24-061	Constable, Peter (2024-04-29), "Consensus 179-C48", UTC #179 Minutes, "Provisionally assign U+10EC7 ARABIC LETTER YEH WITH FOUR DOTS BELOW"
17.0	U+10ED0	1	L2/23-103R	Evans, Lorna Priest (2023-07-10), Proposal for ARABIC BIBLICAL END OF VERSE
17.0	U+10ED0	1	L2/23-083	Anderson, Deborah; Kučera, Jan; Whistler, Ken; Pournader, Roozbeh; Constable, Peter (2023-04-21), "1 Arabic", Recommendations to UTC #175 April 2023 on Script Proposals
17.0	U+10ED0	1	L2/23-076	Constable, Peter (2023-05-01), "Consensus 175-C13", UTC #175 Minutes
17.0	U+10ED1..10ED8	8	L2/24-077	Pournader, Roozbeh; Sh., Rikza F.; Moslehi, Amir Mahdi (2024-03-18), Proposal to encode twenty-five more Arabic honorifics
17.0	U+10ED1..10ED8	8	L2/24-068	Anderson, Deborah; Goregaokar, Manish; Kučera, Jan; Whistler, Ken; Pournader, Roozbeh; Constable, Peter (2024-04-18), "4c Twenty-five more honorifics", Recommendations to UTC #179 April 2024 on Script Proposals
17.0	U+10ED1..10ED8	8	L2/24-061	Constable, Peter (2024-04-29), "Consensus 179-C49", UTC #179 Minutes, "Provisionally assign 25 Arabic code points"
17.0	U+10ED1..10ED8	8	L2/24-166	Anderson, Deborah; Goregaokar, Manish; Kučera, Jan; Whistler, Ken; Pournader, Roozbeh; Constable, Peter (2024-07-18), "3c Misspellings in some honorific character names", Recommendations to UTC #180 July 2024 on Script Proposals
17.0	U+10ED1..10ED8	8	L2/24-159	Constable, Peter (2024-07-29), "3c Misspellings in some honorific character names", UTC #180 Minutes
17.0	U+10EFA	1	L2/23-248	Shaikh, Lateef Sagar (2023-09-26), Proposal to encode Arabic Double Vertical Bar Below
17.0	U+10EFA	1	L2/23-238R	Anderson, Deborah; Kučera, Jan; Whistler, Ken; Pournader, Roozbeh; Constable, Peter (2023-11-01), "3a Arabic Double Vertical Bar Below", Recommendations to UTC #177 November 2023 on Script Proposals
17.0	U+10EFA	1	L2/23-231	Constable, Peter (2023-12-08), "Consensus 177-C21", UTC #177 Minutes
18.0	U+10EC9..10ECF, 10EF0..10EF8	16	L2/24-178	Sh., Rikza F. (2024-06-05), PROPOSAL TO ENCODE SIXTEEN QURANIC ARABIC CHARACTERS
18.0	U+10EC9..10ECF, 10EF0..10EF8	16	L2/24-166	Anderson, Deborah; Goregaokar, Manish; Kučera, Jan; Whistler, Ken; Pournader, Roozbeh; Constable, Peter (2024-07-18), "3d Sixteen Quranic Arabic Characters", Recommendations to UTC #180 July 2024 on Script Proposals
18.0	U+10EC9..10ECF, 10EF0..10EF8	16	L2/24-159	Constable, Peter (2024-07-29), "Consensus 180-C26", UTC #180 Minutes, "Provisionally assign 16 Arabic code points ..."
18.0	U+10EC9..10ECF, 10EF0..10EF8	16	L2/25-226	"Consensus 185-C40", UTC #185 Minutes, 2025-10-29, "UTC accepts for encoding in Unicode 18.0 ..."
18.0	U+10ED9..10EEE, 10EF9	23	L2/24-131	Goregaokar, Manish; Hosny, Khaled; Yang, Ben; Hasan, Mohamed (2024-05-04), Proposal to encode Arabic Crown Letters
18.0	U+10ED9..10EEE, 10EF9	23	L2/24-166	Anderson, Deborah; Goregaokar, Manish; Kučera, Jan; Whistler, Ken; Pournader, Roozbeh; Constable, Peter (2024-07-18), "3a Crown Letters", Recommendations to UTC #180 July 2024 on Script Proposals
18.0	U+10ED9..10EEE, 10EF9	23	L2/24-159	Constable, Peter (2024-07-29), "Consensus 180-C22", UTC #180 Minutes, "Provisionally assign 22 Arabic crown letter code points and one crown letter combining mark ..."
18.0	U+10ED9..10EEE, 10EF9	23	L2/25-226	"Consensus 185-C40", UTC #185 Minutes, 2025-10-29, "UTC accepts for encoding in Unicode 18.0 ..."
