= Indic Siyaq Numbers =

- Range: U+1EC70..U+1ECBF (80 code points)
- Plane: SMP
- Scripts: Common
- Assigned: 68 code points
- Unused: 12 reserved code points

Unicode version history
- 11.0 (2018): 68 (+68)

Unicode documentation
- Code chart ∣ Web page

Indic Siyaq Numbers is a Unicode block containing a specialized subset of the Arabic script that was used for accounting in India under the Mughals by the 17th century through the middle of the 20th century.

== Block ==
Indic Siyaq Numbers^{[1]}^{[2]} Official Unicode Consortium code chart (PDF)
	0	1	2	3	4	5	6	7	8	9	A	B	C	D	E	F
U+1EC7x		𞱱	𞱲	𞱳	𞱴	𞱵	𞱶	𞱷	𞱸	𞱹	𞱺	𞱻	𞱼	𞱽	𞱾	𞱿
U+1EC8x	𞲀	𞲁	𞲂	𞲃	𞲄	𞲅	𞲆	𞲇	𞲈	𞲉	𞲊	𞲋	𞲌	𞲍	𞲎	𞲏
U+1EC9x	𞲐	𞲑	𞲒	𞲓	𞲔	𞲕	𞲖	𞲗	𞲘	𞲙	𞲚	𞲛	𞲜	𞲝	𞲞	𞲟
U+1ECAx	𞲠	𞲡	𞲢	𞲣	𞲤	𞲥	𞲦	𞲧	𞲨	𞲩	𞲪	𞲫	𞲬	𞲭	𞲮	𞲯
U+1ECBx	𞲰	𞲱	𞲲	𞲳	𞲴											
Notes: 1. As of Unicode version 16.0; 2. Grey areas indicate non-assigned code points

== History ==
The following Unicode-related documents record the purpose and process of defining specific characters in the Indic Siyaq Numbers block:

Version	Final code points (Note: Proposed code points and characters names may differ from final code points and names)	Count	L2 ID	WG2 ID	Document
11.0	U+1EC71..1ECB4	68	L2/07-414		Pandey, Anshuman (2007-12-04), Proposal to Encode Siyaq Numerals
11.0	U+1EC71..1ECB4	68	L2/09-166	N4118	Pandey, Anshuman (2009-05-02), A Model for Encoding Numerals of the Ottoman Siyaq System
11.0	U+1EC71..1ECB4	68	L2/11-270	N4123	Pandey, Anshuman (2011-07-13), Preliminary Proposal to Encode Indic Siyaq Numbers
11.0	U+1EC71..1ECB4	68	L2/15-149		Anderson, Deborah; Whistler, Ken; McGowan, Rick; Pournader, Roozbeh; Pandey, Anshuman; Glass, Andrew (2015-05-03), "19. Indic Siyaq Numbers", Recommendations to UTC #143 May 2015 on Script Proposals
11.0	U+1EC71..1ECB4	68	L2/15-312		Anderson, Deborah; Whistler, Ken; McGowan, Rick; Pournader, Roozbeh; Glass, Andrew; Iancu, Laurențiu (2015-11-01), "11. Siyaq", Recommendations to UTC #145 November 2015 on Script Proposals
11.0	U+1EC71..1ECB4	68	L2/15-121R2		Pandey, Anshuman (2015-11-05), Proposal to Encode Indic Siyaq Numbers
11.0	U+1EC71..1ECB4	68	L2/15-254		Moore, Lisa (2015-11-16), "D.15", UTC #145 Minutes
11.0	U+1EC71..1ECB4	68	L2/16-121		Moore, Lisa (2016-05-20), "D.11.3", UTC #147 Minutes
11.0	U+1EC71..1ECB4	68	L2/19-047		Anderson, Deborah; et al. (2019-01-13), "22", Recommendations to UTC #158 January 2019 on Script Proposals
