= Arabic Supplement =

- Range: U+0750..U+077F (48 code points)
- Plane: BMP
- Scripts: Arabic
- Major alphabets: Khowar; Torwali; Burushaski; Shahmukhi; Arwi; Jawi script Ajami script Early Persian
- Assigned: 48 code points
- Unused: 0 reserved code points

Unicode version history
- 4.1 (2005): 30 (+30)
- 5.1 (2008): 48 (+18)

Unicode documentation
- Code chart ∣ Web page

Arabic Supplement is a Unicode block that encodes Arabic letter variants used for writing non-Arabic languages, including languages of Pakistan and Africa, and Old Persian.

== Block ==
Arabic Supplement^{[1]} Official Unicode Consortium code chart (PDF)
	0	1	2	3	4	5	6	7	8	9	A	B	C	D	E	F
U+075x	ݐ	ݑ	ݒ	ݓ	ݔ	ݕ	ݖ	ݗ	ݘ	ݙ	ݚ	ݛ	ݜ	ݝ	ݞ	ݟ
U+076x	ݠ	ݡ	ݢ	ݣ	ݤ	ݥ	ݦ	ݧ	ݨ	ݩ	ݪ	ݫ	ݬ	ݭ	ݮ	ݯ
U+077x	ݰ	ݱ	ݲ	ݳ	ݴ	ݵ	ݶ	ݷ	ݸ	ݹ	ݺ	ݻ	ݼ	ݽ	ݾ	ݿ
Notes: 1. As of Unicode version 16.0

== History ==
The following Unicode-related documents record the purpose and process of defining specific characters in the Arabic Supplement block:

Version	Final code points (Note: Proposed code points and characters names may differ from final code points and names)	Count	L2 ID	WG2 ID	Document
4.1	U+0750..0769	26	L2/02-274		Kew, Jonathan (2002-07-16), Proposal for extensions to the Arabic block
4.1	U+0750..0769	26	L2/03-168		Kew, Jonathan (2003-06-02), Proposal to encode Arabic-script letters for African languages
4.1	U+0750..0769	26	L2/03-176		Kew, Jonathan (2003-06-03), Proposal to encode Jawi and Moroccan Arabic GAF characters
4.1	U+0750..0769	26	L2/03-210		Kew, Jonathan (2003-06-12), Draft chart showing UTC #95 additions to Arabic blocks
4.1	U+0750..0769	26	L2/03-223	N2598	Kew, Jonathan (2003-07-10), Proposal to encode additional Arabic-script characters
4.1	U+076A	1	L2/03-228R2	N2627	Kew, Jonathan (2003-09-29), Proposal to encode Marwari LAM WITH BAR Character
4.1	U+076A	1	L2/03-240R3		Moore, Lisa (2003-10-21), "Marwari Lam with Bar (B.14.6)", UTC #96 Minutes
4.1	U+076B..076D	3	L2/04-025R	N2723	Kew, Jonathan (2004-03-15), Proposal to encode Additional Arabic script characters
5.1	U+076E..077D	16		N3117	Bashir, Elena; Hussain, Sarmad; Anderson, Deborah (2006-07-27), Proposal to add characters needed for Khowar, Torwali, and Burushaski
5.1	U+076E..077D	16	L2/06-150		Bashir, Elena (2006-05-05), Letters of support for characters needed for Khowar, Torwali, and Burushaski
5.1	U+076E..077D	16	L2/06-149		Bashir, Elena; Hussain, Sarmad; Anderson, Deborah (2006-05-09), Proposal to add characters needed for Khowar, Torwali, and Burushaski
5.1	U+076E..077D	16	L2/06-108		Moore, Lisa (2006-05-25), "C.18", UTC #107 Minutes
5.1	U+076E..077D	16		N3153 (pdf, doc)	Umamaheswaran, V. S. (2007-02-16), "M49.8", Unconfirmed minutes of WG 2 meeting 49 AIST, Akihabara, Tokyo, Japan; 2006-09-25/29
5.1	U+076E..077D	16	L2/06-328		Pournader, Roozbeh (2006-10-11), Proposal to change the previously decided name of some Arabic characters
5.1	U+076E..077D	16	L2/06-324R2		Moore, Lisa (2006-11-29), "Consensus 109-C27", UTC #109 Minutes
5.1	U+076E..077D	16	L2/07-268	N3253 (pdf, doc)	Umamaheswaran, V. S. (2007-07-26), "M50.4e", Unconfirmed minutes of WG 2 meeting 50, Frankfurt-am-Main, Germany; 2007-04-24/27, "Names of characters in the range 0773 to 077D are changed by replacing the word 'EASTERN' with 'EXTENDED' in them."
5.1	U+076E..077D	16	L2/07-264		Anderson, Deborah (2007-08-06), Shaping behavior of Burushaski characters and other Arabic additions in L2/06-149
5.1	U+076E..077D	16	L2/07-225		Moore, Lisa (2007-08-21), "Burushaski Shaping Behavior", UTC #112 Minutes
5.1	U+076E..077D	16	L2/10-158		Mansour, Kamal (2010-05-04), Shaping Behavior of U+0777
5.1	U+076E..077D	16	L2/10-108		Moore, Lisa (2010-05-19), "Action item 123-A50", UTC #123 / L2 #220 Minutes, "Suggest clarifying text in section 8.2 of TUS 5.2 pp 248-249 regarding Yeh and Farsi Yeh joining groups."
5.1	U+077E..077F	2	L2/06-345R	N3180R	Everson, Michael; Pournader, Roozbeh; Sarbar, Elnaz (2006-10-24), Proposal to encode eight Arabic characters for Persian and Azerbaijani in the UCS
5.1	U+077E..077F	2	L2/06-324R2		Moore, Lisa (2006-11-29), "C.12", UTC #109 Minutes
5.1	U+077E..077F	2	L2/07-268	N3253 (pdf, doc)	Umamaheswaran, V. S. (2007-07-26), "M50.15", Unconfirmed minutes of WG 2 meeting 50, Frankfurt-am-Main, Germany; 2007-04-24/27
