= Nogai alphabets =

Nogai writing is a script used to write the Nogai language. During its existence, it has changed its graphic basis several times. Currently, the Nogai script functions in the Cyrillic alphabet. There are 4 stages in the history of Nogai writing:

- before 1920s — unwritten; Kypchak and/or Chagatai was used instead with the Perso-Arabic script
- 1926-1928 — standardized Arabic script specific to Nogai language
- 1928—1938 — writing based on the Latin alphabet
- from 1938 — writing based on the Cyrillic alphabet

== Writing based on the Arabic script ==
Until the mid-1920s, the Arabic alphabet was used to a very limited extent for the Nogai language. It included all the letters of the Arabic alphabet, as well as additional characters ڭ, ۉ, وَ, پ, ى‍, گ, ‍ىُ‍ for specific sounds of the Nogai language. In 1926, the Arabic-based Nogai script was reformed to approximate the Nogai phonetics, resembling the Arabic-script orthography for the Kazakh language. This version was published by N. Nogaily in the translation of the book "Popular exposition of the charter of the Komsomol." However, this version of the alphabet caused serious objections and was revised by the author in 1927. The revised 1927 version was based on Tatar Yaña imlâ alphabet. In total, 11 books were published in the Nogai Arabic alphabet in 1926–1928.

== Latinized alphabet ==
In 1928, within the framework of the Soviet project of Latinization, the Nogai alphabet was created on a Latin basis. Its author was Abdul-Khamid Shershenbievich Dzhanibekov, a teacher at the Achikulak secondary school. This alphabet had the following composition:

A a	B ʙ	Ç ç	D d	E e	Ə ə	F f
G g	Ƣ ƣ	I i	K k	L l	M m	N n
Ꞑ ꞑ	O o	Ɵ ɵ	P p	Q q	R r	S s
Ş ş	T t	U u	Y y	J j	Ь ь	Z z
V v

In 1929, the first Nogai primer was published in this alphabet. Later, capital letters were introduced into the alphabet.

In 1931, at the «1st Dagestan Orthography Conference», it was decided to add 6 letters to the Nogai alphabet (C c, I̡ ı̡, F f, H h, X x, Ƶ ƶ). 4 of them (C c, F f, H h, Ƶ ƶ) were introduced to denote sounds in loan words. As a result of this conference, the «Orthography Handbook of Nogai language» was published.

In 1933, at the «2nd Dagestan Orthography Conference», it was decided to introduce the letter Ꞩ ꞩ into the Nogai alphabet to denote the sound /ц/ in borrowings from the Russian language.

In 1935, at a meeting of Nogai workers at the cultural establishment of the Cherkess OK VKP(b), it was recommended to exclude the letters Ç ç, Ə ə, H h, I̡ ı̡ from the alphabet. Soon, at a meeting at the Dagestan Committee of the New Alphabet, where the Nogays of the Cherkess Autonomous Oblast were also present, it was decided to exclude the letters Ç ç, Ə ə, H h, and I̡ ı̡ from the alphabet. At the same time, it was decided to write I i instead of I̡ ı̡; instead of Ə ə – A a (with one exception: ər → er); instead of H h – X x; instead of Ç ç – J j (at the beginning of a word) and Z z (in other cases). Also at this meeting, it was proposed to delete the letters Ꞩ ꞩ, Q q, and Ƣ ƣ from the alphabet and introduce the letter W w, but these proposals were not accepted.

As a result, by 1936 the Nogai alphabet had the following form:

A a	B ʙ	C c	D d	E e	F f	G g	Ƣ ƣ	I i	J j	K k
L l	M m	N n	Ꞑ ꞑ	O o	Ɵ ɵ	P p	Q q	R r	S s	Ş ş
Ꞩ ꞩ	T t	U u	V v	X x	Y y	Z z	Ƶ ƶ	Ь ь

In 1937, a new orthography handbook was expected to be published, taking into account all changes in the alphabet, but it was not published due to the beginning of the transition to Cyrillic writing (the rules were briefly published in 1936 in the newspaper «Kolxoz pravdasь»).

== Writing based on the Cyrillic script ==
At the end of the 1930s, the process of translating scripts into Cyrillic began in the USSR. In 1937, the Central Executive Committee of the Dagestan Autonomous Soviet Socialist Republic adopted a resolution "On the translation of the writing of the Dagestan peoples into Russian graphics." On February 20, 1938, a new Nogai alphabet was published in the «Dagestankaya Pravda» newspaper. It contained all the letters of the Russian alphabet (except Ё ё), as well as the digraphs Гъ гъ, Къ къ, Нъ нъ.

In this version of the alphabet, there were no special characters for displaying specific Nogai sounds /ӧ/ and /ӱ/. To designate them, the following method was used: instead of these sounds, the letters о or у were written, and a soft sign was added at the end of the word: боль /бӧл/, кунь /кӱн/. This shortcoming was noted by the Central Institute of Language and Writing of the USSR. As a result, in the same year, the digraphs оь and уь were introduced into the Nogai alphabet to denote the sounds /ӧ/ and /ӱ/.

In 1944, at a meeting of the Nogai intelligentsia, the digraphs Гъ гъ, Къ къ were excluded from the alphabet as having no phonemic meaning.

The last reform of the Nogai writing took place in 1960, when, as a result of discussions at the Karachay-Cherkessia Research Institute, Language and Literature, the letters Аь аь and Ё ё were added to it. After that, the Nogai alphabet took its present form.

А а	Аь аь	Б б	В в	Г г	Д д	Е е	Ё ё	Ж ж	З з
И и	Й й	К к	Л л	М м	Н н	Нъ нъ	О о	Оь оь	П п
Р р	С с	Т т	У у	Уь уь	Ф ф	Х х	Ц ц	Ч ч	Ш ш
Щ щ	Ъ ъ	Ы ы	Ь ь	Э э	Ю ю	Я я

The result of all the changes in the Nogai Cyrillic alphabet was summed up in the orthography code Ногай литературный тилдинъ орфогафия правилоларынынъ Своды, published in Cherkessk in 1962.

== Alphabet Correspondence Table ==
Cyr.	Yañalif	Arabic script (1927–1928)	Arabic script (1926–1927)	Common Turkic Alphabet	KNAB 1995	IPA	Notes
А а	A a	آ / ئا	ا	A a	A a	[a]	
Аь Аь	Ə ə	ئە	ٴا	Ä ä	Ä ä	[æ]	
Б б	B в	ب	ب	B b	B b	[b]	
B ʙ	V v	و	ۋ	V v, W w	W w	[v], [w]	for sound /v/ found only in Russian loanwords
Г г	G g	گ	گ	G g	G g	[g]	
(Гъ гъ)	Ƣ ƣ	ع	ع	G g, Ğ ğ	G g	[ʁ]	
Д д	D d	د	د	D d	D d	[d]	
Е е	E e, (Je je)	ئی	ە	Ye ye	E e, Je je	[je]	
Ё ё	(Jo jo)	(ࢭجو)	(جو)	Yo yo	Ë ë	[jo]	found only in Russian loanwords
Ж ж	Ƶ ƶ	ژ	ژ	J j	Ž ž	[ʒ]	
(Дж дж)	Ç ç	—	—	C c	Ž ž	[dʒ]	
З з	Z z	ز	ز	Z z	Z z	[z]	
И и	I i, I̡ ı̡	ئىُ	ٴى	İ i	I i	[i]	
Й й	J j	ی / ج	ي / ج	Y y	J j	[j]	
К к	K k	ك	ك	K k	K k	[k]	
(Къ къ)	Q q	ق	ق	Q q	K k	[q]	
Л л	L l	ل	ل	L l	L l	[l]	
М м	M m	م	م	M m	M m	[m]	
Н н	N n	ن	ن	N n	N n	[n]	
Нъ нъ	Ꞑ ꞑ	ڭ	ڭ	Ñ ñ	Ŋ ŋ	[ŋ]	
О о	O o	ࢭئو	و	O o	O o	[o]	
Оь оь	Ɵ ɵ	ئو	ٴو	Ö ö	Ö ö	[œ]	
П п	P p	پ	پ	P p	P p	[p]	
Р р	R r	ر	ر	R r	R r	[r]	
С с	S s	س	س	S s	S s	[s]	
Т т	T t	ت	ت	T t	T t	[t]	
У у	U u	ࢭئۇ	ۇ	U u	U u	[u]	
Уь уь	Y y	ئۇ	ٴۇ	Ü ü	Ü ü	[y]	
Ф ф	F f	ف / پ	ف / پ	F f	F f	[f]	found only in Russian loanwords
Х х	X x, H h	ح	ح	H h	H h	[χ]	
Ц ц	Ꞩ ꞩ	—	—	Ts ts	C c	[t͡s]	found only in Russian loanwords
Ч ч	C c	چ	چ	Ç ç	Č č	[tʃ]	found only in Russian loanwords
Ш ш	Ş ş	ش	ش	Ş ş	Š š	[ʃ]	
Щ щ	—	—	—	Şç şç	Šč šč	[ɕː]	found only in Russian loanwords
Ъ ъ	'	—	—	”	”	[◌.]	found only in digraph (нъ) and Russian loanwords
Ы ы	Ь ь	ࢭئىُ	ى	I ı	Y y	[ɯ]	
Ь ь	—	—	—	’	’	[◌ʲ]	found only in digraphs (аь, оь, уь) and Russian loanwords
Э э	E e	ئی	ە	E e	È è, E e	[e]	
Ю ю	(Ju ju)	(ࢭجۇ)	(جۇ)	Yu yu	Ju ju	[ju]	
Я я	(Ja ja)	(جا)	(جا)	Ya ya	Ja ja	[ja]	
