= Gāf (Persian letter) =

Letter used to represent the /ɡ/ sound in Persian alphabet

- گ

Usage
- Writing system: Arabic script
- Type: Abjad
- Language of origin: Persian language
- Sound values: g
- Alphabetical position: 26

History
Development
D46
  - 𐤊
    - 𐡊
      - 𐢎, 𐢏
        - ك, كـ
          - گ

Other
- Writing direction: Right-to-left

Gāf (گ; Persian: گاف), is the name of different Perso-Arabic letters, all representing /ɡ/. They are all derived from the letter Kāf (ک), with additional diacritics, such as dots and lines. In name and shape, it is a variant of Kāf (ک).

It is also one of the five letters the Persian alphabet added to the Arabic alphabet, which are; Že (ژ), Če (چ), and Gaf (گ), in addition to the obsolete Ve (ڤ). Its numerical value is 5000 (see Abjad numerals), except for the Jawi variant (ݢ) which instead has a value of 6000. There are four forms, each used in different alphabets:

- Gāf (گ) in the Persian alphabet, Tausug written in the Arabic script
- Gāf (ݢ) in the Jawi script
- Gāf (ࢴ or ڮ) in the Pegon script
- Gāf (ګ) in Pashto

== Use in Arabic ==
A non-standard letter to the Arabic alphabet; Gāf (گ) has been traditionally used in Iraq and parts of the Levant for /g/. In Morocco, a similar letter (ݣ) is used. While in other Arabic-speaking countries other letters are used, such as a varitation of Qāf (ق) known as Gāf (ڨ) in Tunisia and Algeria, and any of the standard letters Jīm (ج), Ghayn (غ), or Qāf (ق) elsewhere.

== Variant forms ==
One form of gaf

=== Kāf with line ===
The most common form of Gāf (گ) is based on Kāf (ک) with an additional line. It is rarely used in Modern Standard Arabic (MSA) itself but is used to represent the sound /ɡ/ when writing other languages.

When representing this sound in transliteration of Persian into Hebrew, it is written as Kaf (כ׳) with a geresh.

It is frequently used in Persian, Urdu, Balochi, Sindhi, Kurdish, and is one of four Perso-Arabic letters not found in Arabic. It is also commonly used in Mesopotamian Arabic.

Position in word:	Isolated	Final	Medial	Initial
Naskh glyph form: (Help)	گ	ـگ	ـگـ	گـ
Nastaliq glyph form:	گ	ــــگ	ــــگــــ	گــــ

=== Kāf with ring ===
In Pashto, this letter (ګ) is used for /ɡ/.

Position in word:	Isolated	Final	Medial	Initial
Naskh glyph form: (Help)	ګ	ـګ	ـګـ	ګـ
Nastaliq glyph form:	ګ	ــــګ	ــــګــــ	ګــــ

=== Kāf with single dot above ===
This Gāf (ݢ) is derived from a variant form of Kāf (ک), with the addition of a dot. It's used in the Jawi script to represent /ɡ/.

Position in word:	Isolated	Final	Medial	Initial
Glyph form: (Help)	ݢ	ـݢ	ـݢـ	ݢـ

Unicode includes two forms on this letter: one based on the standard Arabic Kāf (ك), and one based on the variant form (ک). The latter is the preferred form.

Character information
Preview	ڬ		ݢ	
Unicode name	ARABIC LETTER KAF WITH DOT ABOVE		ARABIC LETTER KEHEH WITH DOT ABOVE	
Encodings	decimal	hex	dec	hex
Unicode	1708	U+06AC	1890	U+0762
UTF-8	218 172	DA AC	221 162	DD A2
Numeric character reference	&#1708;	&#x6AC;	&#1890;	&#x762;

=== Kāf with three dots below ===
This letter (ڮ) is derived from a form of Kāf (ك), with the addition of three dots below.

Position in word:	Isolated	Final	Medial	Initial
Glyph form: (Help)	ڮ	ـڮ	ـڮـ	ڮـ

=== Gāf with inverted stroke ===
In Chechen, Kabardian, and Adyghe, the character (ࢰ) is used to spell /kʼ/ or /t͡ʃʼ/.

Position in word:	Isolated	Final	Medial	Initial
Glyph form: (Help)	ࢰ	ـࢰ	ـࢰـ	ࢰـ

=== Kāf with a dot below ===
This letter (ࢴ) is derived from a form of Kāf (ك), with the addition of three a dot below. It's used in the Arwi alphabet for the Tamil language and the Pegon script for Indonesian languages to represent /ɡ/.

Position in word:	Isolated	Final	Medial	Initial
Glyph form: (Help)	ࢴ	ـࢴ	ـࢴـ	ࢴـ

=== Kāf with three dots ===
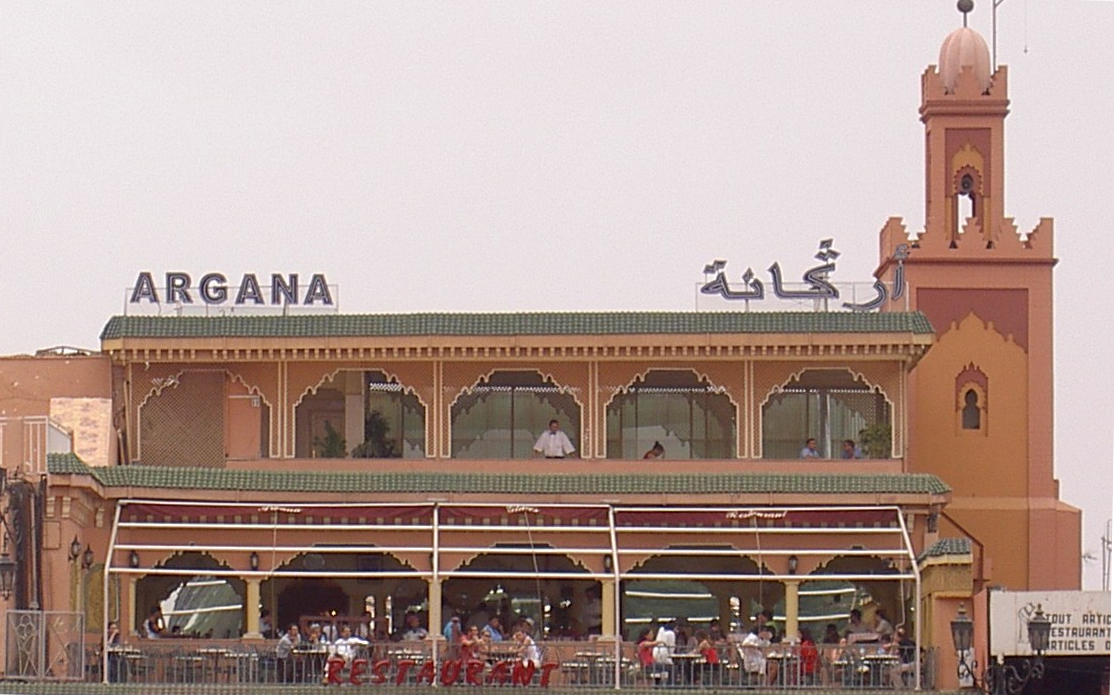
The Arabic signage for the Argana café in Marrakesh's Jemaa el-Fnaa features a prominent Gāf with three dots.

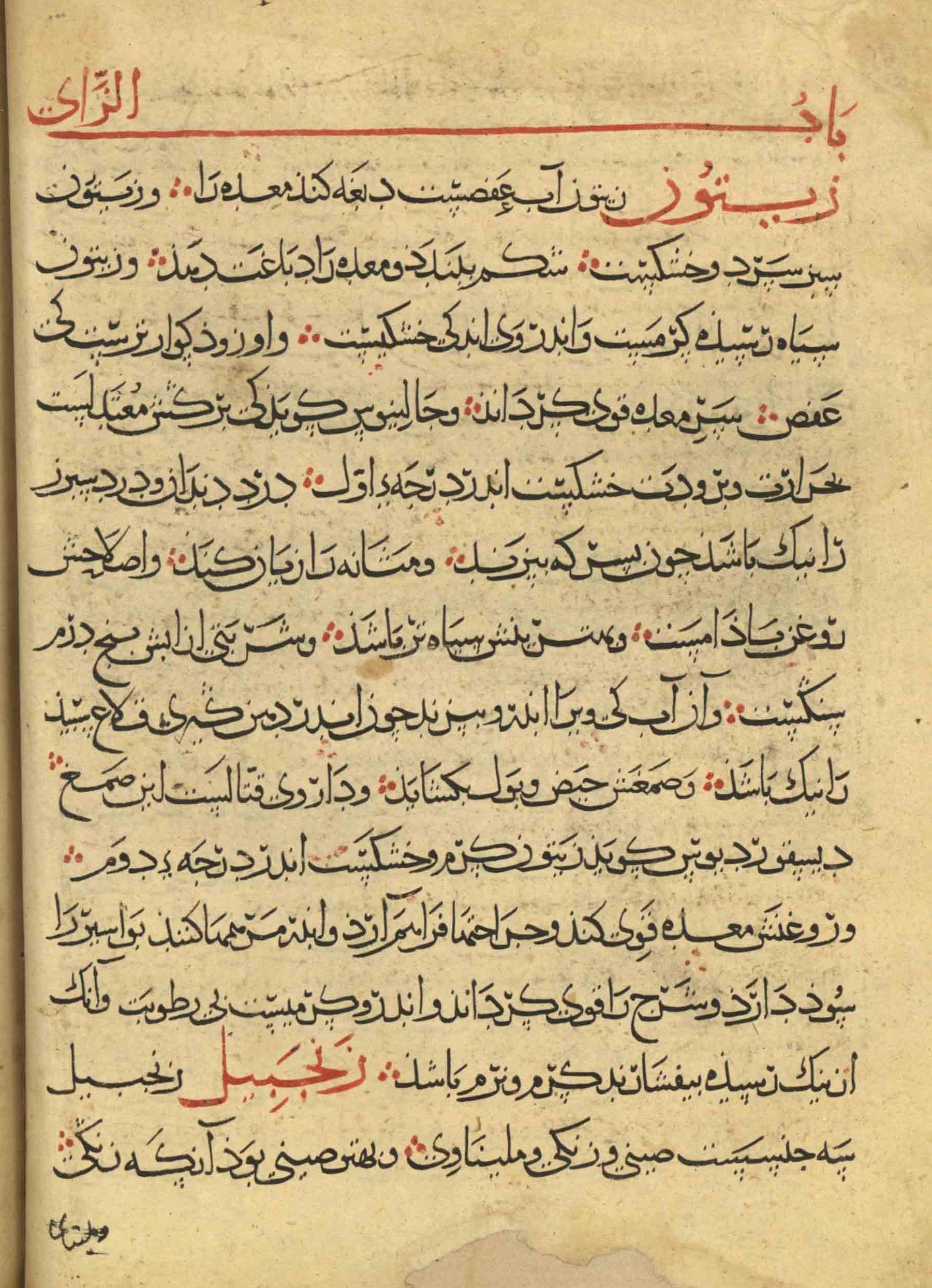
A page from a 12th century Persian manuscript of Kitab al-Abniya 'an Haqa'iq al-Adwiya by Abu Mansur Muwaffaq with letter Gāf written as (ڭـ).

This letter (ڭ) is used in Moroccan Arabic and Arabic-script Berber to represent /ɡ/. Examples of its use include city names (e.g., Agadir: أݣادير) and family names (e.g., El Guerrouj: الݣروج). The preferred form is (ڭ).

Position in word:	Isolated	Final	Medial	Initial
Glyph form: (Help)	ڭ	ـڭ	ـڭـ	ڭـ

It was also used in Ottoman Turkish for /ŋ/. Both forms are based on variant forms of Kāf (ك/ک), with the addition of three dots. The preferred form is (ݣ).

Position in word:	Isolated	Final	Medial	Initial
Glyph form: (Help)	ݣ	ـݣ	ـݣـ	ݣـ

== Character encoding ==
Character information
Preview	ګ		ڬ		ڮ		گ		ࢰ	
Unicode name	ARABIC LETTER KAF WITH RING		ARABIC LETTER KAF WITH DOT ABOVE		ARABIC LETTER KAF WITH THREE DOTS BELOW		ARABIC LETTER GAF		ARABIC LETTER GAF WITH INVERTED STROKE	
Encodings	decimal	hex	dec	hex	dec	hex	dec	hex	dec	hex
Unicode	1707	U+06AB	1708	U+06AC	1710	U+06AE	1711	U+06AF	2224	U+08B0
UTF-8	218 171	DA AB	218 172	DA AC	218 174	DA AE	218 175	DA AF	224 162 176	E0 A2 B0
Numeric character reference	&#1707;	&#x6AB;	&#1708;	&#x6AC;	&#1710;	&#x6AE;	&#1711;	&#x6AF;	&#2224;	&#x8B0;

Character information
Preview	ݢ		ݣ		ڭ		ࢴ	
Unicode name	ARABIC LETTER KEHEH WITH; DOT ABOVE		ARABIC LETTER KEHEH WITH; THREE DOTS ABOVE		ARABIC LETTER NG		ARABIC LETTER KAF WITH; DOT BELOW	
Encodings	decimal	hex	dec	hex	dec	hex	dec	hex
Unicode	1890	U+0762	1891	U+0763	1709	U+06AD	2228	U+08B4
UTF-8	221 162	DD A2	221 163	DD A3	218 173	DA AD	224 162 180	E0 A2 B4
Numeric character reference	&#1890;	&#x762;	&#1891;	&#x763;	&#1709;	&#x6AD;	&#2228;	&#x8B4;

== See also ==
- Če (ﭺ)
- Pe (پ)
- Gāf (ڨ)
- Ve (ڤ)
- Že (ژ)
- Ng (ݣ)
- Gueh (ڳ)
- Ayin (ع)
- Ghayn (غ)
