= Arabic script =

Writing system

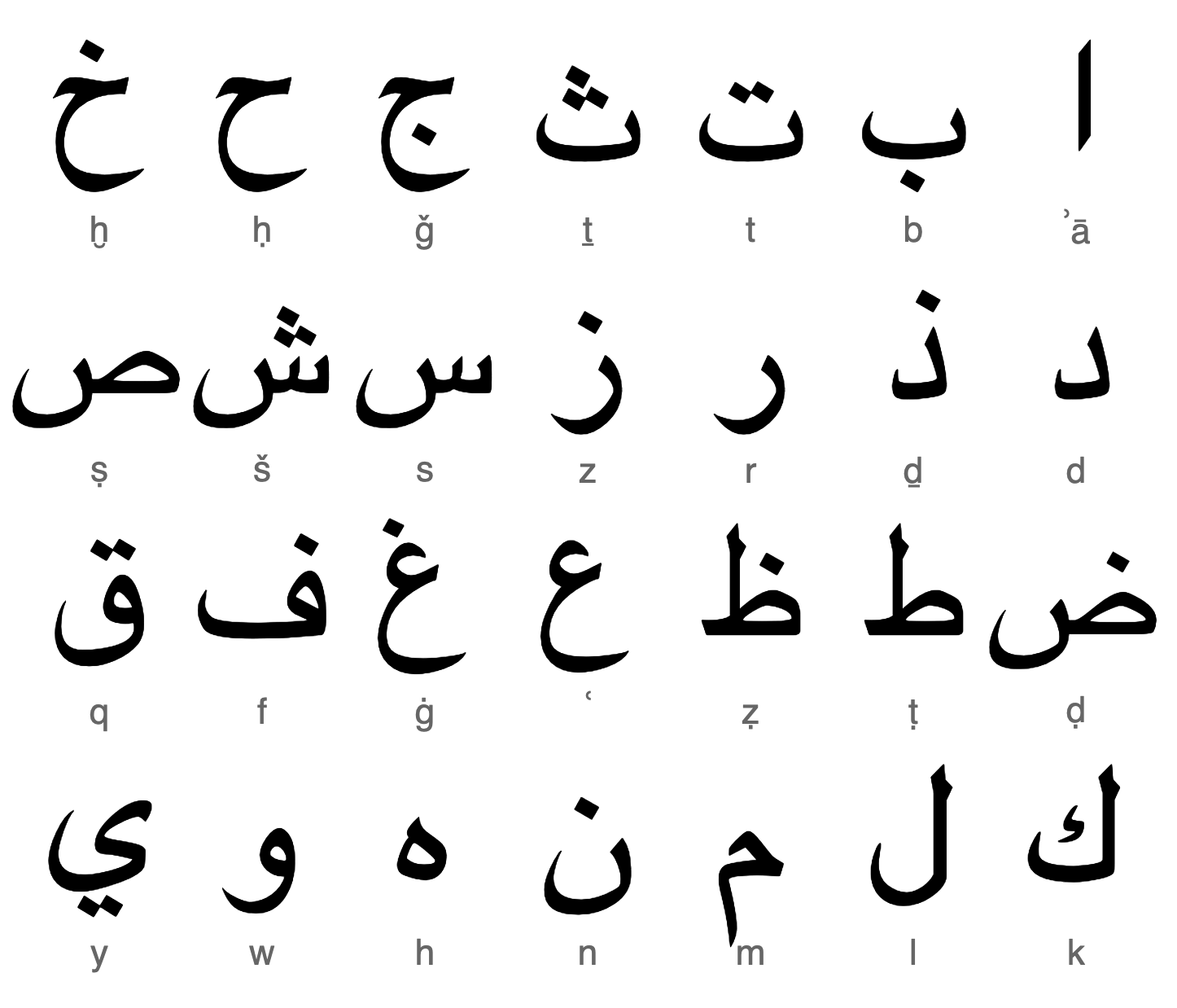
- Script type: Abjad
- Period: 3rd century CE to the present
- Direction: Right-to-left
- Languages: See below

Related scripts
- Parent systems: Egyptian hieroglyphs: Proto-Sinaitic; Phoenician; Aramaic; Nabataean; Arabic script
- Child systems: N'Ko; Hanifi script Thaana (partially)

ISO 15924
- ISO 15924: Arab (160), Arabic

Unicode
- Unicode alias: Arabic
- Unicode range: U+0600–U+06FF Arabic; U+0750–U+077F Arabic Supplement; U+08A0–U+08FF Arabic Extended-A; U+0870–U+089F Arabic Extended-B; U+10EC0–U+10EFF Arabic Extended-C; U+FB50–U+FDFF Arabic Pres. Forms-A; U+FE70–U+FEFF Arabic Pres. Forms-B; U+1EE00–U+1EEFF Arabic Mathematical...; U+1EC70–U+1ECBF Indic Siyaq Numbers; U+1ED00–U+1ED4F Ottoman Siyaq Numbers; U+10E60–U+10E7F Rumi Numeral Symbols

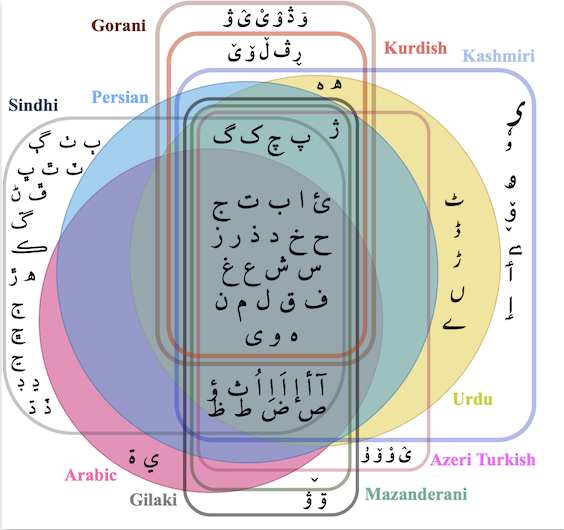
Euler diagram showing major languages and scripts based on the Arabic alphabet, including Arabic, Persian, Kurdish, Kashmiri, Urdu, Sindhi, Gorani, Gilaki, Mazanderani, and Azeri Turkish.

Worldwide use of the Arabic script
Arabic alphabet world distribution
Countries where the Arabic script is:
→	the sole official script
→	official alongside other scripts
→	official at a provincial level (China, India, Tanzania) or a recognized second script of the official language (Malaysia, Tajikistan)

The Arabic script is the writing system used for Arabic (Arabic alphabet) and several other languages of Asia and Africa. It is the second-most widely used alphabetic writing system in the world (after the Latin script), the second-most widely used writing system in the world by number of countries using it, and the third-most by number of users (after the Latin and Chinese scripts).

The script was first used to write texts in Arabic, most notably the Quran, the holy book of Islam. With the religion's spread, it came to be used as the primary script for many language families, leading to the addition of new letters and other symbols. Such languages using it are Arabic, Persian (Farsi and Dari), Urdu, Uyghur, Kurdish, Pashto, Punjabi (Shahmukhi), Sindhi, Azerbaijani (Torki in Iran), Malay (Jawi), Javanese, Sundanese, Madurese and Indonesian (Pegon), Balti, Balochi, Luri, Kashmiri, Cham (Akhar Srak), Rohingya, Somali, Mandinka, and Mooré, among others. Until the 16th century, it was also used for some Spanish texts, and—prior to the script reform in 1928—it was the writing system of Turkish.

The script is written from right to left in a cursive style, in which most of the letters are written in slightly different forms according to whether they stand alone or are joined to a following or preceding letter. The script is unicase and does not have distinct capital or lowercase letters. In most cases, the letters transcribe consonants, or consonants and a few vowels, so most Arabic alphabets are abjads, with the versions used for some languages, such as Sorani dialect of Kurdish, Kashmiri, Gorani, Uyghur and Serbo-Croatian being alphabets, while Mandarin having an abugida where diacritics are showed instead of full letters. It is the basis for the tradition of Arabic calligraphy.

== History ==
The Arabic alphabet is derived either from the Nabataean alphabet or (less widely believed) directly from the Syriac alphabet, which are both derived from the Aramaic alphabet, which, in turn, descended from the Phoenician alphabet. The Phoenician script also gave rise to the Greek alphabet (and, therefore, both the Cyrillic alphabet and the Latin alphabet used in North and South America and most European countries).

=== Origins ===
In the 6th and 5th centuries BCE, northern Arab tribes emigrated and founded a kingdom centred around Petra, Jordan. This people (now named Nabataeans from the name of one of the tribes, Nabatu) spoke Nabataean Arabic, a dialect of the Arabic language. In the 2nd or 1st centuries BCE, the first known records of the Nabataean alphabet were written in the Aramaic language (which was the language of communication and trade), but included some Arabic language features: the Nabataeans did not write the language which they spoke. They wrote in a form of the Aramaic alphabet, which continued to evolve; it separated into two forms: one intended for inscriptions (known as "monumental Nabataean") and the other, more cursive and hurriedly written and with joined letters, for writing on papyrus. This cursive form influenced the monumental form more and more and gradually changed into the Arabic alphabet.

== Overview ==
the Arabic alphabet
خ	ح	ج	ث	ت	ب	ا
khā’	ḥā’	jīm	tha’	tā’	bā’	alif
ص	ش	س	ز	ر	ذ	د
ṣād	shīn	sīn	zāy / zayn	rā’	dhāl	dāl
ق	ف	غ	ع	ظ	ط	ض
qāf	fā’	ghayn	‘ayn	ẓā’	ṭā’	ḍād
ي	و	ه	ن	م	ل	ك
yā’	wāw	hā’	nūn	mīm	lām	kāf
أ	آ	إ	ئ	ؠ	ء	ࢬ
alif hamza↑	alif madda	alif hamza↓	yā’ hamza↑	kashmiri yā’	hamza	rohingya yā’
ى	ٱ	ی	ە	ً	ٌ	ٍ
alif maksura	alif wasla	farsi yā’	ae	fathatan	dammatan	kasratan
َ	ُ	ِ	ّ	ْ	ٓ	ۤ
fatha	damma	kasra	shadda	sukun	maddah	madda
ں	ٹ	ٺ	ٻ	پ	ٿ	ڃ
nūn ghunna	ttā’	ttāhā’	bāā’	pā’	tāhā’	nyā’
ڄ	چ	ڇ	ڈ	ڌ	ڍ	ڎ
dyā’	tchā’	tchahā’	ddāl	dāhāl	ddāhāl	duul
ڑ	ژ	ڤ	ڦ	ک	ڭ	گ
rrā’	jā’	vā’	pāḥā’	kāḥā’	ng	gāf
ڳ	ڻ	ھ	ہ	ة	ۃ	ۅ
gueh	rnūn	hā’ doachashmee	hā’ goal	tā’ marbuta	tā’ marbuta goal	Kirghiz oe
ۆ	ۇ	ۈ	ۉ	ۋ	ې	ے
oe	u	yu	Kirghiz yu	ve	e	yā’ barree
^{(see below for other alphabets)}

The Arabic script has been adapted for use in a wide variety of languages aside from Arabic, including Persian, Malay and Urdu, which are not Semitic. Such adaptations may feature altered or new characters to represent phonemes that do not appear in Arabic phonology. For example, the Arabic language lacks a voiceless bilabial plosive (the [p] sound), therefore many languages add their own letter to represent [p] in the script, though the specific letter used varies from language to language. These modifications tend to fall into groups: Indian and Turkic languages written in the Arabic script tend to use the Persian modified letters, whereas the languages of Indonesia tend to imitate those of Jawi. The modified version of the Arabic script originally devised for use with Persian is known as the Perso-Arabic script by scholars.

When the Arabic script is used to write Serbo-Croatian, Sorani, Kashmiri, Mandarin Chinese, or Uyghur, vowels are mandatory. The Arabic script can, therefore, be used as a true alphabet as well as an abjad, although it is often strongly, if erroneously, connected to the latter due to it being originally used only for Arabic.

Use of the Arabic script in West African languages, especially in the Sahel, developed with the spread of Islam. To a certain degree the style and usage tends to follow those of the Maghreb (for instance the position of the dots in the letters fāʼ and qāf). Additional diacritics have come into use to facilitate the writing of sounds not represented in the Arabic language. The term ʻAjamī, which comes from the Arabic root for "foreign", has been applied to Arabic-based orthographies of African languages.

Wikipedia in Arabic script of five languages

=== Table of writing styles ===
Script or style	Alphabet(s)	Language(s)	Region	Derived from	Comment
Naskh	Arabic, Pashto, & others	Arabic, Pashto, Sindhi, & others	Every region where Arabic scripts are used		Sometimes refers to a very specific calligraphic style, but sometimes used to refer more broadly to almost every font that is not Kufic or Nastaliq.
Nastaliq	Urdu, Shahmukhi, Persian, & others	Urdu, Punjabi, Persian, Kashmiri & others	Southern and Western Asia	Taliq	Used for almost all modern Urdu and Punjabi text, but only occasionally used for Persian. (The term "Nastaliq" is sometimes used by Urdu-speakers to refer to all Perso-Arabic scripts.)
Taliq	Persian	Persian			A predecessor of Nastaliq.
Kufic	Arabic	Arabic	Middle East and parts of North Africa		
Rasm	Restricted Arabic alphabet	Arabic	Mainly historical		Omits all diacritics including i'jam. Digital replication usually requires some special characters. See: ٮ ڡ ٯ (links to Wiktionary).

=== Table of alphabets ===
Alphabet	Letters	Additional Characters	Script or Style	Languages	Region	Derived from: (or related to)	Note
Arabic	28	^(see above)	Naskh, Kufi, Rasm, & others	Arabic	North Africa, West Asia	Phoenician, Aramaic, Nabataean	
Arabic Afrikaans	40	پ ݗ چ ژ ݝ ڠ ڤ گ ء ے	Naskh	Afrikaans	South Africa	Perso-Arabic	
Ajami script	33	ݑ ڟ ڠ ٻ ـٜ ـٰٜ	Naskh, Magherbi	Hausa, Yoruba, Swahili, etc	West Africa, East Africa	Arabic	documented use likely between the 15th to 18th century for Hausa, Mande, Pulaar, Swahili, Wolof, and Yoruba Languages, among other languages.
Aljamiado	28		Maghrebi, Andalusi variant; Kufic	Old Spanish, Andalusi Romance, Ladino, Aragonese, Valencian, Old Galician-Portuguese	Southwest Europe	Arabic	8th–13th centuries for Andalusi Romance, 14th–16th centuries for the other languages
Arebica	30	ڄ ە اٖى ي ڵ ںٛ ۉ ۆ	Naskh	Serbo-Croatian	Southeastern Europe	Perso-Arabic	Latest stage has full vowel marking
Arwi alphabet	41	ڊ ڍ ڔ صٜ ۻ ࢳ ڣ ࢴ ڹ ݧ	Naskh	Tamil	Southern India, Sri Lanka	Perso-Arabic	
Belarusian Arabic alphabet	32	ࢮ ࢯ	Naskh	Belarusian	Eastern Europe	Perso-Arabic	15th / 16th century
Balochi Standard Alphabet(s)	29	ٹ ڈ ۏ ݔ ے	Naskh and Nastaliq	Balochi	South-West Asia	Perso-Arabic, also borrows multiple glyphs from Urdu	This standardization is based on the previous orthography. For more information, see Balochi writing.
Berber Arabic alphabet(s)	33	چ ژ ڞ ݣ ء		Various Berber languages	North Africa	Arabic	
Burushaski	53	ݳ ݴ ݼ څ ڎ ݽ ڞ ݣ ݸ ݹ ݶ ݷ ݺ ݻ (see note)	Nastaliq	Burushaski	South-West Asia (Pakistan)	Urdu	Also uses the additional letters shown for Urdu.^{(see below)} Sometimes written with just the Urdu alphabet, or with the Latin alphabet.
Chagatai alphabet	32	ݣ	Nastaliq and Naskh	Chagatai	Central Asia	Perso-Arabic	ݣ is interchangeable with نگ and ڭ.
Dobrujan Tatar	32		Naskh	Dobrujan Tatar	Southeastern Europe	Chagatai	
Fula	36	ݑ ڨ ج࣫࣪ ٻ ڤ ۑ ـٜ	Naskh	Fula	West Africa	Arabic	A dialect continuum from Senegal to Nigeria and not uniformly standardised. Additional characters are only seen in Pulaar Fouta Djallon and Nigerian Fulfulde varieties.
Galal	32		Naskh	Somali	Horn of Africa	Arabic	
Hausa alphabet	36	ݑ ڟ ڨ ݣ ڭ ڠ ٻ ـٜ	Naskh, Maghrebi	Hausa	West Africa	Arabic	ݑ and ٻ change depending on whether its written in Warsh (Maghrebi) or Hafs (Naskh) convention respectively. Similarly with ݣ and ڭ. In use since the 17th century and generally used in Islamic contexts and by anti-colonial groups.
Jawi	36	چ ڠ ڤ ݢ ڽ ۏ	Naskh	Malay	Peninsular Malaysia, Sumatra and part of Borneo	Arabic	Since 1303 AD (Trengganu Stone)
Kashmiri	44	ۆ ۄ ؠ ێ	Nastaliq	Kashmiri	South Asia	Urdu	This orthography is fully voweled. 3 out of the 4 (ۆ, ۄ, ێ) additional glyphs are actually vowels. Not all vowels are listed here since they are not separate letters. For further information, see Kashmiri writing.
Kazakh Arabic alphabet	35	ٵ ٶ ۇ ٷ ۋ ۆ ە ھ ى ٸ ي	Naskh	Kazakh	Central Asia, China	Chagatai	In use since 11th century, reformed in the early 20th century, now official only in China
Khowar	45	ݯ ݮ څ ځ ݱ ݰ ڵ	Nastaliq	Khowar	South Asia	Urdu, however, borrows multiple glyphs from Pashto	
Kyrgyz Arabic alphabet	33	ۅ ۇ ۉ ۋ ە ى ي	Naskh	Kyrgyz	Central Asia	Chagatai	In use since 11th century, reformed in the early 20th century, now official only in China
Pashto	45	ټ څ ځ ډ ړ ږ ښ ګ ڼ ۀ ي ې ۍ ئ	Naskh and occasionally, Nastaliq	Pashto	South-West Asia, Afghanistan and Pakistan	Perso-Arabic	ګ is interchangeable with گ. Also, the glyphs ی and ې are often replaced with ے in Pakistan.
Pegon script	35	چ ڎ ڟ ڠ ڤ ڮ ۑ	Naskh	Javanese, Sundanese, Madurese	South-East Asia (Indonesia)	Arabic	
Persian	32	پ چ ژ گ	Naskh and Nastaliq	Persian (Farsi)	West Asia (Iran etc. )	Arabic	Also known as Perso-Arabic.
Shahmukhi	41	ݪ ݨ	Nastaliq	Punjabi	South Asia (Pakistan)	Perso-Arabic	
Saraiki	45	ٻ ڄ ݙ ڳ	Nastaliq	Saraiki	South Asia (Pakistan)	Urdu	
Sindhi	52	ڪ ڳ ڱ گ ک پ ڀ ٻ ٽ ٿ ٺ ڻ ڦ ڇ چ ڄ ڃ ھ ڙ ڌ ڏ ڎ ڍ ڊ	Naskh	Sindhi	South Asia (Pakistan)	Perso-Arabic	
Sorabe	28		Naskh	Malagasy	Madagascar	Arabic	
Soranî	33	ڕ ڤ ڵ ۆ ێ	Naskh	Kurdish languages	Middle-East	Perso-Arabic	Vowels are mandatory, i.e. alphabet
Swahili Arabic script	28		Naskh	Swahili	Western and Southern Africa	Arabic	
İske imlâ	35	ۋ	Naskh	Tatar	Volga region	Chagatai	Used prior to 1920.
Ottoman Turkish	32	ﭖ ﭺ ﮊ ﮒ ﯓ ئە		Ottoman Turkish	Ottoman Empire	Chagatai	Official until 1928
Urdu	39+ (see notes)	ٹ ڈ ڑ ں پ ھ چ ژ آ گ ے (see notes)	Nastaliq	Urdu	South Asia	Perso-Arabic	58 letters including digraphs representing aspirated consonants. بھ پھ تھ ٹھ جھ چھ دھ ڈھ کھ گھ
Uyghur	32	ئا ئە ھ ئو ئۇ ئۆ ئۈ ۋ ئې ئى	Naskh	Uyghur	China, Central Asia	Chagatai	Reform of older Arabic-script Uyghur orthography that was used prior to the 1950s. Vowels are mandatory, i.e. alphabet
Wolofal	33	ݖ گ ݧ ݝ ݒ	Naskh	Wolof	West Africa	Arabic, however, borrows at least one glyph from Perso-Arabic	
Xiao'erjing	36	ٿ س﮲ ڞ ي	Naskh	Sinitic languages	China, Central Asia	Chagatai	Used to write Chinese languages by Muslims living in China such as the Hui people.
Yaña imlâ	29	ئا ئە ئی ئو ئۇ ئ ھ	Naskh	Tatar	Volga region	İske imlâ alphabet	1920–1927 replaced with Cyrillic

=== Current use ===
Today Iran, Afghanistan, and Pakistan are the main non-Arabic speaking states using the Arabic alphabet to write one or more official national languages, including Azerbaijani, Baluchi, Brahui, Persian, Pashto, Central Kurdish, Urdu, Sindhi, Kashmiri and Punjabi.

In India and China some regions use the Arabic script to write respectively Kashmiri in Jammu and Kashmir, Urdu in Uttar Pradesh and Telangana, Uyghur in Xinjiang Uygur Autonomous Region

An Arabic alphabet is currently used for the following languages:

==== Africa ====
- North Africa
  - Arabic
  - Berber languages have often been written in an adaptation of the Arabic alphabet. The use of the Arabic alphabet, as well as the competing Latin and Tifinagh scripts, has political connotations
  - Tuareg language, (sometimes called Tamasheq) which is also a Berber language
- Northeast Africa
  - Bedawi or Beja, mainly in northeastern Sudan
  - Wadaad's writing, used in Somalia
  - Nubian languages
    - Dongolawi language or Andaandi language of Nubia, in the Nile Vale of northern Sudan
    - Nobiin language, the largest Nubian language (previously known by the geographic terms Mahas and Fadicca/Fiadicca) is not yet standardized, being written variously in both Latinized and Arabic scripts; also, there have been recent efforts to revive the Old Nubian alphabet.
  - Fur language of Darfur, Sudan
- Southeast Africa
  - Comorian, in the Comoros, currently side by side with the Latin alphabet (neither is official)
  - Swahili, was originally written in Arabic alphabet, Swahili orthography is now based on the Latin alphabet that was introduced by Christian missionaries and colonial administrators
- West Africa
  - Zarma language of the Songhay family. It is the language of the southwestern lobe of the West African nation of Niger, and it is the second leading language of Niger, after Hausa, which is spoken in south central Niger
  - Tadaksahak is a Songhay language spoken by the pastoralist Idaksahak of the Ménaka area of Mali
  - Hausa language uses an adaptation of the Arabic script known as Ajami, for many purposes, especially religious, but including newspapers, mass mobilization posters and public information
  - Dyula language is a Mandé language spoken in Burkina Faso, Côte d'Ivoire and Mali.
  - Jola-Fonyi language of the Casamance region of Senegal
  - Balanta language a Bak language of west Africa spoken by the Balanta people and Balanta-Ganja dialect in Senegal
  - Mandinka, widely but unofficially (known as Ajami), (another non-Latin script used is the N'Ko script)
  - Fula, especially the Pular of Guinea (known as Ajami)
  - Wolof (at zaouia schools), known as Wolofal.
  - Yoruba, earliest attested history of use since 17th century, however earliest verifiable history of use dates to the 19th century. Known as Anjẹmi, it is used in Islamic praise verse, poetry, personal and esoteric use
- Arabic script outside Africa
  - In writings of African American slaves
    - Writings of by Omar Ibn Said (1770–1864) of Senegal
    - The Bilali Document also known as Bilali Muhammad Document is a handwritten, Arabic manuscript on West African Islamic law. It was written by Bilali Mohammet in the 19th century. The document is currently housed in the library at the University of Georgia
    - Letter written by Ayuba Suleiman Diallo (1701–1773)
    - Arabic Text From 1768
    - Letter written by Abdul Rahman Ibrahima Sori (1762–1829)

==== Middle East and Central Asia ====
- Arabic
- Azerbaijani (Torki) in Iran.
- Baluchi in Iran, in Pakistan's Balochistan region, Afghanistan and Oman
- Garshuni (or Karshuni) originated in the 7th century, when Arabic became the dominant spoken language in the Fertile Crescent, but Arabic script was not yet fully developed or widely read, and so the Syriac alphabet was used. There is evidence that writing Arabic in this other set of letters (known as Garshuni) influenced the style of modern Arabic script. After this initial period, Garshuni writing has continued to the present day among some Syriac Christian communities in the Arabic-speaking regions of the Levant and Mesopotamia.
- Kazakh in China, Iran and Afghanistan (Cyrillic in Kazakhstan)
- Kurdish in Northern Iraq and Northwest Iran. (In Turkey and Syria the Latin script is used for Kurdish)
- Kyrgyz by its 150,000 speakers in the Xinjiang Uyghur Autonomous Region in northwestern China, Pakistan and Afghanistan (Cyrillic in Kyrgyzstan)
- Pashto in Afghanistan and Pakistan, and Tajikistan
- Persian in Iranian Persian and Dari in Afghanistan. It had former use in Tajikistan but is no longer used in Standard Tajik
- Southwestern Iranian languages as Lori dialects and Bakhtiari language
- Turkmen in Afghanistan and Iran (Latin in Turkmenistan)
- Uyghur alphabet in China, a fully voweled Arabic script in 1983
- Uzbek in Afghanistan (Latin in Uzbekistan) and China

==== East Asia ====
- The Chinese language is written by some Hui in the Arabic-derived Xiao'erjing alphabet (see also Sini (script))
- The Turkic Salar language is written by some Salar in the Arabic alphabet

==== Europe ====
- Dobrujan Tatar in Romania and Bulgaria

==== South Asia ====
- Balochi in Pakistan and Iran
- Dari in Afghanistan
- Kashmiri in India and Pakistan (also written in Sharada and Devanagari although Kashmiri is more commonly written in Perso-Arabic Script)
- Pashto in Afghanistan and Pakistan
- Khowar in Northern Pakistan, also uses the Latin script
- Punjabi (Shahmukhi) in Pakistan, also written in the Brahmic script known as Gurmukhi in India
- Saraiki, written with a modified Arabic script – that has 45 letters
- Sindhi, a British commissioner in Sindh on August 29, 1857, ordered to change Arabic script, also written in Devanagari in India
- Aer language
- Bhadrawahi language
- Ladakhi (India), although it is more commonly written using the Tibetan script
- Balti (a Sino-Tibetan language), also rarely written in the Tibetan script
- Brahui language in Pakistan and Afghanistan
- Burushaski or Burusho language, a language isolated to Pakistan.
- Urdu in Pakistan and India (and historically several other Hindustani languages). Urdu is the national language of Pakistan and a scheduled language in India. It is also one of several official languages in the Indian states of Jammu and Kashmir, Delhi, Uttar Pradesh, Bihar, Jharkhand, West Bengal and Telangana.
- Dogri, spoken by about five million people in India and Pakistan, chiefly in the Jammu region of Jammu and Kashmir and in Himachal Pradesh, but also in northern Punjab, although Dogri is more commonly written in Devanagari
- Arwi language (a mixture of Arabic and Tamil) uses the Arabic script together with the addition of 13 letters. It is mainly used in Sri Lanka and the South Indian state of Tamil Nadu for religious purposes. Arwi language is the language of Tamil Muslims
- Arabi Malayalam is Malayalam written in the Arabic script. The script has particular letters to represent the peculiar sounds of Malayalam. This script is mainly used in madrasas of the South Indian state of Kerala and of Lakshadweep.
- Rohingya language (Ruáingga) is a language spoken by the Rohingya people of Rakhine State, formerly known as Arakan (Rakhine), Burma (Myanmar). It is similar to Chittagonian language in neighboring Bangladesh and sometimes written using the Roman script, or an Arabic-derived script known as Hanifi
- Ishkashimi language (Ishkashimi) in Afghanistan

==== Southeast Asia ====
- Malay in the Arabic script known as Jawi. In some cases it can be seen in the signboards of shops and market stalls, especially in rural or conservative areas of Malaysia, but it is no longer commonly used for everyday writing, being relegated instead to religious studies. Particularly in Brunei, Jawi is used in terms of writing or reading for Islamic religious educational programs in primary school, secondary school, college, or even higher educational institutes such as universities. In addition, some television programming uses Jawi, such as announcements, advertisements, news, social programs or Islamic programs
  - co-official in Brunei
  - co-official in the Malaysian states of Kelantan, Kedah, Pahang, and Terengganu.
  - Indonesia, Jawi script is co-used with Latin in provinces of Aceh, Riau, Riau Islands and Jambi. The Javanese, Madurese and Sundanese also use another Arabic variant, the Pegon in Islamic writings and pesantren community.
  - Southern Thailand
  - Predominantly Muslim areas of the Philippines (especially Maguindanaon and Tausug)
  - Ida'an language (also Idahan) a Malayo-Polynesian language spoken by the Ida'an people of Sabah, Malaysia
- Cham language in Cambodia and Vietnam besides Western Cham script.

=== Former use ===
With the establishment of Muslim rule in the subcontinent, one or more forms of the Arabic script were incorporated among the assortment of scripts used for writing native languages. In the 20th century, the Arabic script was generally replaced by the Latin alphabet in the Balkans, parts of Sub-Saharan Africa, and Southeast Asia, while in the Soviet Union, after a brief period of Latinisation, use of Cyrillic was mandated. Turkey changed to the Latin alphabet in 1928 as part of an internal Westernizing revolution. After the collapse of the Soviet Union in 1991, many of the Turkic languages of the ex-USSR attempted to follow Turkey's lead and convert to a Turkish-style Latin alphabet. However, renewed use of the Arabic alphabet has occurred to a limited extent in Tajikistan, whose language's close resemblance to Persian allows direct use of publications from Afghanistan and Iran.

==== Middle East ====
- Hebrew was written in Arabic letters in a number of places in the past
- Northern Kurdish in Turkey and Syria was written in Arabic script until 1932, when a modified Kurdish Latin alphabet was introduced by Jaladat Ali Badirkhan in Syria
- Turkish in the Ottoman Empire was written in Arabic script until Mustafa Kemal Atatürk declared the change to Latin script in 1928. This form of Turkish is now known as Ottoman Turkish and is held by many to be a different language, due to its much higher percentage of Persian and Arabic loanwords (Ottoman Turkish alphabet)

==== Africa ====
- Afrikaans (as it was first written among the "Cape Malays", see Arabic Afrikaans)
- Berber in North Africa, particularly Shilha in Morocco (still being considered, along with Tifinagh and Latin, for Central Atlas Tamazight)
- French by the Arabs and Berbers in Algeria and other parts of North Africa during the French colonial period
- Harari, by the Harari people of the Harari Region in Ethiopia. Now uses the Geʻez and Latin alphabets
- For the West African languages—Hausa, Fula, Mandinka, Wolof and others—the Latin alphabet has officially replaced Arabic transcriptions for use in literacy and education
- Kinyarwanda in Rwanda
- Kirundi in Burundi
- Malagasy in Madagascar (script known as Sorabe)
- Nubian
- Shona in Zimbabwe
- Somali (see wadaad's Arabic) has mostly used the Latin alphabet since 1972
- Songhay in West Africa, particularly in Timbuktu
- Swahili (has used the Latin alphabet since the 19th century)
- Yoruba in West Africa

==== Europe ====
- Albanian called Elifbaja shqip
- Aljamiado (Mozarabic, Berber, Aragonese, Portuguese, Ladino, and Spanish, during and residually after the Muslim rule in the Iberian peninsula)
- Belarusian (among ethnic Tatars; see Belarusian Arabic alphabet)
- Bosnian (only for literary purposes; currently written in the Latin alphabet; Text example: مۉلٖىمۉ سه ته‌بٖى بۉژه = Molimo se tebi, Bože (We pray to you, O God); see Arebica)
- Crimean Tatar
- Greek in certain areas in Greece and Anatolia. In particular, Cappadocian Greek written in Perso-Arabic
- Polish (among ethnic Lipka Tatars)

==== Central Asia and Caucasus ====
- Adyghe language also known as West Circassian, is an official languages of the Republic of Adygea in the Russian Federation. It used Arabic alphabet before 1927
- Avar as well as other languages of Daghestan: Nogai, Kumyk, Lezgian, Lak and Dargwa
- Azeri in Azerbaijan (now written in the Latin alphabet and Cyrillic script in Azerbaijan)
- Bashkir (officially for some years from the October Revolution of 1917 until 1928, changed to Latin, now uses the Cyrillic script)
- Chaghatay across Central Asia
- Chechen (sporadically from the adoption of Islam; officially from 1917 until 1928)
- Circassian and some other members of the Abkhaz–Adyghe family in the western Caucasus and sporadically – in the countries of Middle East, like Syria
- Ingush
- Karachay-Balkar in the central Caucasus
- Karakalpak
- Kazakh in Kazakhstan (until the 1930s, changed to Latin, currently using Cyrillic, phasing in Latin)
- Kyrgyz in Kyrgyzstan (until the 1930s, changed to Latin, now uses the Cyrillic script)
- Mandarin Chinese and Dungan, among the Hui people (script known as Xiao'erjing)
- Ottoman Turkish
- Tat in South-Eastern Caucasus
- Tatar before 1928 (changed to Latin Yañalif), reformed in the 1880s (İske imlâ), 1918 (Yaña imlâ – with the omission of some letters)
- Turkmen in Turkmenistan (changed to Latin in 1929, then to the Cyrillic script, then back to Latin in 1991)
- Uzbek in Uzbekistan (changed to Latin, then to the Cyrillic script, then back to Latin in 1991)
- Some Northeast Caucasian languages of the Muslim peoples of the USSR between 1918 and 1928 (many also earlier), including Chechen, Lak, etc. After 1928, their script became Latin, then later Cyrillic

==== South and Southeast Asia ====
- Acehnese in Sumatra, Indonesia
- Assamese in Assam, India
- Banjarese in Kalimantan, Indonesia
- Bengali in Bengal, Arabic scripts have been used historically in Bengali literature. See Dobhashi for further information.
- Maguindanaon in the Philippines
- Malay in Malaysia, Singapore and Indonesia. Although Malay speakers in Brunei and Southern Thailand still use the script on a daily basis
- Minangkabau in Sumatra, Indonesia
- Pegon script of Javanese, Madurese and Sundanese in Indonesia, used only in Islamic schools and institutions
- Tausug in the Philippines, Malaysia, and Indonesia it can be used in Islamic schools in the Philippines
- Ternate-Tidore in Maluku, Indonesia
- Wolio in Buton, Indonesia
- Yakan practiced in Islamic schools in Basilan

== Unicode ==
As of Unicode 18.0, the following ranges encode Arabic characters:

- Arabic (0600–06FF)
- Arabic Supplement (0750–077F)
- Arabic Extended-A (08A0–08FF)
- Arabic Extended-B (0870–089F)
- Arabic Extended-C (10EC0–10EFF)
- Arabic Presentation Forms-A (FB50–FDFF)
- Arabic Presentation Forms-B (FE70–FEFF)
- Arabic Mathematical Alphabetic Symbols (1EE00–1EEFF)
- Rumi Numeral Symbols (10E60–10E7F)
- Indic Siyaq Numbers (1EC70–1ECBF)
- Ottoman Siyaq Numbers (1ED00–1ED4F)

== Additional letters used in other languages ==
=== Assignment of phonemes to graphemes ===
∅ = phoneme absent from language

Language family	Austron.		Dravid.	Turkic				Indo-European							Niger–Con.
Language/script	Pegon	Jawi	Arwi	Azeri	Kazakh	Uyghur	Uzbek	Sindhi	Punjabi	Urdu	Persian	Pashto (Note: Broadly speaking, there are two standards for Pashto orthography: the Afghan orthography in Afghanistan and the Peshawar orthography in Pakistan, where /g/ in the latter is represented by ګ instead of the Afghani گ.)	Balochi	Kurdish	Swahili
/t͡ʃ/	چ														
/ʒ/	∅			ژ											
/p/	ڤ		ڣ	پ											
/g/	ؼ	ݢ	ࢴ	ق	گ										ڠ
/v/	∅	ۏ	و		ۆ	ۋ	و					∅		ڤ	
/ŋ/	ڠ		ࢳ	∅	ڭ		نگ	ڱ	ن		∅				نݝ
/ɲ/	ۑ	ڽ	ݧ	∅				ڃ	ن		∅				نْي
/ɳ/	∅		ڹ	∅				ڻ	ݨ	ن	∅	ڼ	∅		

=== Table of additional letters in other languages ===
Letter (Note: letter or digraph)	Use & Pronunciation	Unicode	i'jam & other additions				Shape	Similar Arabic Letter(s)
Letter	Use & Pronunciation	U+	(Note: Joined to the letter, closest to the letter, on the first letter, or above.)	(Note: Further away from the letter, or on the second letter, or below.)	above	below	Shape	Similar Arabic Letter(s)
Additional letters with additional marks
پ	Pe, used to represent the phoneme /p/ in Persian, Pashto, Punjabi, Khowar, Sindhi, Urdu, Kurdish, Kashmiri; it can be used in Arabic to describe the phoneme /p/ otherwise it is written ب /b/.	U+067E	﮹		none	3 dots	ٮ	ب
ݐ	used to represent the equivalent of the Latin letter Ƴ (glottalic palatal approximant /ˀj/) in some African languages such as Fulfulde.	U+0750	﮳﮳﮳		none	3 dots (horizontal)	ٮ	ب
ٻ	B̤ē, used to represent a voiced bilabial implosive /ɓ/ in Hausa, Sindhi and Saraiki.	U+067B	﮾		none	2 dots (vertically)	ٮ	ب
ڀ	represents an aspirated voiced bilabial plosive /bʱ/ in Sindhi.	U+0680	﮻		none	4 dots	ٮ	ب
ٺ	Ṭhē, represents the aspirated voiceless retroflex plosive /ʈʰ/ in Sindhi.	U+067A	﮽		2 dots (vertically)	none	ٮ	ت
ټ	Ṭē, used to represent the phoneme /ʈ/ in Pashto.	U+067C	﮿	﮴	2 dots	ring	ٮ	ت
ٽ	Ṭe, used to represent the phoneme (a voiceless retroflex plosive /ʈ/) in Sindhi	U+067D	﮸		3 dots (inverted)	none	ٮ	ت
ﭦ	Ṭe, used to represent Ṭ (a voiceless retroflex plosive /ʈ/) in Punjabi, Kashmiri, Urdu.	U+0679	◌ؕ		small ط	none	ٮ	ت
ٿ	Teheh, used in Sindhi and Rajasthani (when written in Sindhi alphabet); used to represent the phoneme /t͡ɕʰ/ (pinyin q) in Chinese Xiao'erjing.	U+067F	﮺		4 dots	none	ٮ	ت
ڄ	represents the "c" voiceless dental sibilant affricate /t͡s/ phoneme in Bosnian	U+0684	﮾		none	2 dots (vertically)	ح	ج
ڃ	represents the "ć" voiceless alveolo-palatal affricate /t͡ɕ/ phoneme in Bosnian. Also represents the "NJ" voiced palatal nasal /ɲ/ in Sindhi.	U+0683	﮵		none	2 dots	ح	ج
چ	Che, used to represent /t͡ʃ/ ("ch"). It is used in Persian, Pashto, Punjabi, Urdu, Kashmiri and Kurdish. /ʒ/ in Egypt.	U+0686	﮹		none	3 dots	ح	ج
څ	Ce, used to represent the phoneme /t͡s/ in Pashto.	U+0685	﮶		3 dots	none	ح	خ
ݗ	represents the "đ" voiced alveolo-palatal affricate /d͡ʑ/ phoneme in Bosnian. Also used to represent the letter X in Afrikaans.	U+0757	﮴		2 dots	none	ح	خ
ځ	Źim, used to represent the phoneme /d͡z/ in Pashto.	U+0681	◌ٔ		Hamza	none	ح	خ
ڎ	Dha, to represent the phoneme /ɖ/ in Somali and in the Pegon script. Also used to represent the phoneme /ʈ͡ʂ/ in Burushaski.	U+068E	﮶		3 dots	none	د	د
ݙ	used in Saraiki to represent a Voiced retroflex implosive /ᶑ/.	U+0759	﯀	﮾	small ط	2 dots (vertically)	د	د
ڊ	used in Sindhi to represent a Voiced alveolar implosive /ᶑ/.	U+068A	﮳		none	1 dot	د	د
ڈ	Ḍal, used to represent a Ḍ (a voiced retroflex plosive /ɖ/) in Punjabi, Kashmiri and Urdu.	U+0688	◌ؕ		small ط	none	د	د
ڌ	Dhal, used to represent the phoneme /d̪ʱ/ in Sindhi	U+068C	﮴		2 dots	none	د	د
ډ	Ḍal, used to represent the phoneme /ɖ/ in Pashto.	U+0689	﮿		none	ring	د	د
ڑ	Ṛe, represents a retroflex flap /ɽ/ in Punjabi and Urdu.	U+0691	◌ؕ		small ط	none	ر	ر
ړ	Ṛe, used to represent a retroflex lateral flap /𝼈/ in Pashto.	U+0693	﮿		none	ring	ر	ر
ݫ	used in Ormuri to represent a voiced alveolo-palatal fricative /ʑ/, as well as in Torwali.	U+076B	﮽		2 dots (vertically)	none	ر	ر
ژ	Že / zhe, used to represent the voiced postalveolar fricative /ʒ/ in, Persian, Pashto, Kurdish, Urdu, Punjabi and Uyghur.	U+0698	﮶		3 dots	none	ر	ز
ږ	Ǵe / ẓ̌e, used to represent the phoneme /ʐ/ /ɡ/ /ʝ/ in Pashto.	U+0696	﮲	﮳	1 dot	1 dot	ر	ز
ڕ	used in Kurdish to represent rr /r/ in Soranî dialect.	U+0695	ٚ		none	V pointing down	ر	ر
ݭ	used in Kalami to represent a voiceless retroflex fricative /ʂ/, and in Ormuri to represent a voiceless alveolo-palatal fricative /ɕ/.	U+076D	﮽		2 dots vertically	none	س	س
ݜ	used in Shina to represent a voiceless retroflex fricative /ʂ/.	U+075C	﮺		4 dots	none	س	ش
ښ	X̌īn / ṣ̌īn, used to represent the phoneme /x/ /ʂ/ /ç/ in Pashto.	U+069A	﮲	﮳	1 dot	1 dot	س	س
ڜ	Used in Wakhi to represent the phoneme /ʂ/.	U+069C	﮶	﮹	3 dots	3 dots	س	ش
ڞ	Used to represent the phoneme /tsʰ/ (pinyin c) in Chinese.	U+069E	﮶		3 dots	none	ص	ض
ڠ	Nga /ŋ/ in the Jawi script and Pegon script.	U+06A0	﮶		3 dots	none	ع	غ
ڤ	Ve, used in Kurdish to represent /v/, it can be used in Arabic to describe the phoneme /v/ otherwise it is written ف /f/. Pa, used in the Jawi script and Pegon script to represent /p/.	U+06A4	﮶		3 dots	none	ڡ	ف
ڥ	A Maghrebi variant for ڤ in Arabic script to represent the sound /v/ if needed.	U+06A5	﮹		none	3 dots	ڡ	ف
ڨ	A qāf ق with three dots, used to represent the voiced velar plosive /ɡ/ in Algerian and Tunisian. Has no Arabic name.	U+06A8	﮶		3 dots	none	ٯ	ق
ڭ	Ng, used to represent the /ŋ/ phone in Ottoman Turkish, Kazakh, Kyrgyz, and Uyghur Used to represent /ɡ/ in Morocco.	U+06AD	﮶		3 dots	none	ك	ك
ڬ	Gaf, represents a voiced velar plosive /ɡ/ in the Jawi script of Malay.	U+06AC	﮲		1 dot	none	ك	ك
ݢ	Gaf, represents a voiced velar plosive /ɡ/ in the Jawi script of Malay.	U+0762	﮲		1 dot	none	ک	ك
گ	Gaf, represents a voiced velar plosive /ɡ/ in Persian, Pashto, Punjabi, Somali, Kyrgyz, Kazakh, Kurdish, Uyghur, Mesopotamian Arabic, Urdu, Ottoman Turkish, and one Berber variant in Arabic script for /ɡ/.	U+06AF	line		horizontal line	none	ک	ك
ګ	Gaf, used to represent the phoneme /ɡ/ in Pashto.	U+06AB	﮿		ring	none	ک	ك
ؼ	Gaf, represents a voiced velar plosive /ɡ/ in the Pegon script of Indonesian.	U+08B4	﮳		none	3 dots	ک	ك
ڱ	represents the Velar nasal /ŋ/ phoneme in Sindhi.	U+06B1	﮴		2 dots + horizontal line	none	ک	ك
ڳ	represents a voiced velar implosive /ɠ/ in Sindhi and Saraiki	U+06B1	﮾		horizontal line	2 dots	ک	ك
ݣ	used to represent the phoneme /ŋ/ (pinyin ng) in Chinese, one Berber variant in Arabic script or Moroccan Arabic for /ɡ/.	U+0763	﮹		none	3 dots	ک	ك
ݪ	used in Marwari to represent a retroflex lateral flap /𝼈/, and in Kalami to represent a voiceless lateral fricative /ɬ/.	U+076A	line		horizontal line	none	ل	ل
ࣇ	ࣇ – or alternately typeset as لؕ – is used in Punjabi to represent voiced retroflex lateral approximant /ɭ/	U+08C7	◌ؕ		small ط	none	ل	ل
لؕ	ࣇ – or alternately typeset as لؕ – is used in Punjabi to represent voiced retroflex lateral approximant /ɭ/	U+0644 U+0615	◌ؕ		small ط	none	ل	ل
ڵ	used in Kurdish to represent ll /ɫ/ in Soranî dialect. Represents the "lj" palatal lateral approximant /ʎ/ phoneme in Bosnian.	U+06B5	◌ٚ		V pointing down	none	ل	ل
ڼ	represents the retroflex nasal /ɳ/ phoneme in Pashto.	U+06BC	﮲	﮿	1 dot	ring	ں	ن
ڻ	represents the retroflex nasal /ɳ/ phoneme in Sindhi.	U+06BB	◌ؕ		small ط	none	ں	ن
ݨ	used in Punjabi to represent /ɳ/ and Saraiki to represent /ɲ/.	U+0768	﮲	﯀	1 dot + small ط	none	ں	ن
ڽ	Nya /ɲ/ in the Jawi script ڽـ ـڽـ ڽ., The isolated ڽ and final ـڽ resemble the form ڽ, while the initial ڽـ and medial forms ـڽـ, resemble the form پ.	U+06BD	﮶		3 dots	none	ں	ن
ݩ	represents the "nj" palatal nasal /ɲ/ phoneme in Bosnian.	U+0769	﮲	◌ٚ	1 dot V pointing down	none	ں	ن
ۅ	Ö, used to represent the phoneme /ø/ in Kyrgyz.	U+0624	◌̵		Strikethrough (Note: A variant that end up with loop also exists.)	none	و	و
ﻭٓ	Uu, used to represent the phoneme /uː/ in Somali.	ﻭ + ◌ٓ U+0648 U+0653	◌ٓ		Madda	none	و	ﻭ + ◌ٓ
ۏ	Va in the Jawi script.	U+06CF	﮲		1 dot	none	و	و
ۋ	represents a /v/ in Kyrgyz, Uyghur, and Old Tatar; and /w, ʊw, ʉw/ in Kazakh; also formerly used in Nogai.	U+06CB	﮶		3 dots	none	و	و
ۆ	represents "o" /oː/ in Kurdish, "ü" /y/ in Azerbaijani, and /ø/ in Uyghur as part of the digraph ئۆ. It represents the "u" /u/ phoneme in Bosnian.	U+06C6	◌ٚ		V pointing down	none	و	و
ۇ	U, used to represents the /u/ phoneme in Azerbaijani, Kazakh, Kyrgyz and Uyghur.	U+06C7	◌ُ		Damma (Note: Although the letter also known as Waw with Damma, some publications and fonts features filled Damma that looks similar to comma.)	none	و	و
ۉ	represents the "o" /ɔ/ phoneme in Bosnian. Also used to represent /ø/ in Kyrgyz.	U+06C9	◌ٛ		V pointing up	none	و	و
ىٓ	Ii, used to represent the phoneme /iː/ in Somali and Saraiki.	U+0649 U+0653	◌ٓ		Madda	none	ى	ي
ې	Pasta Ye, used to represent the phoneme /e/ in Pashto and Uyghur.	U+06D0	﮾		none	2 dots vertical	ى	ي
ۍ	X̌əźīna ye Ye, used to represent the phoneme [əi] in Pashto.	U+06CD	line		horizontal line	none	ى	ي
ۑ	Nya /ɲ/ in the Pegon script.	U+06D1	﮹		none	3 dots	ى	ي
ێ	represents ê /eː/ in Kurdish.	U+06CE	◌ٚ		V pointing down	2 dots (start + mid)	ى	ي
Additional letters with shape alteration
ک	Khē, represents /kʰ/ in Sindhi.	U+06A9	none		none	none	ک	ك
ڪ	"Swash kāf" is a stylistic variant of ك in Arabic, but represents un- aspirated /k/ in Sindhi.	U+06AA	none		none	none	ڪ	ك
ھ ھ	Do-chashmi he (two-eyed hāʼ), used in digraphs for aspiration /ʰ/ and breathy voice /ʱ/ in Punjabi and Urdu. Also used to represent /h/ in Kazakh, Sorani and Uyghur. (Note: Shown in Naskh (top) and Nastaliq (bottom) styles. The Nastaliq version of the connected forms are connected to each other, because the tatweel character U+0640 used to show the other forms does not work in many Nastaliq fonts.)	U+06BE	none		none	none	ھ	ه / هـ
ە	Ae, used represent /æ/ and /ɛ/ in Kazakh, Sorani and Uyghur.	U+06D5	none		none	none	ه	ه / هـ
ے	Baṛī ye ('big yāʼ'), is a stylistic variant of ي in Arabic, but represents "ai" or "e" /ɛː/, /eː/ in Urdu and Punjabi.	U+06D2	none		none	none	ے	ي
Additional Digraph letters
أو	Oo, used to represent the phoneme /oː/ in Somali.	U+0623 U+0648	◌ٔ		Hamza	none	او	أ + و
اٖى	represents the "i" /i/ phoneme in Bosnian.	U+0627 U+0656 U+0649	◌ٖ		Alef	none	اى	اٖ + ى
أي	Ee, used to represent the phoneme /eː/ in Somali.	U+0623 U+064A	◌ٔ	﮵	Hamza	2 dots	اى	أ + ي

== Letter construction ==
Most languages that use alphabets based on the Arabic alphabet use the same base shapes. Most additional letters in languages that use alphabets based on the Arabic alphabet are built by adding (or removing) diacritics to existing Arabic letters. Some stylistic variants in Arabic have distinct meanings in other languages. For example, variant forms of kāf ك ک ڪ are used in some languages and sometimes have specific usages. In Urdu and some neighbouring languages, the letter Hā has diverged into two forms ھ dō-čašmī hē and ہ ہـ ـہـ ـہ gōl hē, while a variant form of ي yā referred to as baṛī yē ے is used at the end of some words.

== See also ==
- Arabic (Unicode block)
- Arabic typography
- Eastern Arabic numerals (digit shapes commonly used with Arabic script)
- History of the Arabic alphabet
- Transliteration of Arabic
- Xiao'erjing
