= Berber Arabic alphabet =

Arabic-based alphabet used for Berber languages

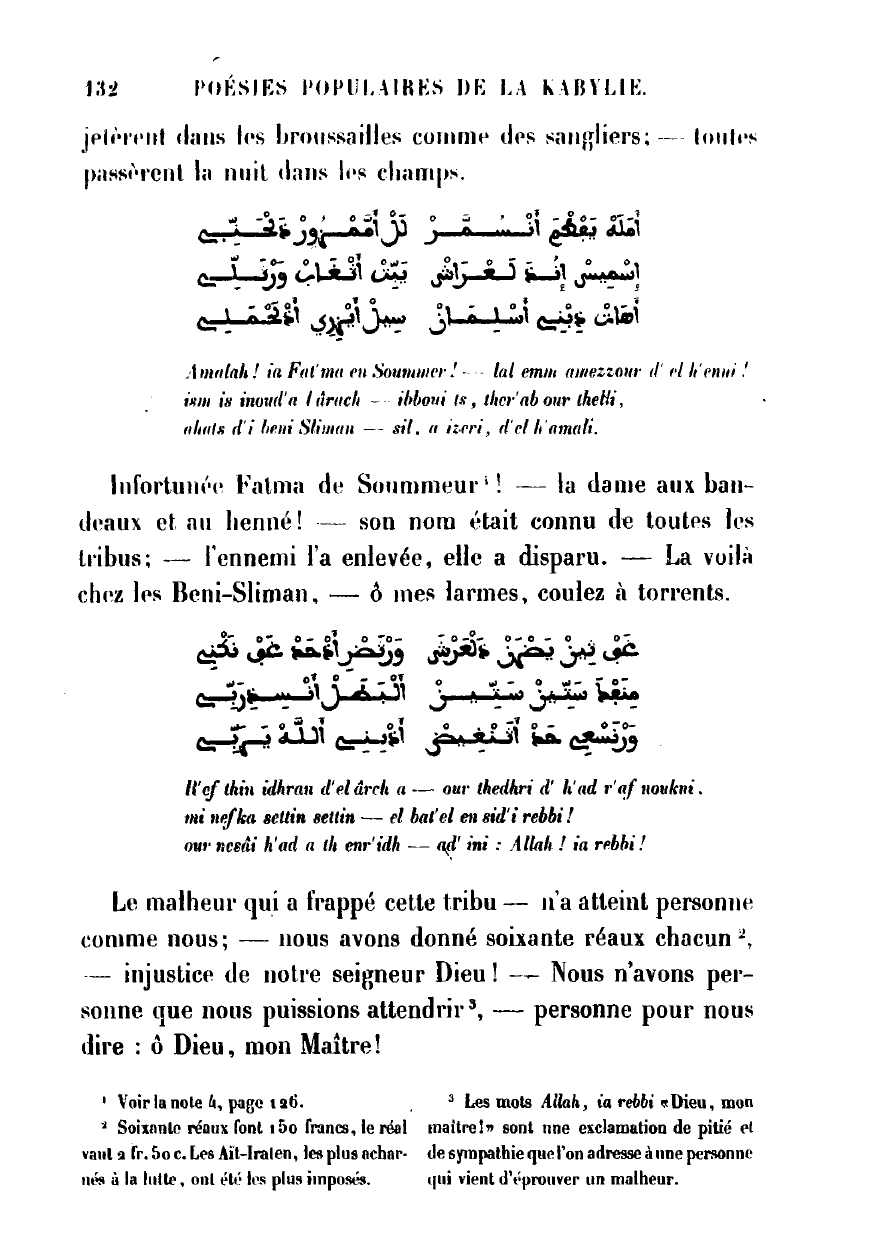
Berber language poetry in Arabic script with its translation in French

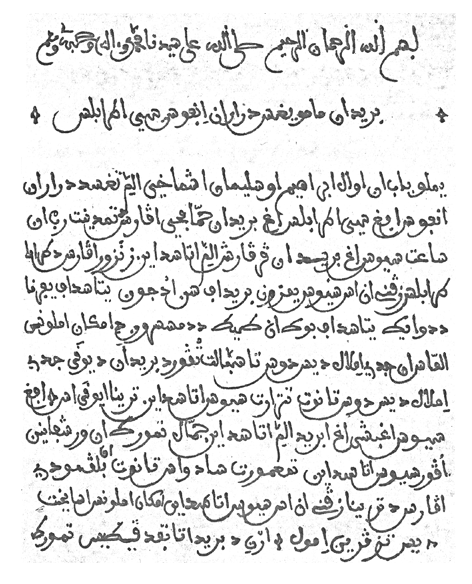
Document in Berber language of Jebel Nefousa - Libya

The Berber Arabic alphabet (Berber languages: اݣماي امزغ اعرب or اڨماي امزيغ اعراب or ءاݣماي ءامازيغ ءعراب; Arabic: الأبجدية العربية الأمازيغية) is an Arabic-based alphabet that was used to write various Berber languages in the Middle Ages. Nowadays users have largely reverted to either the Tifinagh alphabet in Morocco, or Berber Latin alphabet in Algeria.

== History ==
The Arabic alphabet entered the Maghreb with the Muslim conquest of the Maghreb, thanks to the establishment of Quranic schools. Numerous writings on theology, jurisprudence, and science were published and translated into Berber, with different spellings depending on the author. The regions that most used the script, namely Kabylia (يگواون), Souss (سوس), and Mzab (الواد نمزاب or الواد نمڞاب), were the regions that most used this alphabet: the former (Kabylia) thanks to the networks of Sufi Zaouïas, the latter because of the Almoravid heritage, and the latter because of the Rostemids. A consistent orthography was used in the few Berber texts extant from the 11th to the 14th centuries CE. These were written in an older Berber language likely to be most closely related to Tashelhiyt. The consonant 'g' was written with jīm (ج) or kāf (ک), ẓ with ṣād (ص) or sometimes zāy (ز) and ḍ with ṭāʼ (ط), then, these letters evolved, the sound /g/ was transcribed according to the regions as a ک in Morocco, a غ on the highlands and a ق in the central and eastern Maghreb, then these letters evolved into ݣ, ڠ and ڨ to transcribe this sound, similarly the sound /zˁ/ was transcribed as ض which evolved into ڞ. The vowels a, i, u were written as orthographically long vowels ‹ā›, ‹ī›, ‹ū›. Word-final wāw was usually accompanied by alif al-wiqāyah (وا). The vowel signs fatḥah or kasrah represent a phonemic shwa /ə/ that was lost in the post-medieval language, e.g. tuwərmin ‹tūwarmīn› (تووَرمين) 'joints, articulation'. Labialization can be represented by ḍammah, e.g. tagʷərsa ‹tāgursā› (تاكُرسا) 'ploughshare'. Prepositions, possessive complements and the like are usually written as separate words. Medieval texts exhibit many archaisms in phonology, morphology, and lexicon.

Because of French colonization, many writings were burned, Zaouïas closed, and a francization of territory with the compulsory schooling of 1882–1883. General Adolphe Hanoteau proposes a spelling in Latin alphabet, but incomplete, the linguist René Basset publishes in Manuel de la langue kabyle a detailed Arabic alphabet but which does not contain the sounds [e], [rˤ] and [zˤ], more or less important in the language, which some write ⟨ء⟩, ⟨ڒ⟩ and ⟨ظ⟩. Since the beginning of the literary renaissance of Berber, notably with Mouloud Mammeri and Bélaïd Aït Ali, writers agree to say that the Latin alphabet is more in conformity with the language, to follow "technological evolution and to bring Berber into it". From independence in 1962, a policy of Arabization was implemented, and all alphabets were banned for writing Tamazight. Berberophile youth began to firmly reject the Arabic alphabet, which the Berber identity far-right (or the most purist) would describe as an "Arab-Islamic policy to erase Berber". Some North African state policies imposed the Arabic script over other scripts suggested by Berber groups; this was perceived as Arab colonialism replacing the former French colonialism. Amazigh activists, however, avoid the Arabic script, which is generally unpopular among Berbers who believe it is symptomatic of the pan-Arabist views of North African governments. In 1995, the High Commission for Amazighness (HCA) officially adopted the Latin alphabet. In our time, writing Berber with the Arabic abjad is controversial and taboo, particularly because Islamists more or less prefer the Arabic abjad to write Tamazight, following the examples of Wolof, Uyghur, Persian, etc., and this is also one reason why the HCA adopted the Latin alphabet. In any case, the Arabic alphabet is used in primary and secondary school textbooks for beginners who have difficulty reading in ABL.

In Morocco, colonization was much later, but the Zenata tribes of the Rif and the Middle Atlas did not have a written tradition; they were a nomadic people with a pastoral lifestyle. But the Souss and Anti-Atlas region was inhabited by the Masmoudas (مصموده) tribe, who speak Shilha, and these regions are among the rare Berber regions where a written tradition is (almost) solid, thus, the breath of Berber identity claims did not really sweep the region, and did not experience any expression of interest when the Moroccan government announced that Tamazight would be written with Tifinagh.

== Spelling and codification ==
Throughout history, the Arab-Berber alphabet was never codified, and scribes used Arabic spelling or, for some very ancient documents, the Perso-Arabic alphabet. Modest attempts were made over time to write Berber in Arabic, but in vain. This was mainly due to illiteracy and a lack of interest in writing among the Berber tribes, particularly the Zenata (يزناتن). However, due to the inability of a large portion of the population to understand and read Arabic, although a large proportion of them attended Quranic schools and learned Arabic signs, clerics and intellectuals began to write books in Berber (while the vast majority of books are in Arabic), with rare examples of additional letters and real codification. It was not until the end of the 19th century that an Arab-Berber alphabet was codified.

== Bibliography ==
- Souag, Lameen (2004). "Writing Berber Languages: a quick summary". L. Souag. Archived from the original on 2005-07-30.
