= Ṭhē =

Arabic-based letter

Ṭhē is an additional letter of the Arabic script. It has the basic shape of tāʼ (ت), but with vertical dots, rather than horizontal. It is not used in the Arabic alphabet itself, but is used to represent an aspirated [ʈʰ] in Sindhi, a language mainly spoken in Pakistan. Its Latin description is ṭh, or sometimes t́h.

In an older version of the script, the ٽ was used instead of ٺ and vice versa.

Position in word	Isolated	Final	Medial	Initial
Glyph form: (Help)	ٺ	ـٺ	ـٺـ	ٺـ

Sindhi is also written in Devanagari, where the corresponding letter is ठ.

The letter is encoded in the Arabic Unicode block as Tteheh at U+067A.

Unicode code point	Unicode-Name	Zeichen
U+067A	ARABIC LETTER TTEHEH	ٺ
U+FB5E	ARABIC LETTER TTEHEH ISOLATED FORM	ﭞ
U+FB5F	ARABIC LETTER TTEHEH FINAL FORM	ـٺ
U+FB60	ARABIC LETTER TTEHEH INITIAL FORM	ﭠ
U+FB61	ARABIC LETTER TTEHEH MEDIAL FORM	ـٺـ
