= ݭ =

Additional letter of the Arabic script

ݭ is an additional letter of the Arabic script, derived from sīn (س) with the addition of two vertically aligned dots above the letter. It is not used in the Arabic language, but is used in Kalami to represent a voiceless retroflex fricative, [ʂ], and in Ormuri to represent a voiceless alveolo-palatal fricative, [ɕ]. In Gawar-Bati, the letter is also used to represent voiceless retroflex fricative, [ʂ].
