= Bā with three dots horizontally below =

Letter in the Arabic alphabet

ݐ (Unicode name: Arabic Letter Beh With Three Dots Horizontally Below) is an additional letter of the Arabic script, used in some African languages such as Fulfulde. It is equivalent to the Latin letter Ƴ ƴ.
