= Pe (Persian letter) =

Letter used to represent the [p] sound in Persian and Kurdish alphabet

- پ

Usage
- Writing system: Arabic script
- Type: Abjad
- Language of origin: Persian language
- Sound values: p
- Alphabetical position: 3

History
- Development: 𐤁: 𐡁; 𐢂 ,𐢃; ٮ; ب; پ

Other
- Writing direction: Right-to-left

Pe (پ) is a letter in the Persian alphabet and the Kurdish alphabet used to represent the voiceless bilabial plosive [p]. It is based on Bā' (ب) with two additional diacritic dots. It is one of the five letters that were created specifically for the Persian alphabet to symbolize sounds found in Persian but not in Arabic, others being Že (ژ), Če (چ), and Gaf (گ), in addition the obsolete Ve (ڤ). In name and shape, it is a variant of Bā' (ب).

It is used in Persian, Kurdish, Pashto, Balochi, and other Iranian languages, Uyghur, Urdu, Sindhi, Kashmiri, Shina, and Turkic languages (before the Latin and Cyrillic scripts were adopted). Its numerical value is 2000 (see Abjad numerals).

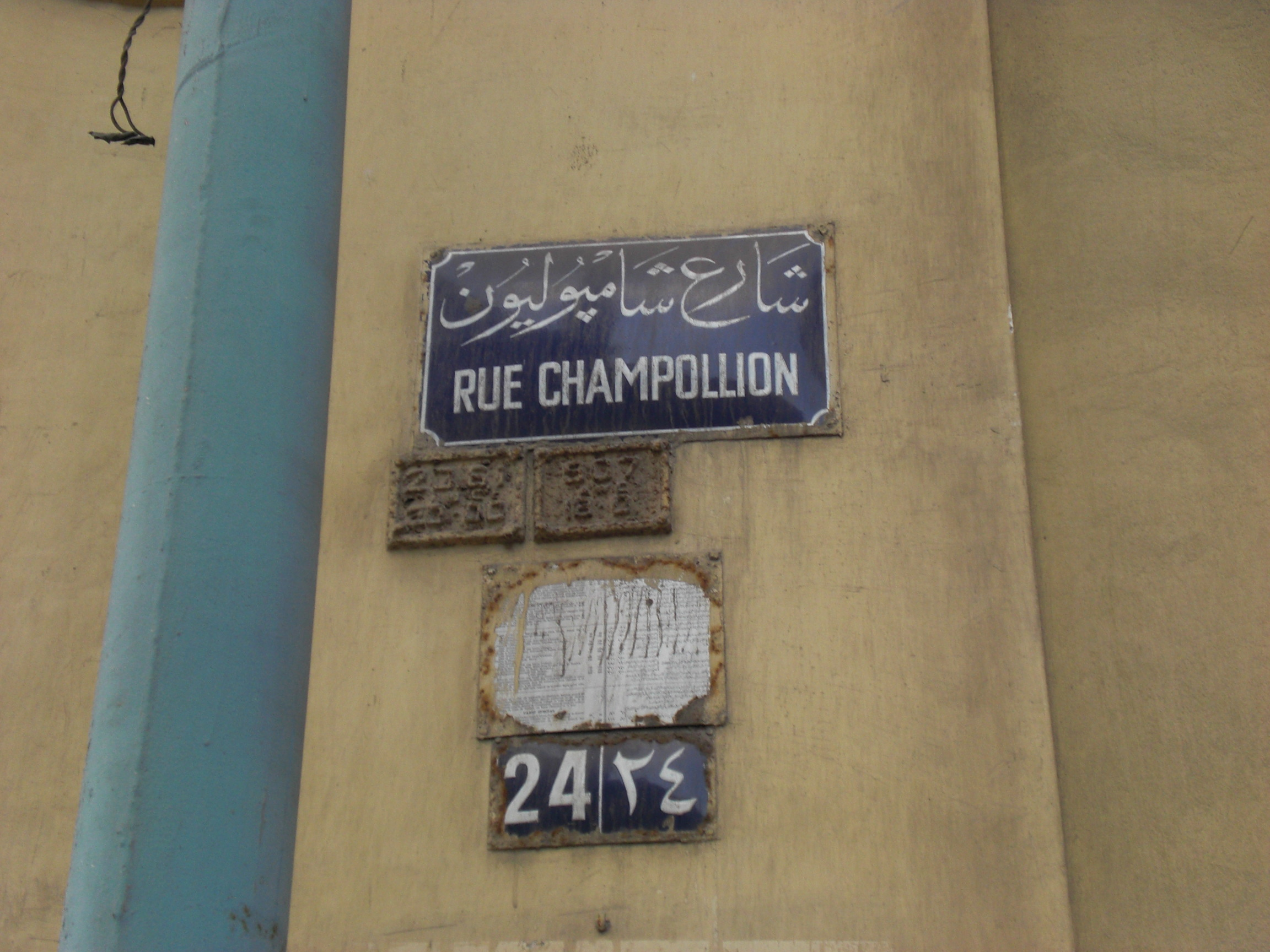
Example of the letter's use on a street sign in Alexandria, Egypt, in French Rue Champollion and Arabic شارع شامپوليون

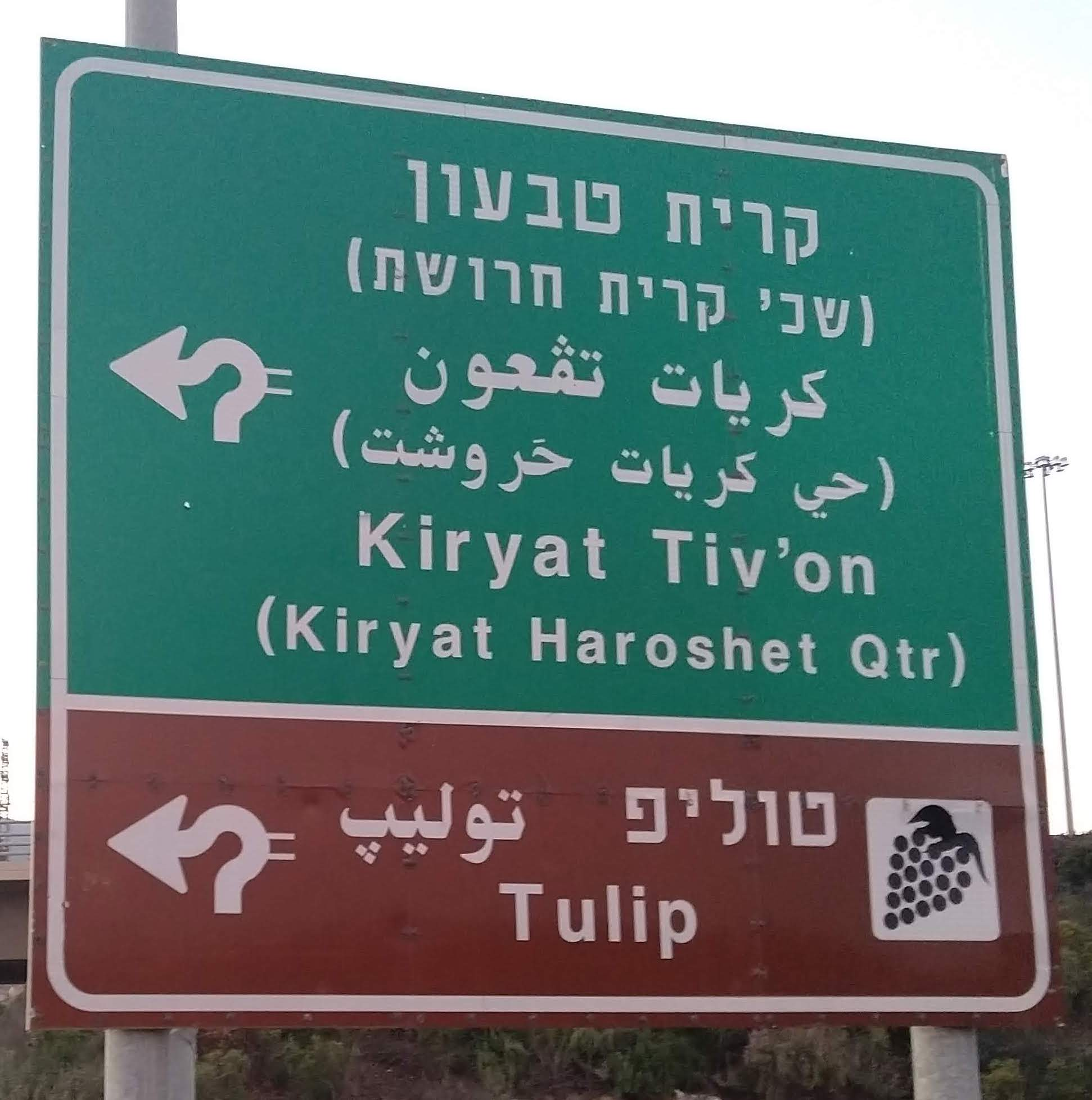
A trilingual road sign in Israel transliterates the final consonant from a winery with the English name "Tulip" into Arabic and Hebrew using non-native letters: Pe (پ) in Arabic and the non-final form of פ in Hebrew

It is one of additional common foreign letters that are sometimes used in some Arabic dialects to represent foreign sounds, it represents /p/ in loanwords and it can be substituted by Bā' (ب) /b/ such as in protein which is written as بروتين /broːtiːn/ or پروتين /proːtiːn/. In Egypt, the letter is called "Bā' with three dots" (به بتلات نقط, Bā' be-talat noʾaṭ, [be beˈtælæt ˈnoʔɑtˤ]).

In Israel, the letter is sometimes used to transliterate names containing /p/ into Arabic, when that sound originates in non-Semitic languages. When the /p/ sound comes from a Hebrew word, there is normally an Arabic translation instead. When representing this sound in transliteration of Persian into Hebrew, it is written as ב׳.

Position in word:	Isolated	Final	Medial	Initial
Glyph form: (Help)	پ	ـپ	ـپـ	پـ

== Character encodings ==
Character information
Preview	پ	
Unicode name	PERSIAN LETTER PEH	
Encodings	decimal	hex
Unicode	1662	U+067E
UTF-8	217 190	D9 BE
Numeric character reference	&#1662;	&#x67E;

== See also ==
- Če (ﭺ)
- Gaf (گ)
- Ve (ڤ)
- Že (ژ)
