= Že (Persian letter) =

Persian letter

- ژ

Usage
- Writing system: Arabic script
- Type: Abjad
- Language of origin: Persian language
- Sound values: ʒ and /t͡s/ (in Kashmiri)
- Alphabetical position: 14

History
- Development: 𐤆: 𐡆; 𐢉; ر; ز; ژ

Other
- Writing direction: Right-to-left

Že or Zhe (ژ), used to represent the phoneme /ʒ/, is a letter in the Persian alphabet, based on Zāy (ز) with two additional diacritic dots. It is one of the five letters that the Persian alphabet adds to the original Arabic script, others being Če (چ), Gaf (گ), and Pe (پ), in addition the obsolete Ve (ڤ). In name and shape, it is a variant of ze. Its numerical value is 4000 (see Abjad numerals).

It is found with this value in other Arabic-derived scripts. It is used in Pashto, Kurdish, Balochi, Pashto, Luri, Uyghur, Ottoman Turkish (j in the modern Turkish alphabet), Arabic-script Azerbaijani, and Urdu, but not in Modern Standard Arabic (MSA).

In Kashmiri, this letter is called Tse and represents the phoneme /t͡s/. Its aspirated form are the letters ژھ, which represents the phoneme /t͡sʰ/.

In most of the Levant and the Maghreb, the letter ج ǧīm is used for /ʒ/. In Moroccan Arabic, the letter Že (ژ) is sometimes used to represent emphatic Z, such as in the word bež (بژ) meaning "children", as opposed to the normal Zay (ز), in order to differentiate between words that would look similar (for example bez (بز) meaning "forcing" or "to force").

When representing this sound in transliteration of Persian into Hebrew, it is written as ז׳.

Position in word:	Isolated	Final	Medial	Initial
Glyph form: (Help)	ژ	ـژ	ـژ	ژ

== Character encodings ==
Character information
Preview	ژ	
Unicode name	PERSIAN LETTER JEH	
Encodings	decimal	hex
Unicode	1688	U+0698
UTF-8	218 152	DA 98
Numeric character reference	&#1688;	&#x698;

== See also ==
- Če (ﭺ)
- Gaf (گ)
- Pe (پ)
- Ve (ڤ)
- Ž
- Že (Cyrillic)
