= Rā with two dots vertically above =

Additional letter of the Arabic script

ݫ (Unicode name: Arabic Letter Reh With Two Dots Vertically Above) is an additional letter of the Arabic script, derived from rāʾ (ر) with the addition of two dots above the letter. It is not used in the Arabic alphabet itself, but is used in Ormuri to represent a voiced alveolo-palatal fricative, [ʑ]), as well as in Torwali.
