= El Guerrouj =

El Guerrouj is a Moroccan surname. Notable people with the surname include:

- Abdeladim El Guerrouj (born 1972), Moroccan politician
- Hicham El Guerrouj (born 1974), Moroccan middle-distance runner
