= ڼ =

Arabic letter

ڼ is the twenty-ninth letter of Pashto alphabet. It represents the retroflex nasal (IPA: /ɳ/) which is ण in Devanagari and is transliterated ⟨ṇ⟩. In Shahmukhi and Saraiki it is written as ݨ.

== Forms ==
Position in word	Isolated	Final	Medial	Initial
Glyph form: (Help)	ڼ	ـڼ	ـڼـ	ڼـ
