= Arabic (Unicode block) =

- Range: U+0600..U+06FF (256 code points)
- Plane: BMP
- Scripts: Arabic (238 char.); Common (6 char.); Inherited (12 char.)
- Major alphabets: Arabic; Kashmiri; Kurdish; Pashto; Persian; Punjabi; Sindhi; Urdu
- Assigned: 256 code points
- Unused: 0 reserved code points 1 deprecated
- Source standards: ISO 8859-6

Unicode version history
- 1.0.0 (1991): 169 (+169)
- 1.1 (1993): 194 (+25)
- 3.0 (1999): 206 (+12)
- 3.2 (2002): 208 (+2)
- 4.0 (2003): 227 (+19)
- 4.1 (2005): 235 (+8)
- 5.1 (2008): 250 (+15)
- 6.0 (2010): 252 (+2)
- 6.1 (2012): 253 (+1)
- 6.3 (2013): 254 (+1)
- 7.0 (2014): 255 (+1)
- 14.0 (2021): 256 (+1)

Unicode documentation
- Code chart ∣ Web page

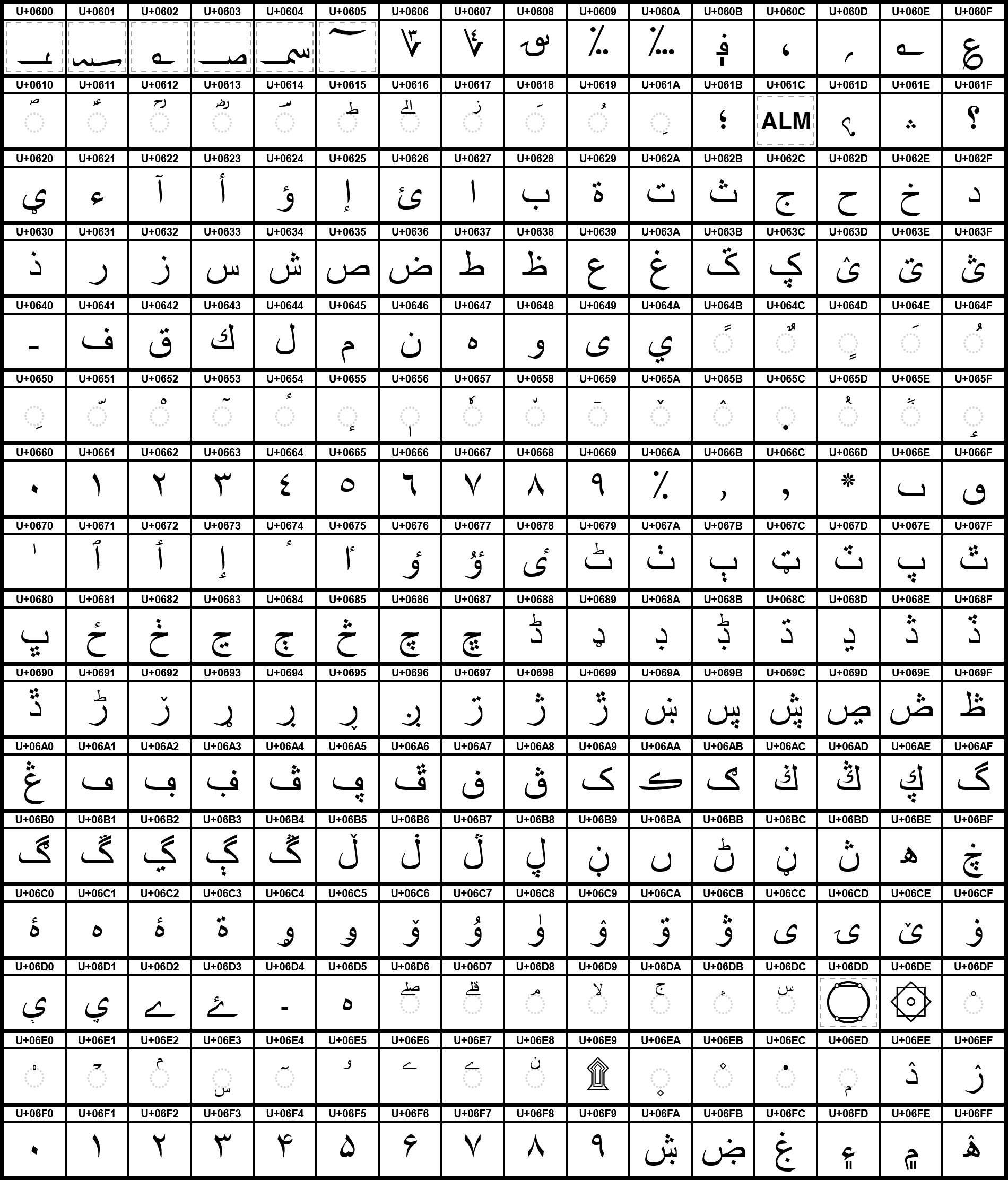
Graphical representation of the Arabic Unicode block

Arabic is a Unicode block, containing the standard letters and the most common diacritics of the Arabic script, and the Arabic-Indic digits.

== Unicode chart ==
Arabic^{[1]}^{[2]} Official Unicode Consortium code chart (PDF)
	0	1	2	3	4	5	6	7	8	9	A	B	C	D	E	F
U+060x	؀	؁	؂	؃	؄	؅	؆	؇	؈	؉	؊	؋	،	؍	؎	؏
U+061x	ؐ	ؑ	ؒ	ؓ	ؔ	ؕ	ؖ	ؗ	ؘ	ؙ	ؚ	؛	ALM	؝	؞	؟
U+062x	ؠ	ء	آ	أ	ؤ	إ	ئ	ا	ب	ة	ت	ث	ج	ح	خ	د
U+063x	ذ	ر	ز	س	ش	ص	ض	ط	ظ	ع	غ	ػ	ؼ	ؽ	ؾ	ؿ
U+064x	ـ	ف	ق	ك	ل	م	ن	ه	و	ى	ي	ً	ٌ	ٍ	َ	ُ
U+065x	ِ	ّ	ْ	ٓ	ٔ	ٕ	ٖ	ٗ	٘	ٙ	ٚ	ٛ	ٜ	ٝ	ٞ	ٟ
U+066x	٠	١	٢	٣	٤	٥	٦	٧	٨	٩	٪	٫	٬	٭	ٮ	ٯ
U+067x	ٰ	ٱ	ٲ	ٳ	ٴ	ٵ	ٶ	ٷ	ٸ	ٹ	ٺ	ٻ	ټ	ٽ	پ	ٿ
U+068x	ڀ	ځ	ڂ	ڃ	ڄ	څ	چ	ڇ	ڈ	ډ	ڊ	ڋ	ڌ	ڍ	ڎ	ڏ
U+069x	ڐ	ڑ	ڒ	ړ	ڔ	ڕ	ږ	ڗ	ژ	ڙ	ښ	ڛ	ڜ	ڝ	ڞ	ڟ
U+06Ax	ڠ	ڡ	ڢ	ڣ	ڤ	ڥ	ڦ	ڧ	ڨ	ک	ڪ	ګ	ڬ	ڭ	ڮ	گ
U+06Bx	ڰ	ڱ	ڲ	ڳ	ڴ	ڵ	ڶ	ڷ	ڸ	ڹ	ں	ڻ	ڼ	ڽ	ھ	ڿ
U+06Cx	ۀ	ہ	ۂ	ۃ	ۄ	ۅ	ۆ	ۇ	ۈ	ۉ	ۊ	ۋ	ی	ۍ	ێ	ۏ
U+06Dx	ې	ۑ	ے	ۓ	۔	ە	ۖ	ۗ	ۘ	ۙ	ۚ	ۛ	ۜ	۝	۞	۟
U+06Ex	۠	ۡ	ۢ	ۣ	ۤ	ۥ	ۦ	ۧ	ۨ	۩	۪	۫	۬	ۭ	ۮ	ۯ
U+06Fx	۰	۱	۲	۳	۴	۵	۶	۷	۸	۹	ۺ	ۻ	ۼ	۽	۾	ۿ
Notes: 1. As of Unicode version 17.0; 2. Unicode code point U+0673 is deprecated as of Unicode version 6.0

== History ==
The following Unicode-related documents record the purpose and process of defining specific characters in the Arabic block:

Version	Final code points (Note: Proposed code points and characters names may differ from final code points and names)	Count	L2 ID	WG2 ID	Document
1.0.0	U+060C, 061B, 061F, 0621..063A, 0640..0652, 0660..066C, 0670..06B7, 06BA..06BE, 06C0..06CE, 06D0..06D5, 06F0..06F9	169			(to be determined)
1.0.0	U+060C, 061B, 061F, 0621..063A, 0640..0652, 0660..066C, 0670..06B7, 06BA..06BE, 06C0..06CE, 06D0..06D5, 06F0..06F9	169	L2/00-115R2		Moore, Lisa (2000-08-08), "Arabic Thousands Separator", Minutes Of UTC Meeting #83
1.0.0	U+060C, 061B, 061F, 0621..063A, 0640..0652, 0660..066C, 0670..06B7, 06BA..06BE, 06C0..06CE, 06D0..06D5, 06F0..06F9	169	L2/01-184R		Moore, Lisa (2001-06-18), "Arabic Cursive Joining", Minutes from the UTC/L2 meeting
1.0.0	U+060C, 061B, 061F, 0621..063A, 0640..0652, 0660..066C, 0670..06B7, 06BA..06BE, 06C0..06CE, 06D0..06D5, 06F0..06F9	169	L2/01-270		Hosken, Martin (2001-06-19), How U+06D5 works in Uighur, Some technical information collected
1.0.0	U+060C, 061B, 061F, 0621..063A, 0640..0652, 0660..066C, 0670..06B7, 06BA..06BE, 06C0..06CE, 06D0..06D5, 06F0..06F9	169	L2/01-295R		Moore, Lisa (2001-11-06), "Properties - Joining Behavior of U+06D5", Minutes from the UTC/L2 meeting #88
1.0.0	U+060C, 061B, 061F, 0621..063A, 0640..0652, 0660..066C, 0670..06B7, 06BA..06BE, 06C0..06CE, 06D0..06D5, 06F0..06F9	169	L2/04-290		Karlsson, Kent (2004-07-16), Updating the Arabic Shaping normative data
1.0.0	U+060C, 061B, 061F, 0621..063A, 0640..0652, 0660..066C, 0670..06B7, 06BA..06BE, 06C0..06CE, 06D0..06D5, 06F0..06F9	169	L2/04-419		Davis, Mark (2004-11-18), ArabicShaping suggestion e-mail
1.0.0	U+060C, 061B, 061F, 0621..063A, 0640..0652, 0660..066C, 0670..06B7, 06BA..06BE, 06C0..06CE, 06D0..06D5, 06F0..06F9	169	L2/09-146		Pournader, Roozbeh (2009-04-15), Moving dots and Arabic script shaping: Farsi Yeh's and Jawi Nya
1.0.0	U+060C, 061B, 061F, 0621..063A, 0640..0652, 0660..066C, 0670..06B7, 06BA..06BE, 06C0..06CE, 06D0..06D5, 06F0..06F9	169	L2/09-104		Moore, Lisa (2009-05-20), "Motion 119-M2", UTC #119 / L2 #216 Minutes, "Deprecate U+0673 ARABIC LETTER ALEF WITH WAVY HAMZA BELOW."
1.0.0	U+060C, 061B, 061F, 0621..063A, 0640..0652, 0660..066C, 0670..06B7, 06BA..06BE, 06C0..06CE, 06D0..06D5, 06F0..06F9	169	L2/09-335R		Moore, Lisa (2009-11-10), "Deprecation of U+0673 ARABIC LETTER ALEF WITH WAVY HAMZA BELOW (B.10.1)", UTC #121 / L2 #218 Minutes
1.0.0	U+060C, 061B, 061F, 0621..063A, 0640..0652, 0660..066C, 0670..06B7, 06BA..06BE, 06C0..06CE, 06D0..06D5, 06F0..06F9	169	L2/10-045		Allawi, Adil (2010-01-27), Proposal for changes to ArabicShaping.txt to allow machine generation of Arabic fonts and glyphs
1.0.0	U+060C, 061B, 061F, 0621..063A, 0640..0652, 0660..066C, 0670..06B7, 06BA..06BE, 06C0..06CE, 06D0..06D5, 06F0..06F9	169	L2/10-168		Mansour, Kamal (2010-05-04), Problems with the joining behavior of Arabic Letter Yeh Barree (U+06D2)
1.0.0	U+060C, 061B, 061F, 0621..063A, 0640..0652, 0660..066C, 0670..06B7, 06BA..06BE, 06C0..06CE, 06D0..06D5, 06F0..06F9	169	L2/10-108		Moore, Lisa (2010-05-19), "Action item 123-A49", UTC #123 / L2 #220 Minutes, "Update section 8.2 to explain how to deal with the need for representing "medial" of Yeh Barree in text."
1.0.0	U+060C, 061B, 061F, 0621..063A, 0640..0652, 0660..066C, 0670..06B7, 06BA..06BE, 06C0..06CE, 06D0..06D5, 06F0..06F9	169	L2/11-092		Pournader, Roozbeh (2011-03-08), Changes to schematic names of Arabic letters
1.0.0	U+060C, 061B, 061F, 0621..063A, 0640..0652, 0660..066C, 0670..06B7, 06BA..06BE, 06C0..06CE, 06D0..06D5, 06F0..06F9	169	L2/11-206	N4066	Proposing to Supplement with the Script and Character of Chaghatay Language, 2011-04-25
1.0.0	U+060C, 061B, 061F, 0621..063A, 0640..0652, 0660..066C, 0670..06B7, 06BA..06BE, 06C0..06CE, 06D0..06D5, 06F0..06F9	169		N4067	Proposal to Encode Special Scripts and Characters in UCS for Uighur language, 2011-05-15
1.0.0	U+060C, 061B, 061F, 0621..063A, 0640..0652, 0660..066C, 0670..06B7, 06BA..06BE, 06C0..06CE, 06D0..06D5, 06F0..06F9	169	L2/11-245	N4113	Aalto, Tero (2011-06-08), Ad hoc report on Uighur
1.0.0	U+060C, 061B, 061F, 0621..063A, 0640..0652, 0660..066C, 0670..06B7, 06BA..06BE, 06C0..06CE, 06D0..06D5, 06F0..06F9	169		N4103	"11.11 Additional Characters for Uighur and Chaghatay Languages", Unconfirmed minutes of WG 2 meeting 58, 2012-01-03
1.0.0	U+060C, 061B, 061F, 0621..063A, 0640..0652, 0660..066C, 0670..06B7, 06BA..06BE, 06C0..06CE, 06D0..06D5, 06F0..06F9	169	L2/12-063	N4218	Proposal to add a Named UCS Sequence Identifier UYGHUR LETTERS, 2012-02-02
1.0.0	U+060C, 061B, 061F, 0621..063A, 0640..0652, 0660..066C, 0670..06B7, 06BA..06BE, 06C0..06CE, 06D0..06D5, 06F0..06F9	169	L2/12-101	N4231	Pournader, Roozbeh; Anderson, Deborah (2012-02-09), Comments on N4218 Proposal to add a Named UCS Sequence Identifier UYGHUR LETTERS
1.0.0	U+060C, 061B, 061F, 0621..063A, 0640..0652, 0660..066C, 0670..06B7, 06BA..06BE, 06C0..06CE, 06D0..06D5, 06F0..06F9	169		N4253 (pdf, doc)	"10.3.3 NUSI-s for Uyghur Letters", Unconfirmed minutes of WG 2 meeting 59, 2012-09-12
1.0.0	U+060C, 061B, 061F, 0621..063A, 0640..0652, 0660..066C, 0670..06B7, 06BA..06BE, 06C0..06CE, 06D0..06D5, 06F0..06F9	169	L2/12-381		Pournader, Roozbeh (2012-11-03), Initial and medial forms of Arabic Letter Noon Ghunna
1.0.0	U+060C, 061B, 061F, 0621..063A, 0640..0652, 0660..066C, 0670..06B7, 06BA..06BE, 06C0..06CE, 06D0..06D5, 06F0..06F9	169	L2/12-343R2		Moore, Lisa (2012-12-04), "Consensus 133-C29", UTC #133 Minutes, "Accept 9 named sequences..."
1.0.0	U+060C, 061B, 061F, 0621..063A, 0640..0652, 0660..066C, 0670..06B7, 06BA..06BE, 06C0..06CE, 06D0..06D5, 06F0..06F9	169	L2/13-119		Pournader, Roozbeh (2013-05-08), Dot positioning of U+06A3 Arabic Letter Feh with Dot Below
1.0.0	U+060C, 061B, 061F, 0621..063A, 0640..0652, 0660..066C, 0670..06B7, 06BA..06BE, 06C0..06CE, 06D0..06D5, 06F0..06F9	169	L2/13-058		Moore, Lisa (2013-06-12), "B.13.4", UTC #135 Minutes
1.0.0	U+060C, 061B, 061F, 0621..063A, 0640..0652, 0660..066C, 0670..06B7, 06BA..06BE, 06C0..06CE, 06D0..06D5, 06F0..06F9	169		N4463	Silamu, Wushour; Anderson, Deborah; Constable, Peter (2013-06-28), User Guidelines for Uyghur, Kazakh, Kyrgyz, and Chagatai
1.0.0	U+060C, 061B, 061F, 0621..063A, 0640..0652, 0660..066C, 0670..06B7, 06BA..06BE, 06C0..06CE, 06D0..06D5, 06F0..06F9	169	L2/13-226		Milo, Thomas (2013-11-26), Arabic Amphibious Characters
1.0.0	U+060C, 061B, 061F, 0621..063A, 0640..0652, 0660..066C, 0670..06B7, 06BA..06BE, 06C0..06CE, 06D0..06D5, 06F0..06F9	169		N4403 (pdf, doc)	Umamaheswaran, V. S. (2014-01-28), "10.4.6 Draft UTN on User Guidelines for Uyghur, Kazakh, Kyrgyz and Chagatai", Unconfirmed minutes of WG 2 meeting 61, Holiday Inn, Vilnius, Lithuania; 2013-06-10/14
1.0.0	U+060C, 061B, 061F, 0621..063A, 0640..0652, 0660..066C, 0670..06B7, 06BA..06BE, 06C0..06CE, 06D0..06D5, 06F0..06F9	169	L2/14-109		Milo, Thomas (2014-05-01), Koranic and Classic orthography in Unicode and computer typography
1.0.0	U+060C, 061B, 061F, 0621..063A, 0640..0652, 0660..066C, 0670..06B7, 06BA..06BE, 06C0..06CE, 06D0..06D5, 06F0..06F9	169	L2/14-136		Pournader, Roozbeh (2014-05-08), The right hehs for Arabic script orthographies of Sorani Kurdish and Uighur
1.0.0	U+060C, 061B, 061F, 0621..063A, 0640..0652, 0660..066C, 0670..06B7, 06BA..06BE, 06C0..06CE, 06D0..06D5, 06F0..06F9	169	L2/14-100		Moore, Lisa (2014-05-13), "C.3.5", UTC #139 Minutes
1.0.0	U+060C, 061B, 061F, 0621..063A, 0640..0652, 0660..066C, 0670..06B7, 06BA..06BE, 06C0..06CE, 06D0..06D5, 06F0..06F9	169	L2/20-289	N5155	Evans, Lorna Priest (2020-12-07), Request for glyph changes and annotations for Kazakh, Kyrgyz, and Uyghur [Affects U+0626, U+0674-0678, U+06C5, and U+06C7]
1.0.0	U+060C, 061B, 061F, 0621..063A, 0640..0652, 0660..066C, 0670..06B7, 06BA..06BE, 06C0..06CE, 06D0..06D5, 06F0..06F9	169	L2/21-016R		Anderson, Deborah; Whistler, Ken; Pournader, Roozbeh; Moore, Lisa; Liang, Hai (2021-01-14), "11a. Glyph changes and annotations for Kazakh, Kyrgyz, and Uyghur", Recommendations to UTC #166 January 2021 on Script Proposals
1.0.0	U+060C, 061B, 061F, 0621..063A, 0640..0652, 0660..066C, 0670..06B7, 06BA..06BE, 06C0..06CE, 06D0..06D5, 06F0..06F9	169	L2/21-009		Moore, Lisa (2021-01-27), "B.1 — 11a. Glyph changes and annotations for Kazakh, Kyrgyz, and Uyghur", UTC #166 Minutes
1.0.0	U+060C, 061B, 061F, 0621..063A, 0640..0652, 0660..066C, 0670..06B7, 06BA..06BE, 06C0..06CE, 06D0..06D5, 06F0..06F9	169	L2/21-050	N5160	Chinese comments on WG2 N5155, 2021-02-02
1.0.0	U+060C, 061B, 061F, 0621..063A, 0640..0652, 0660..066C, 0670..06B7, 06BA..06BE, 06C0..06CE, 06D0..06D5, 06F0..06F9	169	L2/21-098	N5162	Constable, Peter (2021-04-09), Response to China NB comments on WG2 N5155 (UTC document L2/21-050)
1.0.0	U+060C, 061B, 061F, 0621..063A, 0640..0652, 0660..066C, 0670..06B7, 06BA..06BE, 06C0..06CE, 06D0..06D5, 06F0..06F9	169	L2/21-073		Anderson, Deborah; Whistler, Ken; Pournader, Roozbeh; Moore, Lisa; Liang, Hai (2021-04-23), "4b. China comments on WG2 N5155", Recommendations to UTC #167 April 2021 on Script Proposals
1.1	U+066D, 06D6..06ED	25			(to be determined)
1.1	U+066D, 06D6..06ED	25	L2/01-428		Kew, Jonathan (2001-11-01), Request for clarification regarding U+06DD ARABIC END OF AYAH and other Arabic enclosing marks
1.1	U+066D, 06D6..06ED	25	L2/01-405R		Moore, Lisa (2001-12-12), "Arabic Enclosing Marks", Minutes from the UTC/L2 meeting in Mountain View, November 6-9, 2001
1.1	U+066D, 06D6..06ED	25	L2/03-112		Pournader, Roozbeh (2003-03-05), New Arabic controls and Arabic joining
1.1	U+066D, 06D6..06ED	25	L2/05-150		Freytag, Asmus (2005-05-05), Arabic errata
1.1	U+066D, 06D6..06ED	25	L2/05-151		Milo, Thomas (2005-05-12), Annotations to the printing of the 1924 Azhar Qur'an
1.1	U+066D, 06D6..06ED	25	L2/05-203		McGowan, Rick (2005-08-04), Public Review Issue #73: Representative Glyphs for Arabic Characters U+06DF, U+06E0, and U+06E1
1.1	U+066D, 06D6..06ED	25	L2/05-231		Mansour, Kamal (2005-08-11), Regarding the proposed changes for the representative glyphs for 06DF, 06E0, and 06E1
1.1	U+066D, 06D6..06ED	25		N2956	Freytag, Asmus (2005-08-12), "Representative Glyphs for Arabic Characters U+06DF, U+06E0, and U+06E1", Unicode Consortium Liaison Report for WG2 Meeting #47
1.1	U+066D, 06D6..06ED	25	L2/05-180		Moore, Lisa (2005-08-17), "Consensus 104-C8", UTC #104 Minutes, "Change the representative glyphs for three Arabic characters: U+06DF, U+06E0, U+06E1."
1.1	U+066D, 06D6..06ED	25	L2/05-108R		Moore, Lisa (2005-08-26), "Arabic Glyph Errata (B.21)", UTC #103 Minutes
1.1	U+066D, 06D6..06ED	25		N2953 (pdf, doc)	Umamaheswaran, V. S. (2006-02-16), "M47.16 (Miscellaneous glyph defects)", Unconfirmed minutes of WG 2 meeting 47, Sophia Antipolis, France; 2005-09-12/15
1.1	U+066D, 06D6..06ED	25	L2/06-324R2		Moore, Lisa (2006-11-29), "B.14.2", UTC #109 Minutes
1.1	U+066D, 06D6..06ED	25	L2/09-358R		Pournader, Roozbeh (2009-10-28), Discussion document for polishing Koranic support in Unicode
1.1	U+066D, 06D6..06ED	25	L2/10-209		Pournader, Roozbeh (2010-06-07), Public Review Issue #171: Changing the properties of U+06DE from a combining mark to a spacing symbol
1.1	U+066D, 06D6..06ED	25	L2/10-221		Moore, Lisa (2010-08-23), "Consensus 124-C13", UTC #124 / L2 #221 Minutes, "Change the general category of U+06DE to from "Me" to "So" and bidi class from "NSM" to "ON", and linebreak property from "CN" to "AL" and remove the dotted circle from the glyph, for Unicode 6.0."
3.0	U+0653..0655	3	L2/97-130		McGowan, R. (1997-02-24), The Unicode draft proposal for Syriac character encoding
3.0	U+0653..0655	3	L2/98-051		Nelson, Paul; Kiraz, George (1998-02-23), Supporting letters for Encoding Syriac
3.0	U+0653..0655	3	L2/98-052		Nelson, Paul; Kiraz, George (1998-02-23), Examples of Syriac
3.0	U+0653..0655	3	L2/98-070		Aliprand, Joan; Winkler, Arnold, "3.A.2. item a. Syriac script", Minutes of the joint UTC and L2 meeting from the meeting in Cupertino, February 25-27, 1998
3.0	U+0653..0655	3	L2/98-069		Nelson, Paul; Kiraz, George (1998-02-27), Presentation to support the coding of Syriac
3.0	U+0653..0655	3	L2/98-050	N1718	Nelson, Paul; Kiraz, George; Hasso, Sargon (1998-03-06), Proposal to Encode Syriac in ISO/IEC 10646
3.0	U+0653..0655	3	L2/98-156		Kiraz, George, Syriac: Unicode character properties
3.0	U+0653..0655	3	L2/98-158		Aliprand, Joan; Winkler, Arnold (1998-05-26), "Character Properties for Syriac Script", Draft Minutes – UTC #76 & NCITS Subgroup L2 #173 joint meeting, Tredyffrin, Pennsylvania, April 20-22, 1998
3.0	U+0653..0655	3	L2/98-286	N1703	Umamaheswaran, V. S.; Ksar, Mike (1998-07-02), "8.23", Unconfirmed Meeting Minutes, WG 2 Meeting #34, Redmond, WA, USA; 1998-03-16--20
3.0	U+0653..0655	3		N1837, N1837-Ireland	Summary of Voting/Table of Replies - Amendment 27 - Syriac, 1998-08-27
3.0	U+0653..0655	3	L2/98-322	N1907	ISO/IEC 10646-1/FPDAM. 27, AMENDMENT 27: Syriac, 1998-10-22
3.0	U+0653..0655	3		N1906	Paterson, Bruce; Everson, Michael (1998-10-22), Disposition of Comments - FPDAM27 - Syriac
3.0	U+0653..0655	3	L2/99-010	N1903 (pdf, html, doc)	Umamaheswaran, V. S. (1998-12-30), "6.7.10", Minutes of WG 2 meeting 35, London, U.K.; 1998-09-21--25
3.0	U+06B8..06B9, 06BF, 06CF, 06FA..06FE	9		N1573	Additional Arabic characters (chiefly from ISO 11822), 1997-06-19
3.0	U+06B8..06B9, 06BF, 06CF, 06FA..06FE	9	L2/97-288	N1603	Umamaheswaran, V. S. (1997-10-24), "8.24.6", Unconfirmed Meeting Minutes, WG 2 Meeting # 33, Heraklion, Crete, Greece, 20 June – 4 July 1997
3.0	U+06B8..06B9, 06BF, 06CF, 06FA..06FE	9	L2/98-004R	N1681	Text of ISO 10646 – AMD 18 for PDAM registration and FPDAM ballot, 1997-12-22
3.0	U+06B8..06B9, 06BF, 06CF, 06FA..06FE	9	L2/98-318	N1894	Revised text of 10646-1/FPDAM 18, AMENDMENT 18: Symbols and Others, 1998-10-22
3.0	U+06B8..06B9, 06BF, 06CF, 06FA..06FE	9	L2/20-288		Evans, Lorna Priest (2020-12-07), "U+06FE ARABIC SIGN SINDHI POSTPOSITION MEN", Request for annotations for Sindhi and Behdini Kurdish
3.0	U+06B8..06B9, 06BF, 06CF, 06FA..06FE	9	L2/21-016R		Anderson, Deborah; Whistler, Ken; Pournader, Roozbeh; Moore, Lisa; Liang, Hai (2021-01-14), "11b. Sindhi and Behdini Kurdish", Recommendations to UTC #166 January 2021 on Script Proposals
3.0	U+06B8..06B9, 06BF, 06CF, 06FA..06FE	9	L2/21-009		Moore, Lisa (2021-01-27), "B.1 — 11b. Sindhi and Behdini Kurdish", UTC #166 Minutes
3.2	U+066E..066F	2	L2/00-354		Davis, Mark; Mansour, Kamal (2000-10-12), Proposal For Addition To Arabic repertoire
3.2	U+066E..066F	2	L2/00-324		Moore, Lisa (2001-01-29), "Motion 85-M6", Minutes from UTC #85, San Diego
3.2	U+066E..066F	2	L2/01-150	N2357	Proposal to encode two Arabic characters to the UCS, 2001-04-04
3.2	U+066E..066F	2	L2/01-344	N2353 (pdf, doc)	Umamaheswaran, V. S. (2001-09-09), "7.15", Minutes from SC2/WG2 meeting #40 -- Mountain View, April 2001
4.0	U+0600..0602, 060D..060E, 0610..0614, 0656..0658	13	L2/00-135		Nelson, Paul; Farhan, Ashhar; Hisam, Arif; Hisam, Kashif; Clews, John (2000-04-07), Proposal to Add Urdu Epethit and Abbreviation Diacritics to the Arabic Block
4.0	U+0600..0602, 060D..060E, 0610..0614, 0656..0658	13	L2/01-303		Vikas, Om (2001-07-26), Letter from the Government from India on "Draft for Unicode Standard for Indian Scripts"
4.0	U+0600..0602, 060D..060E, 0610..0614, 0656..0658	13	L2/01-304		Feedback on Unicode Standard 3.0, 2001-08-02
4.0	U+0600..0602, 060D..060E, 0610..0614, 0656..0658	13	L2/01-305		McGowan, Rick (2001-08-08), Draft UTC Response to L2/01-304, "Feedback on Unicode Standard 3.0"
4.0	U+0600..0602, 060D..060E, 0610..0614, 0656..0658	13	L2/01-425	N2483	Kew, Jonathan (2001-11-01), Proposal to add Arabic-script honorifics and other marks
4.0	U+0600..0602, 060D..060E, 0610..0614, 0656..0658	13	L2/01-426		Kew, Jonathan (2001-11-01), Proposal to add Arabic-script honorifics and other marks, Appendix: Examples of usage
4.0	U+0600..0602, 060D..060E, 0610..0614, 0656..0658	13	L2/01-428		Kew, Jonathan (2001-11-01), Request for clarification regarding U+06DD ARABIC END OF AYAH and other Arabic enclosing marks
4.0	U+0600..0602, 060D..060E, 0610..0614, 0656..0658	13	L2/01-439		Milo, Tom (2001-11-02), Arabic Year-sign examples
4.0	U+0600..0602, 060D..060E, 0610..0614, 0656..0658	13	L2/01-430R		McGowan, Rick (2001-11-20), UTC Response to L2/01-304, "Feedback on Unicode Standard 3.0"
4.0	U+0600..0602, 060D..060E, 0610..0614, 0656..0658	13	L2/02-061	N2482	Kew, Jonathan (2002-01-29), Bidi committee consensus on Arabic additions from L2/01-425
4.0	U+0600..0602, 060D..060E, 0610..0614, 0656..0658	13	L2/02-227	N2487	Proposal to add 16 Arabic characters, 2002-05-21
4.0	U+0600..0602, 060D..060E, 0610..0614, 0656..0658	13	L2/02-070		Moore, Lisa (2002-08-26), "Scripts and New Characters - Arabic", Minutes for UTC #90
4.0	U+0600..0602, 060D..060E, 0610..0614, 0656..0658	13	L2/03-102		Vikas, Om (2003-03-04), Unicode Standard for Indic Scripts
4.0	U+0600..0602, 060D..060E, 0610..0614, 0656..0658	13	L2/03-101.10		Proposed Changes in Indic Scripts [Urdu, Sindhi, and Kashmiri document], 2003-03-04
4.0	U+0600..0602, 060D..060E, 0610..0614, 0656..0658	13	L2/03-112		Pournader, Roozbeh (2003-03-05), New Arabic controls and Arabic joining
4.0	U+0600..0602, 060D..060E, 0610..0614, 0656..0658	13	L2/04-196	N2653 (pdf, doc)	Umamaheswaran, V. S. (2004-06-04), "a-3", Unconfirmed minutes of WG 2 meeting 44
4.0	U+0600..0602, 060D..060E, 0610..0614, 0656..0658	13	L2/06-332		Esfahbod, Behdad; Pournader, Roozbeh (2006-10-15), Proposal to change the Bidi category of five Arabic characters from AL to AN
4.0	U+0600..0602, 060D..060E, 0610..0614, 0656..0658	13	L2/06-372		Lata, Swaran (2006-11-04), Issues Pertinent to Kashmiri
4.0	U+0600..0602, 060D..060E, 0610..0614, 0656..0658	13	L2/06-324R2		Moore, Lisa (2006-11-29), "Action item 109-A6, Consensus 109-C15", UTC #109 Minutes
4.0	U+0600..0602, 060D..060E, 0610..0614, 0656..0658	13	L2/15-183R		Pournader, Roozbeh (2015-07-28), Candidate characters for Grapheme_Cluster_Break=Prepend
4.0	U+0600..0602, 060D..060E, 0610..0614, 0656..0658	13	L2/15-187		Moore, Lisa (2015-08-11), "Consensus 144-C6", UTC #144 Minutes, "Change the Grapheme_Cluster_Break property of the 12 characters listed in L2/15-183R to "Prepend" for Unicode 9.0."
4.0	U+0603, 060F, 0615	3	L2/02-005		Hussain, Sarmad; Afzal, Muhammad (2001-12-18), Urdu Computing Standards (Charts and Exhibits)
4.0	U+0603, 060F, 0615	3	L2/02-006 (pdf, doc)	N2413-1	Zia, Khaver (2002-01-10), Towards Unicode Standard for Urdu
4.0	U+0603, 060F, 0615	3	L2/02-003	N2413-2	Afzal, Muhammad; Hussain, Sarmad (2001-12-28), Urdu Computing Standards: Development of Urdu Zabta Takhti (UZT) 1.01
4.0	U+0603, 060F, 0615	3	L2/02-004	N2413-3	Hussain, Sarmad; Afzal, Muhammad (2001-12-28), Urdu Computing Standards: Urdu Zabta Takhti (UZT) 1.01
4.0	U+0603, 060F, 0615	3	L2/02-163	N2413-4 (pdf, doc)	Proposal to add Marks and Digits in Arabic Code Block (for Urdu), 2002-04-30
4.0	U+0603, 060F, 0615	3	L2/02-011R		Kew, Jonathan (2002-01-12), Comments on L2/02-006: Towards Unicode Standard for Urdu
4.0	U+0603, 060F, 0615	3	L2/02-197		Freytag, Asmus (2002-05-01), Urdu Feedback from Bidi Committee
4.0	U+0603, 060F, 0615	3	L2/02-166R2		Moore, Lisa (2002-08-09), "Motion 91-M3", UTC #91 Minutes
4.0	U+0603, 060F, 0615	3	L2/02-372	N2453 (pdf, doc)	Umamaheswaran, V. S. (2002-10-30), "7.9 Urdu contribution", Unconfirmed minutes of WG 2 meeting 42
4.0	U+0603, 060F, 0615	3	L2/03-034		Nelson, Paul; Ross, Fiona; Holloway, Tim; Hudson, John (2003-02-10), Proposal to change character properties of ARABIC SIGN SAFHA (U+0603)
4.0	U+0603, 060F, 0615	3	L2/04-196	N2653 (pdf, doc)	Umamaheswaran, V. S. (2004-06-04), "a-3", Unconfirmed minutes of WG 2 meeting 44
4.0	U+06EE..06EF, 06FF	3	L2/01-427	N2481	Kew, Jonathan (2001-11-01), Proposal to add Parkari letters to Arabic block
4.0	U+06EE..06EF, 06FF	3	L2/01-405R		Moore, Lisa (2001-12-12), "Motion 89-M3", Minutes from the UTC/L2 meeting in Mountain View, November 6-9, 2001
4.0	U+06EE..06EF, 06FF	3	L2/02-227	N2487	Proposal to add 16 Arabic characters, 2002-05-21
4.1	U+060B	1		N2523	Everson, Michael (2002-11-20), Proposal to encode the AFGHANI SIGN in the UCS
4.1	U+060B	1	L2/03-330	N2640	Everson, Michael (2003-10-01), Revised proposal to encode the AFGHANI SIGN in the UCS
4.1	U+061E, 065A..065C	4	L2/98-274		Davis, Mark; Mansour, Kamal (1998-07-28), Proposed Arabic Script Additions for Minority Languages
4.1	U+061E, 065A..065C	4	L2/98-409		Davis, Mark; Mansour, Kamal (1998-12-01), Proposal to add 25 Arabic characters to the BMP
4.1	U+061E, 065A..065C	4	L2/98-419 (pdf, doc)		Aliprand, Joan (1999-02-05), "Additional Arabic characters", Approved Minutes -- UTC #78 & NCITS Subgroup L2 # 175 Joint Meeting, San Jose, CA -- December 1-4, 1998
4.1	U+061E, 065A..065C	4	L2/02-021		Davis, Mark; Mansour, Kamal (2002-01-17), Proposal To Amend Arabic repertoire
4.1	U+061E, 065A..065C	4	L2/03-154		Kew, Jonathan; Mansour, Kamal; Davis, Mark (2003-05-16), Proposal to encode productive Arabic-script modifier marks
4.1	U+061E, 065A..065C	4	L2/03-168		Kew, Jonathan (2003-06-02), Proposal to encode Arabic-script letters for African languages
4.1	U+061E, 065A..065C	4	L2/03-210		Kew, Jonathan (2003-06-12), Draft chart showing UTC #95 additions to Arabic blocks
4.1	U+061E, 065A..065C	4	L2/03-223	N2598	Kew, Jonathan (2003-07-10), Proposal to encode additional Arabic-script characters
4.1	U+0659	1	L2/03-133R	N2581R2	Everson, Michael; Pournader, Roozbeh (2003-05-29), Proposal to encode the ARABIC ZWARAKAY in the UCS
4.1	U+065D..065E	2	L2/04-025R	N2723	Kew, Jonathan (2004-03-15), Proposal to encode Additional Arabic script characters
5.1	U+0606..060A	5	L2/05-318		Lazrek, Azzeddine (2005-10-24), Proposals for Unicode Consortium [Arabic mathematical symbols]
5.1	U+0606..060A	5	L2/05-320		Lazrek, Azzeddine (2005-07-10), Arabic Mathematical Diverse Symbols, Additional characters proposed to Unicode
5.1	U+0606..060A	5	L2/06-125	N3086-1, N3086	Lazrek, Azzeddine (2006-03-30), Diverse Arabic Mathematical Symbols
5.1	U+0606..060A	5	L2/06-108		Moore, Lisa (2006-05-25), "C.16", UTC #107 Minutes
5.1	U+0606..060A	5		N3103 (pdf, doc)	Umamaheswaran, V. S. (2006-08-25), "8.14", Unconfirmed minutes of WG 2 meeting 48, Mountain View, CA, USA; 2006-04-24/27
5.1	U+0606..060A	5		N3153 (pdf, doc)	Umamaheswaran, V. S. (2007-02-16), "M49.7", Unconfirmed minutes of WG 2 meeting 49 AIST, Akihabara, Tokyo, Japan; 2006-09-25/29
5.1	U+0616, 063B..063F	6	L2/06-345R	N3180R	Everson, Michael; Pournader, Roozbeh; Sarbar, Elnaz (2006-10-24), Proposal to encode eight Arabic characters for Persian and Azerbaijani in the UCS
5.1	U+0616, 063B..063F	6	L2/06-324R2		Moore, Lisa (2006-11-29), "C.12", UTC #109 Minutes
5.1	U+0616, 063B..063F	6	L2/07-221		Hallissy, Bob (2007-07-19), Shaping behavior of Arabic characters based on Farsi Yeh [2007.07.19]
5.1	U+0616, 063B..063F	6	L2/07-268	N3253 (pdf, doc)	Umamaheswaran, V. S. (2007-07-26), "M50.15", Unconfirmed minutes of WG 2 meeting 50, Frankfurt-am-Main, Germany; 2007-04-24/27
5.1	U+0616, 063B..063F	6	L2/22-104		Pournader, Roozbeh (2022-05-19), Fixing the name and glyph for U+0616
5.1	U+0616, 063B..063F	6	L2/22-128		Anderson, Deborah; Whistler, Ken; Pournader, Roozbeh; Constable, Peter (2022-07-20), "4a ARABIC SMALL HIGH LIGATURE ALEF WITH LAM WITH YEH", Recommendations to UTC #172 July 2022 on Script Proposals
5.1	U+0616, 063B..063F	6	L2/22-121		Constable, Peter (2022-08-01), "Consensus 172-C2", Draft Minutes of UTC Meeting 172, "Create a formal name alias type correction for U+0616 ARABIC SMALL HIGH LIGATURE ALEF WITH LAM WITH YEH, with the value ARABIC SMALL HIGH LIGATURE ALEF WITH YEH BARREE."
5.1	U+0617..061A	4	L2/06-358R	N3185R	Everson, Michael; Pournader, Roozbeh (2006-11-01), Proposal to encode four Qur'anic Arabic characters in the UCS
5.1	U+0617..061A	4	L2/06-324R2		Moore, Lisa (2006-11-29), "Consensus 109-C29", UTC #109 Minutes
5.1	U+0617..061A	4	L2/07-268	N3253 (pdf, doc)	Umamaheswaran, V. S. (2007-07-26), "M50.14", Unconfirmed minutes of WG 2 meeting 50, Frankfurt-am-Main, Germany; 2007-04-24/27
6.0	U+0620, 065F	2	L2/98-274		Davis, Mark; Mansour, Kamal (1998-07-28), Proposed Arabic Script Additions for Minority Languages
6.0	U+0620, 065F	2	L2/98-409		Davis, Mark; Mansour, Kamal (1998-12-01), Proposal to add 25 Arabic characters to the BMP
6.0	U+0620, 065F	2	L2/98-419 (pdf, doc)		Aliprand, Joan (1999-02-05), "Additional Arabic characters", Approved Minutes -- UTC #78 & NCITS Subgroup L2 # 175 Joint Meeting, San Jose, CA -- December 1-4, 1998
6.0	U+0620, 065F	2	L2/02-021		Davis, Mark; Mansour, Kamal (2002-01-17), Proposal To Amend Arabic repertoire
6.0	U+0620, 065F	2	L2/09-406	N3686-I	Proposal to add one character in the Arabic block for representation of Kashmiri and annotation of existing characters, 2008-10-24
6.0	U+0620, 065F	2	L2/09-176		Aazim, Muzaffar; Mansour, Kamal; Pournader, Roozbeh (2009-04-30), Proposal to add two Kashmiri characters and one annotation to the Arabic block
6.0	U+0620, 065F	2	L2/09-215	N3673	Pournader, Roozbeh; Anderson, Deborah (2009-05-14), Proposal to add two Kashmiri characters
6.0	U+0620, 065F	2	L2/09-104		Moore, Lisa (2009-05-20), "B.15.11.4", UTC #119 / L2 #216 Minutes
6.0	U+0620, 065F	2		N3703 (pdf, doc)	Umamaheswaran, V. S. (2010-04-13), "M55.8", Unconfirmed minutes of WG 2 meeting no. 55, Tokyo 2009-10-26/30
6.0	U+0620, 065F	2	L2/10-169		Lata, Swaran (2010-05-06), Comments on the Proposed Arabic Letter Kashmiri Yeh
6.0	U+0620, 065F	2	L2/23-241		Goregaokar, Manish (2023-10-16), Annotations for Kashmiri Yeh
6.0	U+0620, 065F	2	L2/23-238R		Anderson, Deborah; Kučera, Jan; Whistler, Ken; Pournader, Roozbeh; Constable, Peter (2023-11-01), "3b Kashmiri Yeh", Recommendations to UTC #177 November 2023 on Script Proposals
6.0	U+0620, 065F	2	L2/23-273R		Goregaokar, Manish (2024-01-01), Report on Kashmiri Yeh
6.0	U+0620, 065F	2	L2/24-013R		Anderson, Deborah; Goregaokar, Manish; Kučera, Jan; Whistler, Ken; Pournader, Roozbeh; Constable, Peter (2024-01-22), "3b Potential disunification of KASHMIRI YEH", Recommendations to UTC #178 January 2024 on Script Proposals
6.0	U+0620, 065F	2	L2/24-152		Goregaokar, Manish; Pournader, Roozbeh (2024-06-23), Fixing the Kashmiri Yeh
6.0	U+0620, 065F	2	L2/24-166		Anderson, Deborah; Goregaokar, Manish; Kučera, Jan; Whistler, Ken; Pournader, Roozbeh; Constable, Peter (2024-07-18), "3b Fixing KASHMIRI YEH", Recommendations to UTC #180 July 2024 on Script Proposals
6.0	U+0620, 065F	2	L2/24-159		Constable, Peter (2024-07-29), "Consensus 180-C23", UTC #180 Minutes, "Change the representative glyph for U+0620 ARABIC LETTER KASHMIRI YEH"
6.1	U+0604	1	L2/09-335R		Moore, Lisa (2009-11-10), "C.11", UTC #121 / L2 #218 Minutes
6.1	U+0604	1	L2/09-144R3	N3734	Pandey, Anshuman (2009-11-20), Proposal to Encode the Samvat Date Sign for Arabic
6.1	U+0604	1		N3803 (pdf, doc)	"M56.08a", Unconfirmed minutes of WG 2 meeting no. 56, 2010-09-24
6.3	U+061C	1	L2/03-159		Kew, Jonathan (2003-05-28), Proposal to encode Arabic triple dot punctuation mark
6.3	U+061C	1	L2/11-005		Allouche, Matitiahu; Mohie, Mohamed (2011-01-16), Proposal to encode an Arabic-Letter Mark (ALM)
6.3	U+061C	1	L2/11-016		Moore, Lisa (2011-02-15), "Scripts and Symbols — Arabic letter mark", UTC #126 / L2 #223 Minutes
6.3	U+061C	1	L2/11-278		Allouche, Matitiahu; Mohie, Mohamed (2011-07-17), Proposal to encode an Arabic-Letter Mark (ALM)
6.3	U+061C	1	L2/11-397		Edberg, Peter (2011-10-25), Proposed addition of AL MARK and LEVEL DIRECTION MARK (PRI #205 background)
6.3	U+061C	1	L2/11-398		Edberg, Peter (2011-10-25), Accumulated Feedback on PRI #205 (moderated)
6.3	U+061C	1	L2/11-330	N4181	Anderson, Deborah (2011-11-04), Proposed Additions to ISO/IEC 10646
6.3	U+061C	1	L2/11-353		Moore, Lisa (2011-11-30), "B.11.18", UTC #129 / L2 #226 Minutes
6.3	U+061C	1	L2/11-432R	N4180 (pdf, doc)	Allouche, Matitiahu; Mohie, Mohamed (2012-02-15), Proposal to encode the Arabic Letter Mark (ALM)
6.3	U+061C	1		N4253 (pdf, doc)	"M59.16c", Unconfirmed minutes of WG 2 meeting 59, 2012-09-12
6.3	U+061C	1	L2/13-040		Pournader, Roozbeh; Lanin, Aharon (2013-01-29), Fasttracking Arabic Letter Mark (ALM)
6.3	U+061C	1	L2/13-011		Moore, Lisa (2013-02-04), "Consensus 134-C14", UTC #134 Minutes
6.3	U+061C	1	L2/13-240		Davis, Mark (2013-12-12), Reconciling Script and Script_Extensions
6.3	U+061C	1	L2/16-306		Constable, Peter (2016-10-28), Script property of Arabic Letter Mark and interaction with digit substitution mechanisms
6.3	U+061C	1	L2/17-016		Moore, Lisa (2017-02-08), "Consensus 150-C24", UTC #150 Minutes, "Change the Script property of U+061C from Common to Arabic, and change Script_Extensions from Default to Arabic, Syriac, and Thaana, for Unicode 10.0."
7.0	U+0605	1	L2/09-163R		Pandey, Anshuman (2009-09-15), Proposal to Encode Coptic Numerals in ISO/IEC 10646
7.0	U+0605	1	L2/10-114	N3786	Pandey, Anshuman (2010-04-10), Towards an Encoding for Coptic Numbers in the UCS
7.0	U+0605	1	L2/10-206R	N3843R	Pandey, Anshuman (2010-06-21), Final Proposal to Encode Coptic Numbers
7.0	U+0605	1	L2/10-421R	N3958R	Pandey, Anshuman (2010-11-01), Request to Rename 'Coptic Numbers' to 'Coptic Epact Numerals'
7.0	U+0605	1	L2/11-062R	N3990	Pandey, Anshuman (2011-02-14), Final Proposal to Encode Coptic Epact Numbers
7.0	U+0605	1		N3903 (pdf, doc)	"M57.16", Unconfirmed minutes of WG2 meeting 57, 2011-03-31
7.0	U+0605	1		N4103	"T.6. Arabic", Unconfirmed minutes of WG 2 meeting 58, 2012-01-03
14.0	U+061D	1	L2/20-245		Hosny, Khaled; Pournader, Roozbeh (2020-09-09), Proposal to encode three Arabic symbols
14.0	U+061D	1	L2/20-250		Anderson, Deborah; Whistler, Ken; Pournader, Roozbeh; Moore, Lisa; Constable, Peter; Liang, Hai (2020-10-01), "5a. Three Symbols", Recommendations to UTC #165 October 2020 on Script Proposals
14.0	U+061D	1	L2/20-237		Moore, Lisa (2020-10-27), "Consensus 165-C15", UTC #165 Minutes
