= Ve (Arabic letter) =

Perso-Arabic letter used to represent the /v/ sound

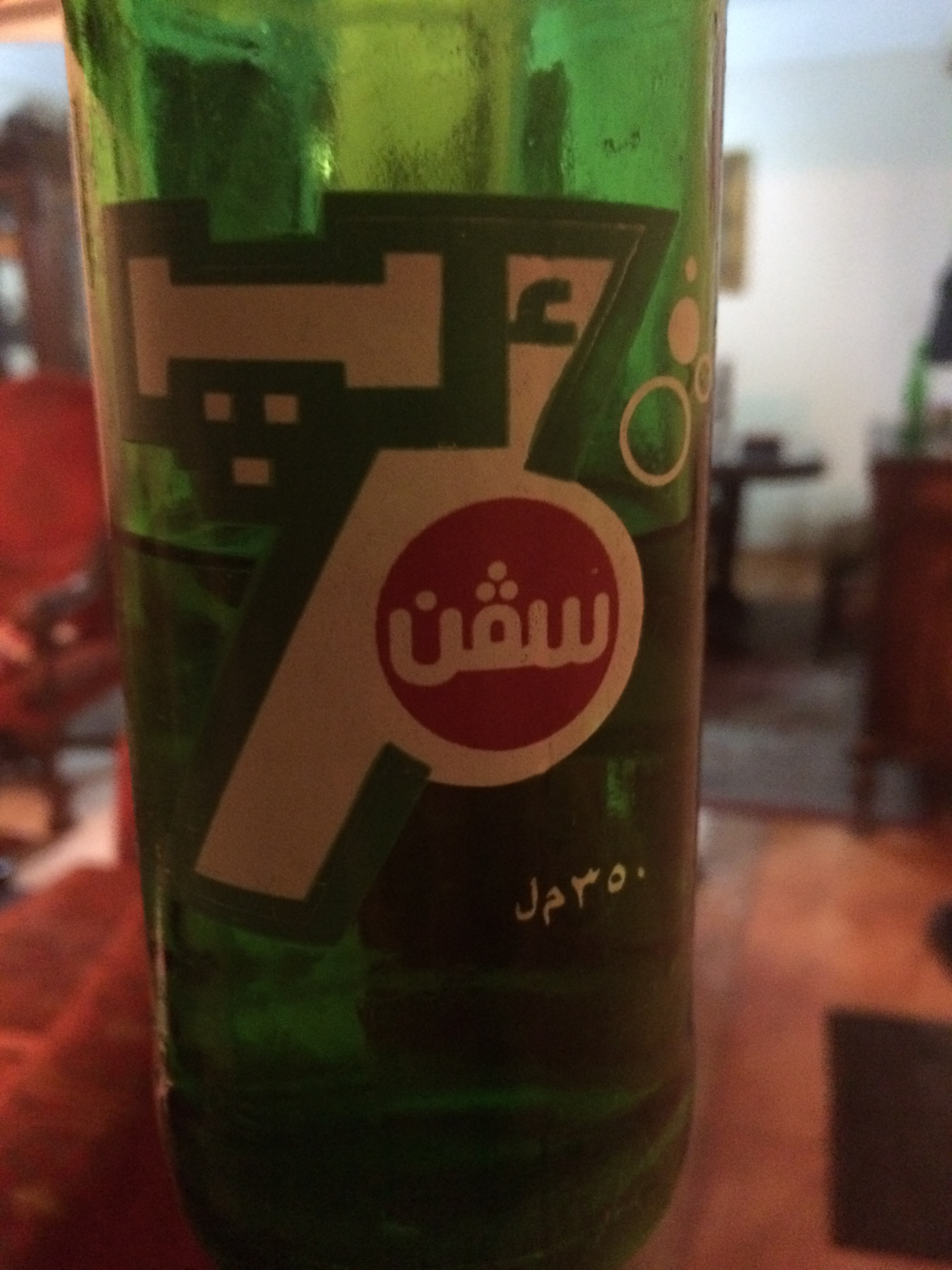
Egyptian 7 Up feautring the letter Ve (ڤ) in the Arabized version of seven (سڤن), note also that the letters Alif mahmūza (أ) and Pe (پ) are used to resemble the number 7

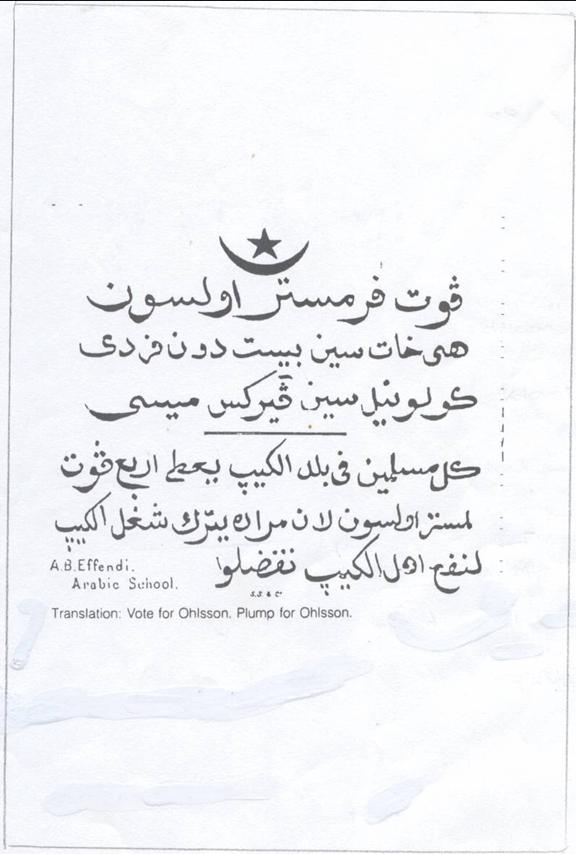
South African text by Abu Bakr Effendi in Arabic Afrikaans (upper) and Arabic (lower) showing the Ve (ڤ) in the word "vote" (ڤوت) used in Arabic even though the Modern Standard Arabic (MSA) word for vote is /sˤawt (صوت)

Ve (ڤ) is a letter of the Arabic-based Comoro, Kurdish, Luri, Swahili, Wakhi and Malay alphabets. It is derived from the Arabic letter Fāʾ (ف) with two additional dots. It represents the sound /v/ in the aforementioned uses. On the other hand, the letter Pa (ڤ) represents the sound /p/ in the Jawi (used for Malay) and Pegon (used for Javanese) alphabets.

Ve originated as one of the new letters added for the Perso-Arabic alphabet to write New Persian, and it was used for the sound /β/. This letter is no longer used in Persian, as the [β]-sound changed to [b], e.g. archaic زڤان /zaβɑn/ > زبان /zæbɒn/ 'language'

The letter Ve is sometimes used in various Arabic dialects to write names and loanwords with the phoneme /v/, such as Volvo (ڤولڤو),Vietnam (ڤيتنام), November (نوڤمبر) and Vienna (ڤيينا), but rather described, for example, in Egyptian Arabic, it is called Fāʾ with three dots (Arabic: فه بتلات نقط, lit. 'Fā' be talat noʾaṭ').

The character ڤ is mapped in Unicode under position U+06A4.

| Position in word: | Isolated | Final | Medial | Initial |
|---|---|---|---|---|
| Glyph form: (Help) | ڤ | ـڤ | ـڤـ | ڤـ |

== Ve (ڥ) ==
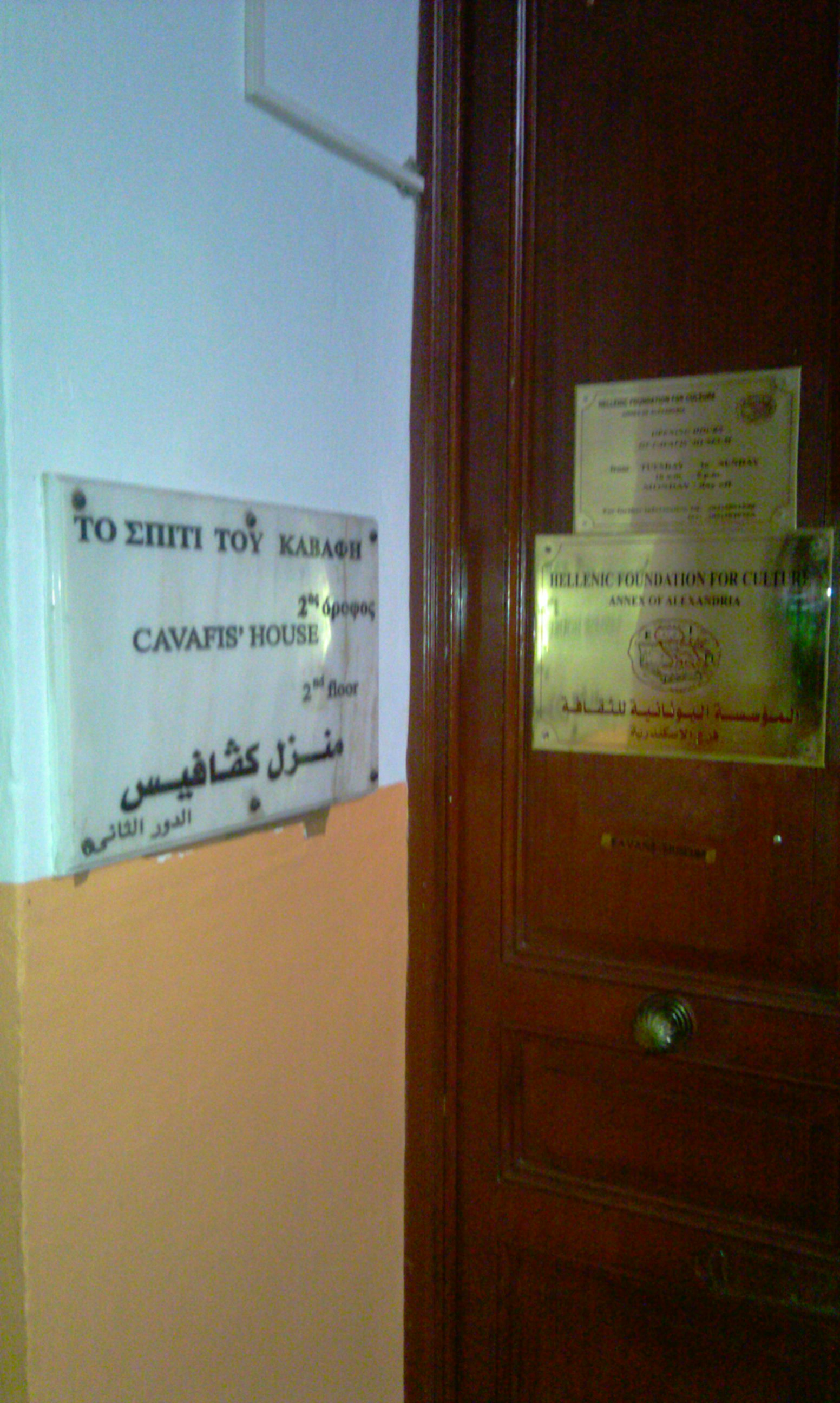
The Greek surname Cavafis in Egypt written as كڤافيس (kavafīs)

The character Ve (ڥ) is mapped in Unicode under position U+06A5. In Tunisia and Algeria the variant (ڥ) /v/ with three dots below is used instead to differentiate it from the letter /ɡ/ (ڨ). This usage might have been influenced by the Maghrebi archaic variant of Fāʾ (ڢ) with a dot below.

| Position in word: | Isolated | Final | Medial | Initial |
|---|---|---|---|---|
| Glyph form: (Help) | ڥ | ـڥ | ـڥـ | ڥـ |

== Gāf (ڨ) ==
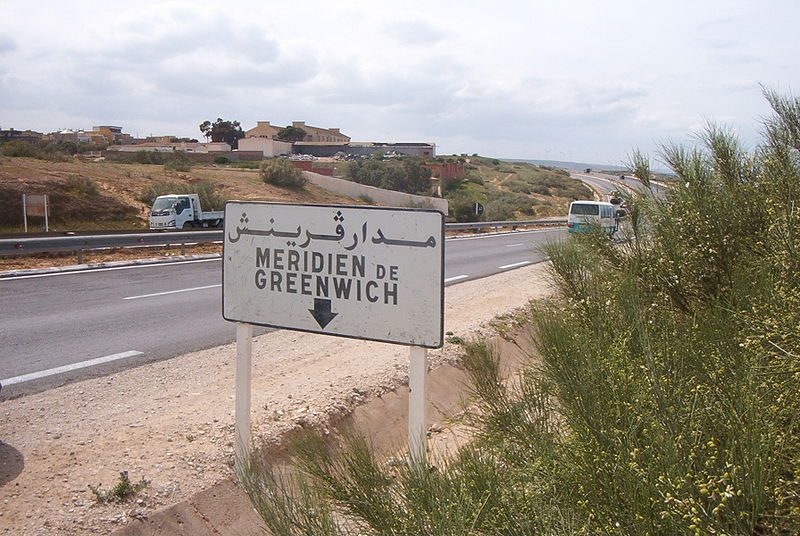
An Algerian sign transcribing Greenwich as ڨرينش (grīnish).

In Tunisian and in Algerian, Gāf (ڨ), similar look to Qāf (ق) but with three dots, is used for /ɡ/, such as in names of places or persons containing a voiced velar stop, as in Gafsa (ڨفصة) or Guelma (ڨالمة). If the usage of that letter is not possible for technical restrictions, Qāf (ق) is often used instead. In Arabic script representations of the Chechen language, Gāf (ڨ) is used to represent the uvular ejective /qʼ/, and /v/ in Hindko language (within Pakistan), called Vāf.

| Position in word: | Isolated | Final | Medial | Initial |
|---|---|---|---|---|
| Glyph form: (Help) | ڨ | ـڨ | ـڨـ | ڨـ |

== See also ==
- Če (ﭺ)
- Pe (پ)
- Gaf (گ)
- Ve (ۋ)
- Že (ژ)
