= States of India by Meitei speakers =

Distribution of Meitei language

Meitei language (officially known as Manipuri language), the sole official language and the lingua franca of Manipur, one of the scheduled languages of India, one of the recognised educational and literary languages of Assam and Tripura states, has its speakers spread across entire India.

Meitei language, along with Gujarati language, hold the third place among the fastest growing languages of India, following Hindi (first place) and Kashmiri language (second place), according to the 2011 census of India.

== 2011 census ==
State & Union territories	Population of speakers
India	1761079
Manipur	1522132
Assam	168133
Tripura	23779
Nagaland	9511
Meghalaya	4451
Karnataka	4103
NCT of Delhi	3892
Maharashtra	3475
Arunachal Pradesh	2835
Jammu & Kashmir	2370
Mizoram	2242
Rajasthan	2168
West Bengal	2010
Andhra Pradesh	1356
Uttar Pradesh	1204
Madhya Pradesh	1009
Tamil Nadu	928
Punjab	901
Haryana	563
Uttarakhand	490
Chandigarh	460
Kerala	444
Gujarat	408
Sikkim	383
Goa	367
Jharkhand	364
Odisha	306
Bihar	238
Chhattisgarh	202
Himachal Pradesh	188
Dadra & Nagar Haveli	<100
Andaman & Nicobar Islands	<100
Daman & Diu	<100
Puducherry	<100

== As a second language ==
According to the Ethnologue, in India, Meitei language is used as a second language (L2) by the various Naga ethnic groups and Kuki-Chin ethnic groups, including Aimol, Anal, Chiru, Chothe, Gangte, Hmar, Inpui, Kharam, Koireng, Kom, Lamkang, Mao, Maram, Monsang, Moyon, Purum, Tarao, Thadou (Chin people), Thangal Naga peoples.

== See also ==
- States of India by Bengali speakers
- States of India by Gujarati speakers
- States of India by Kashmiri speakers
- States of India by Malayalam speakers
- List of states and union territories of India by Punjabi speakers
- States of India by Sindhi speakers
- States of India by Kannada speakers
- States of India by Tamil speakers
- States of India by Telugu speakers
- States of India by Urdu speakers
