= States of India by Bengali speakers =

This is a list of States and Union Territories of India by Bengali speakers at the time of the 2011 Census.

According to 2011 census of India, Bengali is the fifth fastest growing language in India, following Hindi in the first place, Kashmiri in the second place, Gujarati in the third place, and Meitei (Manipuri) in the fourth place.

== 2011 Census ==
State / Union Territory	Bengali speakers	Percentage of population speaking Bengali
West Bengal	78,698,852	86.22%
Tripura	2,414,774	67.73%
Assam	9,024,652 (Note: Barak Valley has a population of 2,930,378 Bengali speakers while Brahmaputra Valley has a population of 6,094,274 Bengali speakers)	28.92% (Note: Barak Valley has 80.84% Bengali speakers while Brahmaputra Valley has 22.09% Bengali speakers)
Andaman & Nicobar Islands	108,432	28.49%
Jharkhand	3,213,423	9.73%
Mizoram	107,840	1.35%
Meghalaya	232,525	6.44%
Arunachal Pradesh	100,579	3.66%
Nagaland	74,753	3.78%
Daman & Diu	5,232	2.15%
Uttarakhand	150,933	1.50%
Delhi	215,960	1.29%
Odisha	504,570	1.20%
Sikkim	6,986	1.14%
Manipur	30,611	1.07%
Chhattisgarh	243,597	0.95%
Dadra and Nagar Haveli	3,116	0.91%
Bihar	810,771	0.78%
Chandigarh	6,236	0.59%
Goa	7,099	0.49%
Maharashtra	442,090	0.39%
Haryana	70,948	0.28%
Lakshadweep	1,509	0.22%
Madhya Pradesh	109,185	0.15%
Jammu & Kashmir	19,830	0.16%
Karnataka	87,963	0.14%
Gujarat	79,648	0.13%
Pondicherry	1,509	0.12%
Uttar Pradesh	241,007	0.12%
Rajasthan	81,658	0.12%
Punjab	27,030	0.10%
Himachal Pradesh	6,214	0.09%
Kerala	29,061	0.09%
Andhra Pradesh	57,804	0.07%
Tamil Nadu	22,969	0.03%
India	9,82,37,669 (First language speakers)	8.3%(Second most spoken in India)

== 2001 Census ==
State / Union Territory	Bengali speakers	Percentage of population speaking Bengali
West Bengal	68,369,255	85.34%
Tripura	2,147,944	67.14%
Assam	7,343,338	27.55%
Andaman & Nicobar Islands	91,582	25.71%
Jharkhand	2,607,601	9.68%
Mizoram	80,389	9.05%
Arunachal Pradesh	97,149	8.85%
Meghalaya	185,692	8.01%
Nagaland	58,890	2.96%
Delhi	208,414	1.50%
Uttarakhand	123,190	1.45%
Odisha	490,857	1.33%
Manipur	27,100	1.25%
Sikkim	6,320	1.18%
Daman & Diu	1,810	1.16%
Chhattisgarh	208,669	1.00%
Dadra and Nagar Haveli	1,382	0.63%
Chandigarh	5,491	0.61%
Bihar	443,425	0.53%
Maharashtra	310,137	0.32%
Goa	4,111	0.31%
Haryana	39,199	0.19%
Madhya Pradesh	105,399	0.17%
Jammu & Kashmir	14,416	0.14%
Pondicherry	1,180	0.12%
Uttar Pradesh	181,634	0.11%
Rajasthan	54,172	0.10%
Gujarat	40,780	0.08%
Himachal Pradesh	4,772	0.08%
Karnataka	41,256	0.08%
Punjab	20,655	0.08%
Andhra Pradesh	41,293	0.05%
Lakshadweep	24	0.05%
Kerala	3,387	0.01%
Tamil Nadu	8,805	0.01%
India	8,77,37,669 (First language speakers)	8.12%

== Bengali majority states of India ==
=== West Bengal ===
According to the provisional results of the 2011 national census, West Bengal is the fourth-most-populous state in India with a population of 91,347,736 (7.55% of India's population). Bengalis, consisting of Bengali Hindus, Bengali Muslims, Bengali Christians and a few Bengali Buddhists, numbering around 78,698,852 comprise about 86.22% of the state population. West Bengal was created as a homeland of Bengali Hindus in 1947.

=== Tripura ===
The non-tribal population of Tripura, the mostly Bengali-speaking Hindus and Muslims, constitute more than two-thirds of the state's population. The resident and the migrant Bengali population benefitted from the culture and language of the royal house of Tripura thanks to embracement of Hinduism and adoption of Bengali as the state language by the Maharajahs of Tripura much before Indian independence. After the Partition of India and Tripura's accession to the Dominion of India, thousands of Bengali Hindus from eastern Bengal took refuge in Tripura. The influx of the Bengali Hindus increased during the Bangladesh Liberation War, when of Bengali Hindus were massacred in Bangladesh by the Pakistani occupation army. At present there are around 2.2 million Bengali Hindus in Tripura, making them the largest ethnic group in the state, constituting over 60% of the total population.

=== Assam ===
A “language reversion” has been going on among Muslims who once migrated from erstwhile East Bengal. After Partition, the Brahmaputra valley Muslim migrants of East Bengali roots chose to report their language as Assamese. As a result, between 1931 and 1951, the population of Assamese speakers in Assam (excluding Sylhet) rose by a phenomenal 150%. The Partition violence may have played a part in this decision. The apprehension of being persecuted in the newly independent country made the migrants give up language and keep religion. As a mirror image of the quick rise in the Assamese speaking population, during 1931-1951 the population of Bengali speakers fell by as much as 25%. It is conjectured that of late, the Na-Axamiyas (the new Assamese) have been switching back to Bengali. This curious phenomenon was behind the Assam Movement (1979-1985) according to political scientist Myron Weiner. The relative calm of the last few decades since the conclusion of the movement may have given the migrants the confidence to report Bengali. The rise in the share of Bengalis could be due to Na-Axamiyas reverting to Bengali. In 1931, the population of Assamese speakers in the region was 1.74 million- which constituted 31.42% of the total population while by 1951, it turned into 4.55 million, constituting 56.69% of the population. According to 2011 census, Assam has around 31,205,576 people living in the state. Language census report tells that Assam has around 48.38% Assamese and 28.92% Bengali speakers as per 2011 census.

=== Andaman and Nicobar islands ===
There is also a significant number of Bengali Hindus residing in the Andaman and Nicobar Islands, estimated approximately 100,000 comprising 26%–28% of the population. Bengali is also the most widely spoken language in the Andaman and Nicobar Islands, despite it lacking official status.

== Other significant areas ==
=== Uttarakhand ===
There are large number of Bengali speaking population mainly centered around Udham Singh Nagar district of Uttarakhand. Much of the population reached here as a result of migration from East Pakistan / Bangladesh. The Bengali speakers are primarily engaged in farming and industrial activities. While Udham Singh Nagar district has 7.86% Bengali speaking population, its district headquarters Rudrapur has 13.1% Bengali speaking population.

=== Kerala ===
There is steady migration of Bengali speaking population from Assam and West Bengal towards southern state of Kerala as migrant labourers. As of 2020, Bengali speakers constitute a large proportion of migrant labourers in Kerala. Most of the Bengali speakers are working as footloose labourers and only a few consider permanent settlement. The major chunk of Bengali speaking populace is concentrated in Ernakulam district.

=== Chhattisgarh ===
In southern Chhattisgarh, especially in Bastar region there is significant Bengali speaking population. Most of these settlers have reached there as a result of Dandakaranya Project following the partition of India.

== See also ==
- States of India by Kashmiri speakers
- List of states and union territories of India by Punjabi speakers
- States of India by Sindhi speakers
- States of India by Kannada speakers
- States of India by Meitei speakers
- States of India by Tamil speakers
- States of India by Telugu speakers
- States of India by Urdu speakers
