= States of India by Kashmiri speakers =

Kashmiri speakers in India

Kashmiri language is an official language as well as one of the main spoken languages of Jammu and Kashmir, besides being one of the scheduled languages of India.

Just after Hindi, Kashmiri is the second fastest growing language of India, followed by Meitei (Manipuri) as well as Gujarati in the third place, and Bengali in the fourth place, according to the 2011 census of India.

== List ==
This is a list of States and Union Territories of India by speakers of Kashmiri according to the 2011 census. (Note: The figures includes speakers of Siraji, Kishtwari, Dardi and other dialects of Kashmiri or related languages.)

Rank	State	Kashmiri speakers
—	India	6,797,587
1	Jammu and Kashmir (state) (Note: This includes the combined stats for the current union territories of Ladakh and Jammu and Kashmir.)	6,680,837
2	Himachal Pradesh	57,050
3	Delhi	18,122
4	Maharashtra	8,274
5	Haryana	6,225
6	Uttar Pradesh	6,123
7	Rajasthan	4,164
8	Karnataka	3,388
9	Punjab	2,913
10	Uttarakhand	1,770
11	Chandigarh	1,330
12	Gujarat	1,111
13	Madhya Pradesh	1,050
14	Bihar	986
15	Kerala	651
16	West Bengal	624
17	Andhra Pradesh (1956–2014) (Note: This includes the combined stats for the current partitioned states of Telangana and Andhra Pradesh.)	576
18	Tamil Nadu	453
19	Goa	372
20	Assam	357
21	Jharkhand	296
22	Chhattisgarh	171
23	Odisha	140
24	Arunachal Pradesh	108
25	Andaman and Nicobar Islands	34
26	Sikkim	30
27	Puducherry	30
28	Dadra and Nagar Haveli and Daman and Diu	14

== See also ==
- States of India by Bengali speakers
- States of India by Meitei speakers
- States of India by Malayalam speakers
- List of states and union territories of India by Punjabi speakers
- States of India by Sindhi speakers
- States of India by Kannada speakers
- States of India by Tamil speakers
- States of India by Telugu speakers
- States of India by Urdu speakers
- States of India by urban population
- States of India by size of economy
