= Manpur =

Manpur may refer to:

- Manpur, Bhopal, a village in Madhya Pradesh, India
- Manpur, Bihar, a town in India
- Manpur, Indore, a town in Madhya Pradesh, India
- Manpur, Janakpur, Nepal
- Manpur, Jharkhand, a town in India
- Manpur, Khiron, a village in Uttar Pradesh, India
- Manpur, Lumbini, Nepal
- Manpur, Nepal (disambiguation), several places
- Manpur, Pakistan
- Manpur, Rapti, Nepal
- Manpur, Umaria, Madhya Pradesh, India
- Manpur Mainapokhar, Nepal
- Manpur Tapara, Nepal
- Bisunpurwa Manpur, Nepal

== See also ==
- Manipur (disambiguation)
