= Manpur, Nepal =

Manpur, Nepal may refer to:

- Manpur, Janakpur
- Manpur, Lumbini
- Manpur, Rapti

== See also ==
- Manpur (disambiguation)
