= States of India by Gujarati speakers =

Gujarati is the official language and the lingua franca of the Indian state of Gujarat as well as the union territory of Dadra and Nagar Haveli and Daman and Diu.

Gujarati, along with Meitei (alias Manipuri), hold the third place among the fastest growing languages of India, following Hindi (first place) and Kashmiri language (second place), according to the 2011 census of India.

== List ==
This is a list of States and Union Territories of India by speakers of Gujarati as of census 2001. Gross population figures are available online.

Rank	State	Gujarati speakers-2011	percentage
—	India	55,492,554	4.58% (Sixth most spoken in India)
1	Gujarat	51,958,730	85.97
2	Maharashtra	2,371,743	2.11
3	Tamil Nadu	275,023	
4	Madhya Pradesh	187,211	
5	Daman and Diu	123,648	50.83
6	Karnataka	114,616	
7	Rajasthan	67,490	
8	Dadra and Nagar Haveli	73,831	21.48
9	West Bengal	41,371	
10	Andhra Pradesh	58,946	
11	Delhi	40,613	
12	Chhattisgarh	39,116	
13	Kerala	4,710	
14	Jharkhand	22,109	
15	Orissa	14,856	
16	Goa	6,846	
17	Assam	7,660	
18	Punjab	13,531	
19	Haryana	7,519	
20	Jammu and Kashmir	19,261	
21	Chandigarh	1,573	
22	Himachal Pradesh	10,012	
23	Uttarakhand	3,921	
24	Tripura	1,384	
25	Puducherry	1,428	
26	Nagaland	277	
27	Arunachal Pradesh	362	
28	Andaman and Nicobar Islands	241	
29	Meghalaya	343	
30	Manipur	164	
31	Lakshadweep	24	
32	Sikkim	197	
33	Mizoram	59	
34	Bihar	8,297	
35	Uttar Pradesh	15,442	

== See also ==
- States of India by Kashmiri speakers
- States of India by Meitei speakers
- States of India by Bengali speakers
- States of India by urban population
- States of India by size of economy
