= Meitei Chanu =

Meitei Chanu (or, Meetei Chanu) literally means "Meitei woman" or "Meitei lady" in Meetei language. It may refer to:

- any woman (Chanu) of Meitei ethnicity (also known as Meetei ethnicity)
  - any Meitei woman using the Chanu (name suffix)
- Meitei Chanu (poem), a Meitei language poem by Lamabam Kamal, and the feminine personification of Meitei language (or Meitei literature) in the poem

== See also ==
- Meitei (disambiguation)
- Meetei
- Chanu (disambiguation)
