= Manipuri =

Manipuri may refer to:

- something of, from, or related to:
  - the modern-day Indian state of Manipur
  - the historical Manipur (princely state)
- Manipuri cuisine
- Manipuri dance, an Indian classical dance form
- Meitei language, the major language of the state
  - Manipuri script, a writing system used for the language
- Manipuri mythology (disambiguation)
- Manipuri people (disambiguation)
- Meitei people, the major ethnic group of the state
  - Meitei mythology
  - Meitei religion
- Manipuri religion (disambiguation)
- Manipuri Pony, a breed of horse

== See also ==
- Manipur (disambiguation)
- Meitei (disambiguation)
- Mainpuri, a place in Uttar Pradesh
- Manapouri, a town in Southland, New Zealand
