= Kangleipak (disambiguation) =

Kangleipak is the historic Meitei language word, or endonym, for the state of Manipur, India.

Kangleipak may also refer to:

- Kangleipak Communist Party, a political party in Manipur, India
- Kangleipak Communist Party (Maoist), a Maoist political party in Manipur, India
- Miss Kangleipak, a female bodybuilding competitio

== See also ==
- Kanglei mythology (disambiguation)
- Manipur (disambiguation)
