= Meitei =

Meitei may refer to:

- Meitei people, of Manipur, India
  - Meitei people in Bangladesh
  - Meitei people in India
    - Meitei people in Assam
    - Meitei people in Meghalaya
    - Meitei people in Tripura
  - Meitei people in Myanmar
  - Meitei women
- Meitei language or Manipuri, their Tibeto-Burman language
  - Meitei language in Bangladesh
  - Meitei language in India
    - Meitei language in Assam
    - Meitei language in Meghalaya
    - Meitei language in Tripura
  - Meitei language in Myanmar
  - Meitei literature
    - Ancient Meitei literature
  - Meitei script, the script used to write the language
    - Meitei script movement
    - Invented Meitei script
    - Meitei inscriptions
    - Meitei keyboard
- Meitei culture
  - Meitei architecture, architecture associated with the people
  - Meitei astronomy
  - Meitei cinema
  - Meitei dances
  - Meitei deities
  - Meitei festivals
  - Meitei folklore
  - Meitei folktales
  - Meitei mythology
  - Meitei philosophy
  - Meitei proverbs
  - Meitei religion

== Individual people ==
- Denechandra Meitei (born 1994), Indian footballer
- Loken Meitei (born 1997), Indian footballer
- Ningombam Bupenda Meitei (born 1987), Indian writer
- Romi Meitei, Indian film director
- Waikhom Gojen Meitei, Indian poet and educationist

== See also ==
- Manipuri (disambiguation)
