= Chanu (disambiguation) =

Chanu is a commune in north-western France. Chanu, Chonu or Channu may also refer to

- Chanu (name suffix)
- Chonu, a village in Iran
- Mian Channu Tehsil, an administrative subdivision in Pakistan
  - Mian Channu, a city and capital of Mian Channu Tehsil
