= Chenu =

Chenu may refer to:

== People ==
- Augustin Chenu (1833–1875), French painter
- Jean-Charles Chenu (1808–1879), French physician, naturalist and author
- Marie-Dominique Chenu (1895–1990), French Catholic theologian
- Peter Francis Chenu (1760–1834), British sculptor of French birth
- Sébastien Chenu (born 1973), French politician

== Places ==
- Chenu, Sarthe, France
- Chenu, Iran
