= List of Asian mythologies =

This is a list of mythologies native to Asia:

- Ainu creation myth
- Buddhist mythology
- Chinese mythology
- Christian mythology (in Western Asia)
- Georgian mythology
- Greek mythology (see Greco-Buddhism)
- Hindu mythology
  - Ayyavazhi mythology
  - Tamil mythology
  - Vedic mythology
- Hittite mythology and religion
- Indo-Iranian mythology
  - Ossetian mythology
  - Persian mythology
  - Scythian mythology
    - Assianism
  - Zoroastrianism
- Indonesian mythology
  - Balinese mythology
- Islamic mythology
- Japanese mythology
  - Oomoto
  - Shinto
- Kanglei mythology
- Korean mythology
- Meitei mythology (Manipuri mythology)
- Mesopotamian mythology
  - Ancient Mesopotamian religion
  - Babylonian mythology
- Mongol mythology
  - Tengriism (indigenous Mongol & Turkic belief)
- Philippine mythology
  - Diwata
  - Anito
  - Gabâ
  - Kulam
- Semitic mythology and
  - Arabian mythology
  - Jewish mythology
- Shamanism in Siberia
- Tungusic creation myth
- Turkic mythology
  - Tatar mythology
- Vietnamese mythology
