= Manipuri people (disambiguation) =

Manipur people may refer to:

- Meitei people
- People from the state of Manipur

== See also ==
- Manipuri (disambiguation)
- Meitei Pangals, also known as Meitei Muslims or the Manipuri Muslims
