= Manipur (disambiguation) =

Manipur is a state in northeastern India.

Manipur or Manipura may also refer to:

- Manipur (princely state), a former kingdom and princely state in northeastern India
- Manipura (Mahabharata), a coastal place mentioned in the ancient Indian epic Mahabharata
- Manipur River, a river in Manipur, India
- Manipur, Dahanu, a village in Maharashtra, India
- Mount Manipur, a mountain peak in Andaman and Nicobar Islands, India, named after the Indian state
- Manipura, a yogic chakra

== See also ==
- Manipuri (disambiguation)
- Manpur (disambiguation)
- Mani (disambiguation)
- Pur (disambiguation)
- "Sana Leibak Manipur", state song of Manipur, India
