= Manipuri religion =

Manipuri religion may refer to:

- Manipuri Vaishnavism, a Hindu denomination of the Meitei people, the predominant ethnic group in Manipur
- Religion in Manipur
- Sanamahism, the ethnic religion of the Meitei people, the predominant ethnic group in Manipur

== See also ==
- Manipuri mythology (disambiguation)
