= Manpur, Pakistan =

Village in Punjab, Pakistan

Manpur is a village in Sialkot District, Punjab, Pakistan.

== History ==
Sialkot became a part of the Muslim Sultanate of Delhi when the Afghan noble Sultan Shahab-ud-Din Muhammad Ghauri conquered Punjab in 1185. He was unable to conquer Lahore but left a garrison in Sialkot. Later, Sultan Khusro Malik unsuccessfully tried to capture the city. Sialkot then became a part of the Mughal Empire. The Mughal commander, Usman Ghani Raza, advanced towards Delhi by way of Sialkot which capitulated to his armies.

In 'Baburnama', Mughal emperor Babur records:

29th December: We dismounted at Sialkot. If one goes into Hindustan, the Jats and Gujars always pour down in countless hordes from hill and plain for loot in bullock and buffalo. These ill-omened peoples are senseless oppressors! Previously, their deeds did not concern us because the territory was an enemy's. But they did the same senseless deeds after we had captured it. When we reached Sialkot, they swooped on the poor and needy folk who were coming out of the town to our camp, and stripped them bare. I had the witless brigands apprehended, and ordered a few of them to be cut to pieces.

During the era of the Mughal Emperor, Jalal-ud-Din Muhammad Akbar, the present district of Sialkot formed a part of the Rachna-Bar Sarkar of the Lahore province. Under the reign of the Mughal Emperor, Shahab-ud-Din Muhammad Shah Jahan, Ali Mardan Khan held the charge of Sialkot.

At the end of the Mughal dynasty, the suburbs and the outlying districts and areas of Sialkot were left to themselves. Sialkot, itself, was appropriated by powerful families of Pashtuns from Multan, Afghanistan and Swat, the Kakayzai and Sherwani, and another family from Quetta. In 1748, the four districts of Gujrat, Sialkot, Pasrur and Daska were given to the Afghan Pashtun ruler, Ahmed Shah Durrani, and the area was amalgamated into the Afghan empire. After 1751, Ahmed Shah Durrani left his son, Taimur, to rule Lahore and these districts. During that time, Raja Ranjit Deo of Jammu expanded his domination over the peripheral areas, but the city of Sialkot was not included in it. Afterwards, the city was held strongly by a Pashtun clan till the occupation of the Sikhs who ruled for a period of about 40 years. The Pashtun presence is still considerable to this day and continues to attract newer Pashtun migrants and workers from Pakistan's tribal areas. After the decline of the Mughal Empire, the Sikh Empire invaded and occupied Sialkot. The Muslims faced restrictions during the Sikh rule.
