= Manipur, Dahanu =

Village in Maharashtra

Manipur
- village
- Location in Maharashtra, India Manipur (India)
- Coordinates: 19.975781°N 72.8367776°E
- Country: India
- State: Maharashtra
- District: Palghar
- Taluka: Dahanu
- Elevation: 52 m (171 ft)

Population (2011)
  - Total: 1,458
- Time zone: UTC+5:30 (IST)
- 2011 census code: 551670

Manipur is a village in the Palghar district of Maharashtra, India. It is located in the Dahanu taluka.

== Demographics ==
According to the 2011 census of India, Manipur has 293 households. The effective literacy rate (i.e. the literacy rate of population excluding children aged 6 and below) is 30.36%.

Demographics (2011 Census)
	Total	Male	Female
Population	1458	718	740
Children aged below 6 years	302	154	148
Scheduled caste	15	8	7
Scheduled tribe	1378	675	703
Literates	351	212	139
Workers (all)	792	388	404
Main workers (total)	591	327	264
Main workers: Cultivators	89	37	52
Main workers: Agricultural labourers	345	188	157
Main workers: Household industry workers	8	7	1
Main workers: Other	149	95	54
Marginal workers (total)	201	61	140
Marginal workers: Cultivators	35	9	26
Marginal workers: Agricultural labourers	130	33	97
Marginal workers: Household industry workers	0	0	0
Marginal workers: Others	36	19	17
Non-workers	666	330	336
