= Manipuri mythology (disambiguation) =

Manipuri mythology is the mythology of the Meitei people, the predominant ethnic group in Manipur, India.

Manipuri mythology may also refer to:

- Mythologies of other ethnic groups in Manipur
- Mythology associated with Manipura, a kingdom in the Mahabharata

== See also ==
- Kanglei mythology (disambiguation)
- Manipuri religion (disambiguation)
