= Manpur, Jharkhand =

Village in Jharkhand, India

Coordinates: 23.65°N 86.40°E

Manpur is a village in Chandankiyari CD Block of Bokaro district of the Indian State of Jharkhand, near the city of Bokaro.
