= Meitei input methods =

Meitei input methods are the methods that allow users of computers and mobile devices to input text in the Meitei script.

== Gboard ==
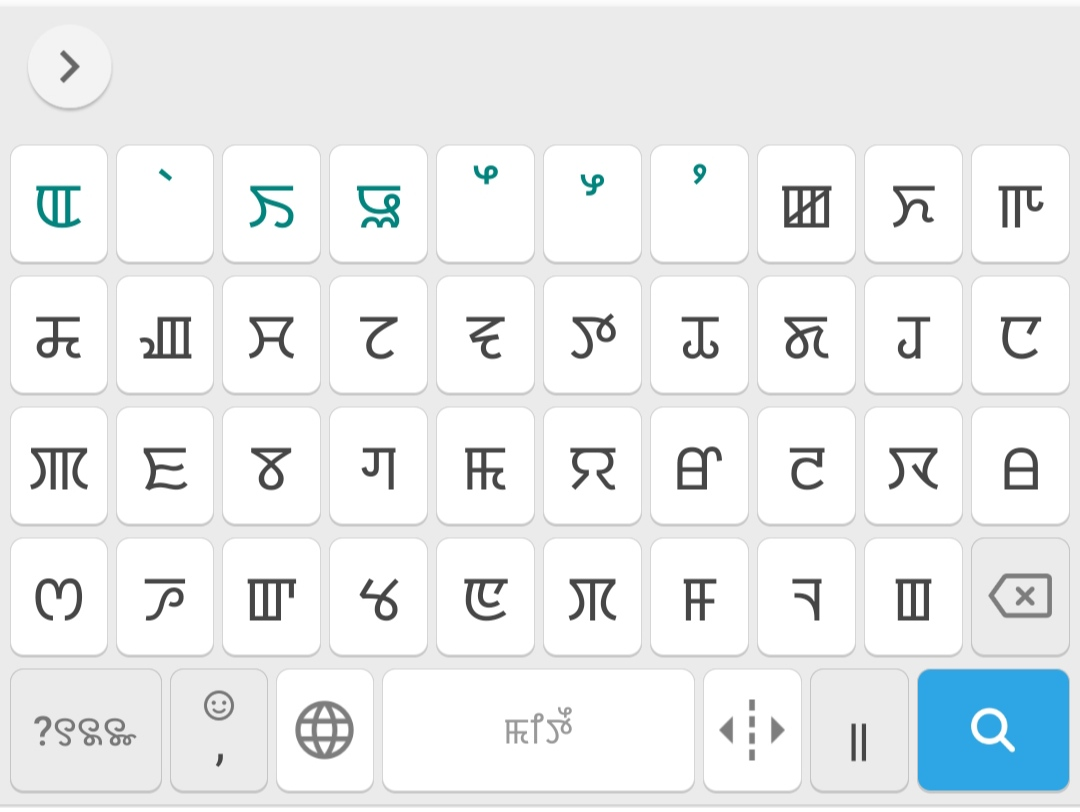
Meitei Mayek Gboard

The Meitei Mayek Gboard has most of the Unicode characters for the script but it still has some issues. Some characters including (apun), (onap), (eenap/inap) and (lum) are missing. Standard and historical characters are mixed up.

== Apple iOS 13 ==
The Apple iOS 13 keyboard system supports the Manipuri language in both Meetei Mayek (Meetei script) as well as Bengali script. Apple users can go to Settings> General>Keyboards>Keyboards> and then tap on Add New Keyboard.

== Google Translate ==
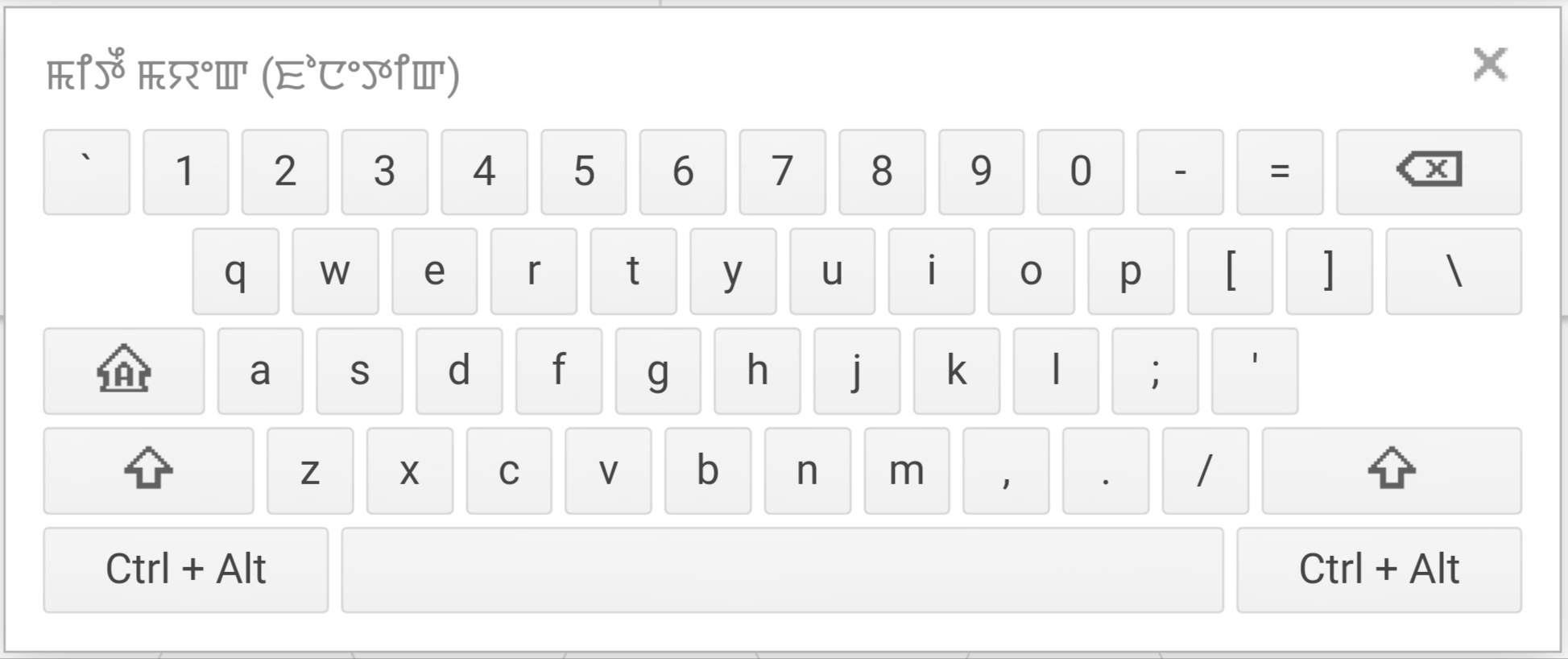
Google Translate Meetei Mayek Phonetic Keyboard

Google Translate supports the phonetic keyboard to type the characters of the Meitei script.

== Linux ==
The Linux software system can render the Meitei Mayek keyboard. To install it, the font file (EPAOMAYEK.ttf) should be copied to fonts:/// in the File Manager of the user.

== Macintosh operating systems ==
Mac OS can render the Meitei Mayek keyboard, in various forms. It can be installed under Mac OS X as follows : font file (EPAOMAYEK.ttf) >> /Library/Fonts (for all users), or >> /Users/Your_username/Library/Fonts (for your personal use only). If the Font Book is present in the user's OS, then: double-click on a font file >> a preview pops with an "Install font" button. It can also be installed under Mac OS 9 or less as follows: the fonts suitcases should be dragged into the System folder and should be added to the Fonts folder

== Microsoft SwiftKey keyboard ==
In the year 2015, the Microsoft SwiftKey keyboard supported Meitei (Manipuri), during its addition of 9 new Indian languages to the software system.

== Windows ==
The Manipuri Keyboard or Meitei Mayek Keyboard on the Windows was developed by Nongthonbam Tonthoi. Its version is 1.6.0. It can be installed on the Windows by using Android App Players like BlueStacks, Nox, KOPlayer, etc.

It can be installed under the Windows Vista as follows : Select the font file (EPAOMAYEK.ttf) >> Right-click >> Install. It can also be installed under any version of Windows as follows : Place the font file (EPAOMAYEK.ttf) into the Fonts folder, usually C:\Windows\Fonts or C:\WINNT\Fonts (or by the Start Menu >> Control Panel >> Appearance and Themes >> Fonts).

== See also ==
- Meetei Mayek (Unicode block)
- Meetei Mayek Extensions (Unicode block)
- Wikipedia:Meitei script display help
- List of Meitei-language newspapers
- Meitei inscriptions
