= Chonu =

Chonu چنو
- Village
- Location within Iran
- Coordinates: 35°11′06″N 47°00′14″E
- Country: Iran
- Province: Kurdistan
- County: Sanandaj
- Bakhsh: Central
- Rural District: Naran

Population (2006)
  - Total: 185
- Time zone: UTC+3:30 (IRST)
  - Summer (DST): UTC+4:30 (IRDT)

Chonu (Persian: چنو, also Romanized as Chonū, Chanoo, Chanū, and Chenū) is a village in Naran Rural District, in the Central District of Sanandaj County, Kurdistan Province, Iran. At the 2006 census, its population was 185, in 48 families. The village is populated by Kurds.
