= Manpur, Dang =

Coordinates: 28°4′N 82°22′E

Manpur, Sahipur, Nepal मानपुर साहीपुर
- Village Development Committee
- Interactive map of Manpur, Sahipur, Nepal
- Country: Nepal
- Province: Lumbini Province
- District: Dang Deokhuri District

Population (1991)
  - Total: 9,962
- Time zone: UTC+5:45 (Nepal Time)

Manpur, Sahipur is a town and Village Development Committee in Dang Deokhuri District in Lumbini Province of south-western Nepal. At the time of the 1991 Nepal census it had a population of 9,960 persons residing in 1449 individual households.
