= Chanu (name suffix) =

Chanu (Meitei: /cə.nu/) is a Meitei ethnic name suffix for women. The term "Chanu" literally means "a girl of a clan" in Meitei language (officially called Manipuri language). Notable people using this name suffix are:

- Irom Chanu Sharmila (born 1972), Indian civil rights activist and poet
- Khumukcham Sanjita Chanu (born 1994), Indian weightlifter
- Lily Chanu Paonam (born 1988), Indian archer
- Ngangbam Soniya Chanu (born 1980), Indian weightlifter
- Renu Bala Chanu (born 1986), Indian weightlifter
- Saikhom Mirabai Chanu (born 1994), Indian weightlifter
- Sanamacha Chanu (born 1978), Indian weightlifter
- Sanggai Chanu (born 1981), Indian field hockey player
- Sushila Chanu (born 1992), Indian field hockey player
- Tingonleima Chanu (born 1976), Indian field hockey player
