= States of India by Malayalam speakers =

This is a list of states and territories of India by number of people for whom Malayalam is their mother tongue (first language) as of census 2001. Gross population figures are

Rank	State/ Union territory	1981 census			1991 census			2001 census			2011 census		
Rank	State/ Union territory	Malayalam speakers	% of state	% of Malayalam	Malayalam speakers	% of state	% of Malayalam	Malayalam speakers	% of state	% of Malayalam	Malayalam speakers	% of state	% of Malayalam
—	India	25,952,966	3.92%	100%	30,377,176	3.62%	100%	33,066,392	3.21%	100%	34,838,819	2.88% (Tenth most spoken in India)	100%
1	Kerala	24,231,396	95.99%	93.37%	28,096,376	96.56%	92.49	30,803,747	96.75%	93.16	32,413,213	97.03%	93.04
2	Tamil Nadu	577,890	1.20%	2.23%	661,137	1.18%	2.18	557,705	0.90%	1.69	774,057	1.01%	2.22
3	Karnataka	590,709	1.60%	2.28%	757,030	1.68%	2.49	701,673	1.33%	2.12	726,096	1.27%	2.08
4	Maharashtra	220,871	0.36%	0.85%	340,597	0.43%	1.12	406,358	0.42%	1.23	366,153	0.33%	1.05
5	Delhi	31,143	0.50%	0.12%	64,952	0.69%	0.21	92,009	0.66%	0.28	88,662	0.53%	0.25
6	Gujarat	30,610	0.09%	0.12%	57,701	0.14%	0.19	67,838	0.13%	0.21	64,998	0.11%	0.19
7	Andhra Pradesh/ Telangana	44,489	0.08%	0.17%	66,409	0.10%	0.22	62,214	0.08%	0.19	61,147	0.07%	0.18
8	Lakshadweep	33,559	84.51%	0.13%	43,678	84.47%	0.14	51,555	84.10%	0.16	54,264	84.17%	0.16
9	Madhya Pradesh	59,928	0.11%	0.23%	80,759	0.12%	0.27	48,515	0.08%	0.15	37,761	0.05%	0.11
10	Puducherry	30,886	5.15%	0.12%	38,392	4.75%	0.13	42,782	4.39%	0.13	47,973	3.84%	0.14
11	Rajasthan	12,679	0.04%	0.05%	26,450	0.06%	0.09	33,975	0.06%	0.10	24,439	0.04%	0.07
12	Andaman and Nicobar Islands	18,662	10.43%	0.07%	26,075	9.29%	0.09	28,869	8.09%	0.09	27,475	7.22%	0.08
13	Chhattisgarh	-	-	-	-	-	-	26,319	0.13%	0.08	23,370	0.09%	0.07
14	Uttar Pradesh	5,410	0.01%	0.02%	15,721	0.01%	0.05	19,683	0.01%	0.06	24,450	0.01%	0.07
15	West Bengal	10,478	0.02%	0.04%	17,215	0.03%	0.06	17,043	0.02%	0.05	10,952	0.01%	0.03
16	Goa	7,634	0.72%	0.03%	12,962	1.10%	0.04	15,081	1.12%	0.05	12,983	0.89%	0.04
17	Haryana	4,423	0.03%	0.02%	8,038	0.05%	0.03	13,989	0.07%	0.04	14,518	0.06%	0.04
18	Odisha	13,536	0.05%	0.05%	16,246	0.05%	0.05	10,440	0.03%	0.03	9,004	0.02%	0.03
19	Jammu and Kashmir	1,135	0.02%	0.00%	n/a	n/a	n/a	10,063	0.10%	0.03	11,248	0.09%	0.03
20	Punjab	3,591	0.02%	0.01%	7,139	0.04%	0.02	10,669	0.04%	0.03	9,734	0.04%	0.03
21	Jharkhand	-	-	-	-	-	-	8,783	0.03%	0.03	6,549	0.02%	0.02
22	Assam	n/a	n/a	n/a	3,575	0.02%	0.01	8,141	0.03%	0.02	5,768	0.02%	0.02
23	Arunachal Pradesh	2,164	0.36%	0.01%	5,046	0.58%	0.02	5,583	0.50%	0.02	4,012	0.29%	0.01
24	Nagaland	2,414	0.32%	0.01%	4,493	0.37%	0.01	3,901	0.20%	0.01	2,916	0.15%	0.01
25	Uttarakhand	-	-	-	-	-	-	2,870	0.03%	0.01	3,168	0.03%	0.01
26	Chandigarh	1,639	0.37%	0.01%	2,435	0.38%	0.01	2,356	0.26%	0.01	1,979	0.01%	0.01
27	Meghalaya	914	0.07%	0.00%	2,142	0.12%	0.01	2,000	0.09%	0.01	1,789	0.06%	0.01
28	Dadra and Nagar Haveli	286	0.28%	0.00%	803	0.58%	0.00	1,839	0.83%	0.01	2,172	0.63%	0.01
29	Tripura	208	0.01%	0.00%	1,231	0.05%	0.00	1,747	0.05%	0.01	1,173	0.03%	0.00
30	Mizoram	532	0.11%	0.00%	1,375	0.20%	0.00	1,322	0.15%	0.00	718	0.07%	0.00
31	Manipur	409	0.03%	0.00%	1,792	0.10%	0.01	1,231	0.05%	0.00	1,519	0.06%	0.00
32	Himachal Pradesh	1,034	0.03%	0.00%	1,257	0.02%	0.00	1,231	0.02%	0.00	1,211	0.02%	0.00
33	Daman and Diu	-	-	-	283	0.28%	0.00	1,166	0.74%	0.00	1,229	0.50%	0.00
34	Sikkim	577	0.19%	0.00%	710	0.18%	0.00	1,021	0.19%	0.00	899	0.15%	0.00
35	Bihar	13,760	0.02%	0.00%	15,157	0.02%	0.05	2,674	0.00%	0.01	1,220	0.00%	0.00
