= Kanglei mythology =

Kanglei mythology is the collection of myths originally told by the people of Kangleipak (currently Manipur), India. It may refer to:

- Meitei mythology, the mythology of the Meitei people, one of the ethnic groups in Kangleipak
- Mythologies of other ethnic groups in Kangleipak

== See also ==
- Manipuri mythology (disambiguation)
