= Kashmiri language =

Indo-Aryan language spoken in Kashmir

Kashmiri
- کٲشُر; कॉशुर; 𑆑𑆳𑆯𑆶𑆫𑇀
- The word "Koshur" in Perso-Arabic script (contemporary, official status), Sharada script (ancient, liturgical) and Devanagari
- Native to: India and Pakistan
- Region: Kashmir (Kashmir Valley and surrounding areas of Jammu and Kashmir, parts of northern Azad Kashmir)
- Ethnicity: Kashmiris
- Native speakers: 7.1 million (2011)
- Language family: Indo-European: Indo-Iranian; Indo-Aryan; Eastern Dardic; Kashmiri
- Dialects: Kishtwari; Poguli
- Writing system: Official: Perso-Arabic script (contemporary); Others: Devanagari (informally used by some sections within the Kashmiri Pandit community after 1990), Sharada script (ancient/liturgical)

Official status
- Official language in: India: Jammu and Kashmir

Language codes
- ISO 639-1: ks
- ISO 639-2: kas
- ISO 639-3: kas
- Glottolog: kash1277
- Kashmiri is classified as Vulnerable by the UNESCO Atlas of the World's Languages in Danger

Kashmiri (English: /kæʃˈmɪəri/ kash-MEER-ee), also known by its endonym Koshur (Kashmiri: کٲشُر (Perso-Arabic, Official Script), pronounced [kəːʃur]), is an Indo-Aryan language of the Dardic branch spoken by around 7 million Kashmiris of the Kashmir region, primarily in the Kashmir Valley and surrounding hills of the Indian-administrated union territory of Jammu and Kashmir, over half the population of that territory. Kashmiri has split ergativity and the unusual verb-second word order.

Since 2020, it has been made an official language of Jammu and Kashmir along with Dogri, Hindi, Urdu and English. Kashmiri is also among the 22 scheduled languages of India.

Kashmiri is spoken by roughly five percent of Pakistani-administrated Azad Kashmir's population.

== Geographic distribution and status ==
There are about 6.8 million speakers of Kashmiri and related dialects in Jammu and Kashmir and amongst the Kashmiri diaspora in other states of India. Most Kashmiri speakers are located in the Kashmir Valley and other surrounding areas of Jammu and Kashmir. In the Kashmir Valley, Kashmiri speakers form the majority.

The Kashmiri language is one of the 22 scheduled languages of India. It was a part of the Eighth Schedule in the former constitution of Jammu and Kashmir. Along with other regional languages mentioned in the Sixth Schedule, as well as Hindi and Urdu, the Kashmiri language was to be developed in the state. After Hindi, Kashmiri is the second fastest growing language of India, followed by Meitei (Manipuri) as well as Gujarati in the third place, and Bengali in the fourth place, according to the 2011 census of India.

Persian began to be used as the court language in Kashmir during the 14th centuries, under the influence of Islam. It was replaced by Urdu in 1889 during the Dogra rule. In 2020, Kashmiri became an official language in the Union Territory of Jammu and Kashmir for the first time. Poguli and Kishtwari are closely related to Kashmiri, which are spoken in the mountains to the south of the Kashmir Valley and have sometimes been counted as dialects of Kashmiri.

Kashmiri is spoken by roughly five percent of Azad Kashmir's population. According to the 1998 Pakistan Census, there were 132,450 Kashmiri speakers in Azad Kashmir. Native speakers of the language were dispersed in "pockets" throughout Azad Kashmir, particularly in the districts of Muzaffarabad (15%), Neelam (20%) and Hattian (15%), with very small minorities in Haveli (5%) and Bagh (2%). The Kashmiri spoken in Muzaffarabad is distinct from, although still intelligible with, the Kashmiri of the Neelam Valley to the north. In Neelam Valley, Kashmiri is the second most widely spoken language and the majority language in at least a dozen or so villages, where in about half of these, it is the sole mother tongue. The Kashmiri dialect of Neelum is closer to the variety spoken in northern Kashmir Valley, particularly Kupwara. At the 2017 Census of Pakistan, as many as 350,000 people declared their first language to be Kashmiri.

A process of language shift is observable among Kashmiri-speakers in Azad Kashmir according to linguist Tariq Rahman, as they gradually adopt local languages such as Pahari-Pothwari, Hindko or move towards the lingua franca Urdu. This has resulted in these languages gaining ground at the expense of Kashmiri. There have been calls for the promotion of Kashmiri at an official level; in 1983, a Kashmiri Language Committee was set up by the government to patronise Kashmiri and impart it in school-level education. However, the limited attempts at introducing the language have not been successful, and it is Urdu, rather than Kashmiri, that Kashmiri Muslims of Azad Kashmir have seen as their identity symbol. Rahman notes that efforts to organise a Kashmiri language movement have been challenged by the scattered nature of the Kashmiri-speaking community in Azad Kashmir.

== Phonology ==
Kashmiri has a very large phoneme inventory: 32 vowels and 62 consonants, giving that vowel nasalization and consonant palatalization are phonemic and not phonetic. It has the following phonemes.

=== Vowels ===
The oral vowels are as follows:

	Front	Central	Back
High	i iː	ɨ ɨː	u uː
Mid	e eː	ə əː	o oː
Low		a aː	ɔ ɔː

The short high vowels are near-high, and the low vowels apart from /aː/ are near-low.

Nasalization is phonemic. All sixteen oral vowels have nasal counterparts.

=== Consonants ===
		Bilabial	Dental	Alveolar	Retroflex	Post-alv./ palatal	Velar	Glottal
Nasal		m	n					
Stop/ affricate	voiceless	p	t	t͡s	ʈ	t͡ʃ	k	
Stop/ affricate	aspirated	pʰ (Note: [pʰ] is in free variation with [f].)	tʰ	t͡sʰ	ʈʰ	t͡ʃʰ	kʰ	
Stop/ affricate	voiced	b	d		ɖ	d͡ʒ	ɡ	
Fricative	voiceless			s		ʃ		h
Fricative	voiced			z				
Approximant		ʋ	l			j		
Trill			r					

Palatalization is phonemic. All consonants apart from those in the post-alveolar/palatal column have palatalized counterparts.

=== Archaisms ===
Kashmiri, as also the other Dardic languages, shows important divergences from the Indo-Aryan mainstream. One is the partial maintenance of the three sibilant consonants s ṣ ś of the Old Indo-Aryan period. For another example, the prefixing form of the number 'two', which is found in Sanskrit as dvi-, has developed into ba-/bi- in most other Indo-Aryan languages, but du- in Kashmiri (preserving the original dental stop d). Seventy-two is dusatath in Kashmiri, bahattar in Hindi-Urdu and Punjabi, and dvisaptati in Sanskrit.

=== Morphophonology ===
Kashmiri displays several morphophonological changes. These changes are as follows:

- The lowering of the vowels [ə], [əː], and [uː] to [a], [aː], and [oː] respectively in the presence of the plural suffixes -[i] or -[ɨ]
- The raising of the vowels [a], [aː] to [ə] and [əː] respectively in monosyllabic stems in the presence of suffixes beginning with [i]
- The centralizing of the vowels [u], [uː], [o], and [oː] to [ɨ], [ɨː], [ə], and [əː] respectively in the presence of suffixes beginning with -[i] or -[j]
- The second vowel [u] of CVCVC words becoming [a] when forming the plural
- Stem-final retroflex consonants [ʈ], [ʈʰ], and [ɖ] become [t͡ʃ], [t͡ʃʰ], and [d͡ʒ] respectively in the presence of the plural suffix -[i]
- Stem-final dental stops [t̪], [t̪ʰ], and [d̪] become [t͡s], [t͡sʰ], and [z] respectively when forming the feminine form of a word
- [k], [kʰ], and [ɡ] become [t͡ʃ], [t͡ʃʰ], and [d͡ʒ] respectively when forming the feminine form of a word
- [l] becomes [d͡ʒ] when forming the feminine form of a word
- Stem-final aspirated stops become deaspirated in the presence of suffixes beginning with vowels

== Writing system ==
There are three orthographical systems used to write the Kashmiri language: the Perso-Arabic script, the Devanagari script and the Sharada script. The Roman script is also sometimes informally used to write Kashmiri, especially online.

The Kashmiri language was traditionally written in the Sharada script from the 8th Century AD onwards. Between the 8th and the first quarter of the 20th century AD, Sharada was the primary script of inscriptional and literary production in Kashmir. It was used to write Sanskrit, Kashmiri and other languages of northern South Asia. With increased use of Persian script for writing Kashmiri in the 19th century AD, and the growth of other brahmic scripts such as Devanagari and Takri, the use of Sharada declined. The Sharada script is inadequate for writing modern Kashmiri because it lacks sufficient signs to represent Kashmiri vowels. Modern usage of Sharada is limited to religious ceremonies and rituals of Kashmiri Pandits, and for horoscope-writing by them.

Today Kashmiri is primarily written in Perso-Arabic (with some modifications, such as additions of new signs to represent Kashmiri vowels). Among languages written in the Perso-Arabic script, Kashmiri is one of the scripts that regularly indicates all vowel sounds.

The Kashmiri Perso-Arabic script is recognized as the official script of Kashmiri language by the Jammu and Kashmir government and the Jammu and Kashmir Academy of Art, Culture and Languages. The Kashmiri Perso-Arabic script has been derived from Persian alphabet. The consonant inventory and their corresponding pronunciations of Kashmiri Perso-Arabic script doesn't differ from Perso-Arabic script, with the exception of the letter ژ, which is pronounced as /t͡s/ instead of /ʒ/. However, the vowel inventory of Kashmiri is significantly larger than other Perso-Arabic derived or influenced South Asian Perso-Arabic scripts. There are 17 vowels in Kashmiri, shown with diacritics, letters (alif, waw, ye), or both. In Kashmiri, the convention is that most vowel diacritics are written at all times.

Despite Kashmiri Perso-Arabic script cutting across religious boundaries and being used by both the Kashmiri Hindus and the Kashmiri Muslims, some attempts have been made to give a religious outlook regarding the script and make Kashmiri Perso-Arabic script to be associated with Kashmiri Muslims, while the Kashmiri Devanagari script to be associated with some sections of Kashmiri Hindu community.

=== Perso-Arabic script ===
==== Consonants ====
Name	Forms				IPA	Transliteration	Unicode	Example		
Kashmiri	Isolated	Final	Medial	Initial	IPA	Transliteration	Unicode	Kashmiri word	IPA	Meaning
ألِف ạlif	ا	ـا	ـا	ا	/∅/, silent (Note: At the beginning of a word it can either come with diacritic, or it can be stand-alone and silent, succeeded by a vowel letter. Diacritics اَ اِ، اُ can be omitted in writing. Other diacritics (i.e. آ، أ، ٲ، إ، اٟ) are never omitted. For example, اَخبار "akhbār" is often written as اخبار, whereas أچھ " ȧchh" is never written as اچھ.)	–	U+0627	اَفسانہٕ afsānü	/afsaːnɨ/	Short story
بے bē	ب	ـب	ـبـ	بـ	/b/	b	U+0628	بِکھٲرؠ bikhạ̄r'	/bikʰəːrʲ/	Beggar
پے pē	پ	ـپ	ـپـ	پـ	/p/	p	U+067E	پَمپوش pampōsh	/pampoːʃ/	Lotus flower
پھَ pha	پھ	ـپھ	ـپھـ	پھـ	/pʰ/	ph	U+067E and U+06BE	پھَل phal	/pʰal/	Fruit
تے tē	ت	ـت	ـتـ	تـ	/t̪/	t	U+062A	تَجويٖز tajvīz	/t̪ad͡ʒʋiːz/	Proposal
تھَ tha	تھ	ـتھ	ـتھـ	تھـ	/t̪ʰ/	th	U+062A and U+06BE	تھٲلؠ thạ̄l'	/t̪ʰəːlʲ/	Plate
ٹے ṭē	ٹ	ـٹ	ـٹـ	ٹـ	/ʈ/	ṭ	U+0679	ٹوٗپؠ ṭūp'	/ʈuːpʲ/	Cap
ٹھَ ṭha	ٹھ	ـٹھ	ـٹھـ	ٹھـ	/ʈʰ/	ṭh	U+0679 and U+06BE	ٹھوٗل ṭhūl	/ʈʰuːl/	Egg
ثے sē	ث	ـث	ـثـ	ثـ	/s/	s	U+062B	ثۆبوٗتھ sobūth	/sobuːt̪ʰ/	Proof
جیٖم jīm	ج	ـج	ـجـ	جـ	/d͡ʒ/	j	U+062C	جاے jāy	/d͡ʒaːj/	Place
چیٖم chīm	چ	ـچ	ـچـ	چـ	/t͡ʃ/	ch, č	U+0686	چٲنٛدؠ chạ̄n̂d'	/t͡ʃə̃ːd̪ʲ/	Silver
چھَ chha	چھ	ـچھ	ـچھـ	چھـ	/t͡ʃʰ/	chh, čh	U+0686 and U+06BE	چھان chhān	/t͡ʃʰaːn/	Carpenter
حَے hay	ح	ـح	ـحـ	حـ	/h/	h	U+062D	حاجَتھ ḥājath	/haːd͡ʒat̪ʰ/	Need
خَے k͟hay	خ	ـخ	ـخـ	خـ	/x/~/kʰ/	k͟h, kh	U+062E	خَطَرناكھ k͟hatarnākh	/xatarnaːkʰ/	Dangerous
دال dāl	د	ـد	ـد	د	/d̪/	d	U+062F	دُكان dukān	/d̪ukaːn/	Shop
ڈال ḍāl	ڈ	ـڈ	ـڈ	ڈ	/ɖ/	ḍ	U+0688	ڈۄڈ ḍọḍ	/ɖɔɖ/	One and a half
ذال zāl	ذ	ـذ	ـذ	ذ	/z/	z	U+0630	ذیٚہَن zehan	/zehan/	Mind
رے rē	ر	ـر	ـر	ر	/r/	r	U+0631	رٕكھ rükh کھرٛۄکھ khrọkh	/rɨkʰ/ /kʰrɔkʰ/	Line Snore
ڑے ṛē	ڑ	ـڑ	ـڑ	ڑ	/ɽ/	ṛ	U+0691	لٔڑکہٕ lạṛkü	/ləɽkɨ/	Boy
زے zē	ز	ـز	ـز	ز	/z/	z	U+0632	زامَن zāman	/zaːman/	Yawn
ژے tsē	ژ	ـژ	ـژ	ژ	/t͡s/	ts	U+0698	ژٔر tsạr	/t͡sər/	House sparrow
ژھَ tsha	ژھ	ـژھ	ـژھـ	ژھـ	/t͡sʰ/	tsh	U+0698 and U+06BE	ژھاے tshāy	/t͡sʰaːj/	Shadow
سیٖن sīn	س	ـس	ـسـ	سـ	/s/	s	U+0633	سَنٛگُر sangur	/sãɡur/	Mountain
شـیٖـن shīn	ش	ـش	ـشـ	شـ	/ʃ/	sh, š	U+0634	شۆد shod	/ʃod̪/	Pure, Genuine
صۄاد sọ̄d	ص	ـص	ـصـ	صـ	/s/	s	U+0635	صَدقہٕ sadqü	/sad̪qɨ/	Charity
ضۄاد zọ̄d	ض	ـض	ـضـ	ضـ	/z/	z	U+0636	ضٲمیٖن zạ̄mīn	/zəːmiːn/	Responsible, guarantor
طۄے tọy	ط	ـط	ـطـ	طـ	/t̪/	t	U+0637	طوطہٕ tōtü	/t̪oːt̪ɨ/	Parrot
ظۄے zọy	ظ	ـظ	ـظـ	ظـ	/z/	z	U+0638	ظٲلِم zạ̄lim	/zəːlim/	Cruel
عٲن ạ̄n	ع	ـع	ـعـ	عـ	/∅/, silent (Note: Used mainly for Arabic loanwords.)	–	U+0639	عَقٕل aqül	/aqɨl/	Wisdom
غٲن ġạ̄n	غ	ـغ	ـغـ	غـ	/ɣ/~/ɡ/	ġ, g, ğ	U+063A	غۄصہٕ ġọsü	/ɣɔsɨ/	Anger
فے fē	ف	ـف	ـفـ	فـ	/f/~/pʰ/	f	U+0641	فِرِنـؠ firin'	/firinʲ/	Sweet pudding
قاف qāf	ق	ـق	ـقـ	قـ	/q/~/k/	q	U+0642	قاشوٕ qāshwü	/qaːʃʋɨ/	Spoon
كیٖف kīf	ک	ـک	ـكـ	كـ	/k/	k	U+0643	کۄکُر kọkur	/kɔkur/	Chicken
کھَ kha	کھ	ـکھ	ـکھـ	کھـ	/kʰ/	kh	U+0643 and U+06BE	کھۄر khọr	/kʰɔr/	Foot
گاف gāf	گ	ـگ	ـگـ	گـ	/ɡ/	g	U+06AF	گاش gāsh	/ɡaːʃ/	Light
لام lām	ل	ـل	ـلـ	لـ	/l/	l	U+0644	لۄکچار lọkchār	/lɔkt͡ʃaːr/	Childhood
میٖم mim	م	ـم	ـمـ	مـ	/m/	m	U+0645	مَرٕگ marüg	/marɨɡ/	Meadow
نوٗن nūn	ن	ـن	ـنـ	نـ	/n/, /◌̃/, /ŋ/	n	U+0646	نَب nab	/nab/	Sky
نوٗن غۄنَہ nūn gọna	ں	ـں			/◌̃/	ñ	U+06BA	داں زٔمیٖن dāñ zạmīn	/d̪ãː zəmiːn/	Paddy field
واو wāw	و	ـو	ـو	و	/ʋ/ (Note: The letter wāw can either represent consonant ([ʋ]) or vowel ([oː]). It can also act as a carrier of vowel diacritics, representing several other vowels وٗ, ۆ, ۄ (uː], [o], [ɔ]). At the beginning of a word, when representing a consonant, the letter wāw will appear as a standalone character, followed by the appropriate vowel. If representing a vowel at the beginning of a word, the letter wāw needs to be preceded by an ạlif, او, اوٗ, اۆ, اۄ.)	v, w	U+0648	وَن van	/ʋan/	Forest
ہے hē	ہ	ـہ	ـہـ	ہـ	/h/ (Note: This letter differs from do-chashmi hē (ھ) and they are not interchangeable. Similar to Urdu,do-chashmi hē (ھ) is exclusively used as a second part of digraphs for representing aspirated consonants.) (Note: In initial and medial position, the letter hē always represents the consonant [h]. In final position, The letter hē can either represent consonant ([h]) or vowel ([a]). In final position, only in its attached form, and not in isolated form, it can also act as a carrier of vowel diacritics, representing several other vowels ـٔہ, ـہٕ ([ə], [ɨ]). For example, whereas a final "-rạ" is written as ـرٔ, a final "-gạ" is written as ـگٔہ.)	h	U+06C1	ہۄپہٕ họpü ؤہمہٕ wạhmü پَگاہ pagāh	/hɔpɨ/ /ʋəhmɨ/ /paɡaːh/	Chubby Fear, anxiety Tomorrow
یے yē	ی	-	ـیـ	یـ	/j/ (Note: The letter yē can either represent consonant ("y" [j]) or vowel ("ē" [eː] or "ī" [iː]). The letter yē can represent [j] in initial or medial position, or it can represent "ē" [eː] or "ī" [iː] in medial positions, or "ī" [iː] in final position. In combination with specific diacritics, the letter yē in its medial position, can represent "ī" [iː], "e" [e], "ĕ" [ʲa], or ' [◌ʲ] as well. To represent the consonant "y" [j] or the vowel "ē" [eː] in final position, the letter boḍ yē (ے) is used. The letter boḍ yē (ے), in combination with specific diacritics, can represent "e" [e] in final position.)	y	U+06CC	یال yāl پیٛالہٕ pyālü	/jaːl/ /pʲaːlɨ/	Hair of horse Cup
لۄکُٹ یے; Lọkuṭ yē	ی	-	ـیـ	یـ	/j/	y	U+06CC	یال yāl پیٛالہٕ pyālü	/jaːl/ /pʲaːlɨ/	Hair of horse Cup
بۆڈ یے boḍ yē	ے	ـے	-	-	/j/ (Note: The letter boḍ yē only occurs in final position. The letter boḍ yē represents the consonant "y" [j] or the vowel "ē" [eː]. With specific diacritics, vowel "e" [e] is also shown with the letter boḍ yē.)	y	U+06D2	ڈاے ḍāy	/ɖaːj/	Two and a half
تالٕرؠ tālür'	ؠ	ـؠ	ـؠ	-	/◌ʲ/	', ⁱ	U+0620	سٟتؠ sǖt'	/sɨːt̪ʲ/	With

==== Vowels ====
Name	Final vowel glyph (vowel and letters bē ب and rē ر)	Medial vowel glyph (vowel and letters bē ب and rē ر)	Initial vowel glyph	IPA	Transliteration	Unicode	Example		
Kashmiri	Final vowel glyph (vowel and letters bē ب and rē ر)	Medial vowel glyph (vowel and letters bē ب and rē ر)	Initial vowel glyph	IPA	Transliteration	Unicode	Kashmiri word	IPA	Meaning
زَبَر zabar	َ، ـہ بَہ / ـبَہ / رَ	–َ بَـ / ـبَـ / رَ	اَ	[a]	a	U+064E	اَپُز apuz پَلَو palav	/apuz/ /palaʋ/	Lie Garments, clothes
مَد mad	ا با / ـبا / را	ا با / ـبا / را	آ	[aː]	ā	U+0622; U+0627	آب āb پان pān	/aːb/ /paːn/	Water Body
اَمالہٕ amālü	–ٔ / ـٔہ بٔہ / ـبٔہ / رٔ	–ٔ بٔـ / ـبٔـ / رٔ	أ	[ə]	ạ, ö, ȧ	U+0623; U+0654	أچھ ạchh گٔر gạr	/ət͡ʃʰ/ /ɡər/	Eye Clock, watch
اَمالہٕ مَد amālü mad	ٲ بٲ / ـبٲ / رٲ	ٲ بٲ / ـبٲ / رٲ	ٲ	[əː]	ạ̄, ȫ, ä	U+0672	ٲس ạ̄s دٲن dạ̄n	/əːs/ /d̪əːn/	Mouth Pomegranate
زیر zēr	–ِ / ـہِ بہِ / ـبہِ / رِ	–ِ بِـ / ـبِـ / رِ	اِ	[i]	i, í	U+0650	اِنسان insān سِر sir	/insaːn/ /sir/	Human being Secret
کَشہِ زیر kashi zēr	ی بی / ـبی / ری	ـیٖـ / یٖـ بیٖـ / ـبیٖـ / ریٖـ	ایٖـ / ای	[iː]	ī	Initial and Medial: U+06CC and U+0656; Final: U+06CC	ایٖمان īmān سیٖر sīr وَردی wardī	/iːmaːn/ /siːr/ /ʋard̪iː/	Faith Brick Uniform
سایہِ sāyi	–ٕ / ـہٕ بہٕ / ـبہٕ / رٕ	–ٕ بٕـ / ـبٕـ / رٕ	إ	[ɨ]	ü, ụ, u', ι	Initial: U+0625; Medial and Final: U+0655	بہٕ bü کٔدٕل kạdül	/bɨ/ /kəd̪ɨl/	I Bridge
سایہِ مَد sāyi mad	–ٟ / ـہٟ بہٟ / ـبہٟ / رٟ	–ٟ بٟـ / ـبٟـ / رٟ	ٳ	[ɨː]	ǖ, ụ̄, ū'	Initial: U+0673; Medial and Final: U+065F	تٟر tǖr خٟمہٕ k͟hǖmü	/t̪ɨːr/ /xɨːmɨ/	Cold Tent
پیش pēsh	–ُ / ـُہ بُہ / ـبُہ / رُ	–ُ بُـ / ـبُـ / رُ	اُ	[u]	u	U+064F	پُج puj	/pud͡ʒ/	Butcher
کَشہِ واوُک kashi wāwuk	ـوٗ / وٗ بوٗ / ـبوٗ / روٗ	ـوٗ / وٗ بوٗ / ـبوٗ / روٗ	اوٗ	[uː]	ū	U+0648 and U+0657	پوٗت pūt	/puːt̪/	Chick
نیٖمہٕ واوُک nīmü wāwuk	ـۆ / ۆ بۆ / ـبۆ / رۆ	ـۆ / ۆ بۆ / ـبۆ / رۆ	اۆ	[o]	o, ó	U+06C6	دۆب dob	/d̪ob/	Washerman
واوُک wāwuk	ـو / و بو / ـبو / رو	ـو / و بو / ـبو / رو	او	[oː]	ō	U+0648	مور mōr	/moːr/	Peacock
لٔٹؠ واوُک lạṭ' wāwuk	ـۄ / ۄ بۄ / ـبۄ / رۄ	ـۄ / ۄ بۄ / ـبۄ / رۄ	اۄ	[ɔ]	ọ, ŏ	U+06C4	گۄلاب gọlāb	/ɡɔlaːb/	Rose
لٔٹؠ واوُک مَد lạṭ' wāwuk mad	ـۄا / ۄا بۄا / ـبۄا / رۄا	ـۄا / ۄا بۄا / ـبۄا / رۄا	اۄا	[ɔː]	ọ̄, ŏa	U+06C4 and U+0627	سۄاد sọ̄d	/sɔːd̪/	One and a quarter
نیٖمہٕ یایُک nīmü yāyuk	ـےٚ / ـےٚ بےٚ / ـبےٚ / رےٚ	ـێـ / ێـ بیٚـ / ـبیٚـ / ریٚـ	ایٚـ / اےٚ	[e]	e, ë	Initial and Medial: U+06CC and U+065A; Final: U+06D2 and U+065A	بیٚنہِ beni مےٚ me	/beni/ /me/	Sister Me, I
یایُک yāyuk	ـے / ے بے / ـبے / رے	ـیـ / یـ بیـ / ـبیـ / ریـ	ایـ / اے	[eː]	ē	Initial and Medial: U+06CC; Final: U+06D2	ریش rēsh	/reːʃ/	Beard
گول یایُک gōl yāyuk	-	ـؠـ / ؠـ بؠـ / ـبؠـ / رؠـ	اؠـ / اؠے	[ʲa]	ya, ĕ	Initial and Medial: U+0620	مؠقراض myaqrāz	/mʲaqraːz/	Scissors

=== Devanagari script ===
==== Consonants ====
Letter	IPA	Transliteration
क	[k]	k
ख	[kʰ]	kh
ग	[g]	g
च	[t͡ʃ]	ch
छ	[t͡ʃʰ]	chh
ज	[d͡ʒ]	j
च़	[t͡s]	ts
छ़	[t͡sʰ]	tsh
ज़	[z]	z
ट	[ʈ]	ṭ
ठ	[ʈʰ]	ṭh
ड	[ɖ]	ḍ
त	[t]	t
थ	[tʰ]	th
द	[d]	d
न	[n]	n
प	[p]	p
फ	[pʰ]	ph
ब	[b]	b
म	[m]	m
य	[j]	y
र	[r]	r
ल	[l]	l
व	[ʋ]	w
श	[ʃ]	sh
स	[s]	s
ह	[h]	h

==== Vowels ====
There have been a few versions of the Devanagari script for Kashmiri. The 2002 version of the proposal is shown below. This version has readers and more content available on the Internet, even though this is an older proposal. This version makes use of the vowels ॲ/ऑ and vowel signs कॅ/कॉ for the schwa-like vowel [ə] and elongated schwa-like vowel [əː] that also exist in other Devanagari-based scripts such as Marathi and Hindi but are used for the sound of other vowels.

Letter	IPA	Transliteration	Vowel mark indicated on consonant k
अ	[a]	a	क
आ	[aː]	ā	का
ॲ	[ə]	ạ	कॅ
ऑ	[əː]	ạ̄	कॉ
इ	[i]	i	कि
ई	[iː]	ī	की
ॶ	[ɨ]	ü	कॖ
ॷ	[ɨː]	ǖ	कॗ
उ	[u]	u	कु
ऊ	[uː]	ū	कू
ऎ	[e]	e	कॆ
ए	[eː]	ē	के
ऐ	[əi]	ai	कै
ऒ	[o]	o	कॊ
ओ	[oː]	ō	को
औ	[ɔː]	ọ̄	कौ
-व	[ɔ]	ọ	क्व or कव
ं	[◌̃]	˜	कं

Tabulated below is the latest (2009) version of the proposal to spell the Kashmiri vowels with Devanagari. The primary change in this version is the changed stand alone characters ॳ / ॴ and vowel signs कऺ / कऻ for the schwa-like vowel [ə] & elongated schwa-like vowel [əː] and a new stand alone vowel ॵ and vowel sign कॏ for the open-mid back rounded vowel [ɔ] which can be used instead of the consonant व standing-in for this vowel.

Letter	IPA	Transliteration	Vowel mark indicated on consonant k
अ	[a]	a	क
आ	[aː]	ā	का
ॳ	[ə]	ạ	कऺ
ॴ	[əː]	ạ̄	कऻ
इ	[i]	i	कि
ई	[iː]	ī	की
ॶ	[ɨ]	ü	कॖ
ॷ	[ɨː]	ǖ	कॗ
उ	[u]	u	कु
ऊ	[uː]	ū	कू
ऎ	[e]	e	कॆ
ए	[eː]	ē	के
ऐ	[əi]	ai	कै
ऒ	[o]	o	कॊ
ओ	[oː]	ō	को
औ	[ɔː]	ọ̄	कौ
ॵ	[ɔ]	ọ	कॏ
ं	[◌̃]	˜	कं

=== Sharada script ===
==== Consonants ====
Name		Transliteration	IPA	Isolated glyph	Remarks
𑆑𑆾𑆮𑇀 𑆑	kōv kạ	ka	[ka]	𑆑	
𑆒𑇀𑆮𑆤𑆴 𑆒	khvani khạ	kha	[kʰa]	𑆒	
𑆓𑆓𑆫𑇀 𑆓	gagar gạ	ga	[ɡa]	𑆓	
𑆓𑆳𑆱𑆴 𑆔	gāsi ghạ	gha	[ɡʰa]	𑆔	Modern Kashmiri does not possess this consonant.
𑆤𑆳𑆫𑆶𑆓𑇀 𑆕	nārug ṅạ	ṅa	[ŋa]	𑆕	Modern Kashmiri does not possess this consonant.
𑆖𑆳𑆛𑆶𑆮𑇀 𑆖	tsāṭuv chạ	cha	[t͡ʃa]	𑆖	
𑆗𑇀𑆮𑆛𑆴𑆚𑇀 𑆗	tshvaṭiñ chhạ	chha	[t͡ʃʰa]	𑆗	
𑆘𑆪𑆴 𑆘	zayi jạ	ja	[d͡ʒa]	𑆘	
𑆘𑆳𑆯𑆴𑆚𑇀 𑆙	zashiñ jhạ	jha	[d͡ʒʰa]	𑆙	Modern Kashmiri does not possess this consonant.
𑆒𑇀𑆮𑆤 𑆦𑆶𑆛𑆴 𑆚	khvana phuṭi ñạ	ña	[ɲa]	𑆚	Modern Kashmiri does not possess this consonant.
𑆃𑆫𑇀-𑆩𑆳𑆀𑆛	ar mām̐ṭa	ṭa	[ʈa]	𑆛	
𑆱𑆫𑇀-𑆩𑆳𑆀𑆜	sar mām̐ṭha	ṭha	[ʈʰa]	𑆜	
𑆝𑆶𑆝𑇀 𑆝	ḍuḍ ḍạ	ḍa	[ɖa]	𑆝	
𑆝𑆑 𑆞	ḍaka ḍhạ	ḍha	[ɖʰa]	𑆞	Modern Kashmiri does not possess this consonant.
𑆤𑆳𑆤𑆓𑆶𑆫𑆴 𑆟	nānaguri ṇạ	ṇa	[ɳa]	𑆟	Modern Kashmiri does not possess this consonant.
𑆠𑆾𑆮𑇀 𑆠	tov tạ	ta	[ta]	𑆠	
𑆡𑆳𑆯𑆴 𑆡	thāshi thạ	tha	[tʰa]	𑆡	
𑆢𑆢𑆮𑇀 𑆢	dadav dạ	da	[da]	𑆢	
𑆢𑆷𑆚𑇀 𑆣	dūñ dhạ	dha	[dʰa]	𑆣	Modern Kashmiri does not possess this consonant.
𑆤𑆱𑇀𑆠𑆶𑆮𑇀 𑆤	nastūv nạ	na	[na]	𑆤	
𑆥𑆝𑆶𑆫𑆴 𑆥	paḍuri pạ	pa	[pa]	𑆥	
𑆦𑆫𑆴𑆚𑇀 𑆦	phariñ phạ	pha	[pʰa]	𑆦	
𑆧𑆶𑆧𑇀 𑆧	bub bạ	ba	[ba]	𑆧	
𑆧𑆳𑆪𑆴 𑆨	bāyi bhạ	bha	[bʰa]	𑆨	Modern Kashmiri does not possess this consonant.
𑆩𑆾𑆮𑇀 𑆩	mōv mạ	ma	[ma]	𑆩	
𑆪𑆳𑆮 𑆪	yāva yạ	ya	[ja]	𑆪	
𑆫𑆑 𑆫	raka rạ	ra	[ra]	𑆫	
𑆬𑆳𑆮 𑆬	lāva lạ	la	[la]	𑆬	
𑆧𑆝𑆶 𑆝𑆶𑆝𑇀 𑆝	boḍu ḍuḍ ḍạ	ḷa	[ɭa]	𑆭	Modern Kashmiri does not possess this consonant.
𑆮𑆯𑆴 𑆮	vashi vạ	va	[ʋa]	𑆮	
𑆯𑆑𑆫𑇀 𑆯	shakar shạ	sha	[ʃa]	𑆯	
𑆦𑆳𑆫𑆴 𑆰	phāri ṣạ	ṣa	[ʂa]	𑆰	Modern Kashmiri does not possess this consonant.
𑆱𑆶𑆱𑇀 𑆱	sus sạ	sa	[sa]	𑆱	
𑆲𑆳𑆬 𑆲	hala hạ	ha	[ha]	𑆲	

==== Vowels ====
Name		Transliteration	IPA	Isolated glyph	Remarks
𑆄𑆢𑆿 𑆃	ādau a	a	[a]	𑆃	
𑆎𑆠𑆮𑇀 𑆄	aitav ā	ā	[aː]	𑆄	
𑆪𑆪𑆮𑇀 𑆪𑆼	yeyev yē	i	[i]	𑆅	
𑆅𑆯𑆫𑆮𑇀 𑆆	yisherav yī	ī	[iː]	𑆆	
𑆮𑇀𑆮𑆥𑆬𑇀 𑆮𑆾	vọpal vō	u	[u]	𑆇	
𑆮𑇀𑆮𑆥𑆬𑇀 𑆧𑆳 𑆈	vọpal bā ū	ū	[uː]	𑆈	
𑆉𑆤𑆮𑇀 𑆉	r̥enav	r̥	[r̩]	𑆉	Modern Kashmiri does not possess this vowel.
𑆫𑆒𑆮𑇀 𑆊	rakhav	r̥̄	[r̩ː]	𑆊	Modern Kashmiri does not possess this vowel.
𑆬𑇀𑆪𑆪𑆮𑇀 𑆋	leyev	l̥	[l̩]	𑆋	Modern Kashmiri does not possess this vowel.
𑆬𑆵𑆪𑆮𑇀 𑆌	līsav	l̥̄	[l̩ː]	𑆌	Modern Kashmiri does not possess this vowel.
𑆠𑆬𑆮𑇀𑆪𑇀 𑆍	talavya yē	ē	[eː]	𑆍	
𑆠𑆳𑆬𑆵 𑆎	tolī ai	ai	[əi]	𑆎	
𑆮𑆶𑆜𑆾 𑆏	vuṭhō ō	ō	[oː]	𑆏	
𑆃𑆯𑆴𑆢𑆵 𑆐	ashidī au	au	[ɔː]	𑆐	
𑆃𑆝𑆴 𑆖𑆤𑆢𑇀𑆫 𑆦𑇀𑆪𑆫𑆶	aḍi tsandra phyor	am̐	[◌̃]	𑆃𑆀	
𑆩𑆱𑇀 𑆦𑇀𑆪𑆫𑆴 𑆃𑆁	mas phyori aṃ	aṃ	[n], [m]	𑆃𑆁	
𑆢𑆾 𑆦𑇀𑆪𑆫𑆴 𑆃𑆂	dō phyori aḥ	aḥ	[h]	𑆃𑆂	

Vowel mark

Name		Transliteration	IPA	Isolated vowel mark	Vowel mark indicated on consonant pa	Distinct ways of indicating vowel marks on special consonants
𑆮𑆲𑆳𑆪𑇀	vahāy	-ā	[aː]	𑆳	𑆥𑆳	𑆕 = 𑆕𑆳 𑆘 = 𑆘𑆳 𑆛 = 𑆛𑆳 𑆟 = 𑆟𑆳
𑆩𑆷𑆤𑇀𑆡𑆫𑇀	mūnthar	-i	[i]	𑆴	𑆥𑆴	
𑆃𑆫𑇀 𑆩𑆷𑆤𑇀𑆡𑆫𑇀	ar mūnthar	-ī	[iː]	𑆵	𑆥𑆵	
𑆒𑆶𑆫𑆶	khuru	-u	[u]	𑆶	𑆥𑆶	𑆑 = 𑆑𑆶 𑆓 = 𑆓𑆶 𑆙 = 𑆙𑆶 𑆚 = 𑆚𑆶 𑆝 = 𑆝𑆶 𑆠 = 𑆠𑆶 𑆨 = 𑆨𑆶 𑆫 = 𑆫𑆶 𑆯 = 𑆯𑆶
𑆃𑆫𑇀 𑆒𑆷𑆫𑆷	ar khūrū	-ū	[uː]	𑆷	𑆥𑆷	𑆑 = 𑆑𑆷 𑆓 = 𑆓𑆷 𑆙 = 𑆙𑆷 𑆚 = 𑆚𑆷 𑆝 = 𑆝𑆷 𑆠 = 𑆠𑆷 𑆨 = 𑆨𑆷 𑆫 = 𑆫𑆷 𑆯 = 𑆯𑆷
𑆉𑆤𑆮𑇀 𑆉	r̥enav r̥a	-r̥	[r̩]	𑆸	𑆥𑆸	𑆑 = 𑆑𑆸
𑆫𑆒𑆮𑇀 𑆊	rakhav ru	-r̥̄	[r̩ː]	𑆹	𑆥𑆹	𑆑 = 𑆑𑆹
𑆬𑇀𑆪𑆪𑆮𑇀 𑆋	leyev l̥a	-l̥	[l̩]	𑆺	𑆥𑆺	
𑆬𑆵𑆱𑆮𑇀 𑆌	līsav l̥̄a	-l̥̄	[l̩ː]	𑆻	𑆥𑆻	
𑆲𑇀𑆮𑆁𑆝𑆷	hvanḍū	-ē	[eː]	𑆼	𑆥𑆼	
𑆲𑇀𑆮𑆁𑆘𑆾𑆫𑇀	hvanjōr	-ai	[əi]	𑆽	𑆥𑆽	
𑆃𑆑𑆶 𑆯𑇀𑆪𑆷𑆫𑆶	oku shyūr	-ō	[oː]	𑆾	𑆥𑆾	
𑆃𑆑𑆶𑆯𑆴 𑆮𑆲𑆳𑆪𑇀	okushi vahāy	-au	[ɔː]	𑆿	𑆥𑆿	
𑆃𑆝𑆴 𑆖𑆤𑇀𑆢𑇀𑆫 𑆦𑇀𑆪𑆫𑆶	aḍi tsandra phyor	-am̐	[◌̃]	𑆀	𑆥𑆀	
𑆩𑆱𑇀 𑆦𑇀𑆪𑆫𑆴 𑆃𑆁	mas phyori aṃ	-aṃ	[n], [m]	𑆁	𑆥𑆁	
𑆢𑆾 𑆦𑇀𑆪𑆫𑆴 𑆃𑆂	dō phyori aḥ	-aḥ	[h]	𑆂	𑆥𑆂	

Kashmiri specific vowels for contemporary use with script were added in September 2025 with the release of version 17.0.

They are in the Sharada Supplement block, which is U+11B60–U+11B7F:

Sharada Supplement^{[1]}^{[2]} Official Unicode Consortium code chart (PDF)
	0	1	2	3	4	5	6	7	8	9	A	B	C	D	E	F
U+11B6x	𑭠	𑭡	𑭢	𑭣	𑭤	𑭥	𑭦	𑭧								
U+11B7x																
Notes 1.As of Unicode version 18.0 2.Grey areas indicate non-assigned code points

== Grammar ==
Kashmiri is a fusional language with verb-second (V2) word order. Several of Kashmiri's grammatical features distinguish it from other Indo-Aryan languages.

=== Nouns ===
Kashmiri nouns are inflected according to gender, number and case. There are no articles, nor is there any grammatical distinction for definiteness, although there is some optional adverbial marking for indefinite or "generic" noun qualities.

==== Gender ====
The Kashmiri gender system is divided into masculine and feminine. Feminine forms are typically generated by the addition of a suffix (or in most cases, a morphophonemic change, or both) to a masculine noun. A relatively small group of feminine nouns have unique suppletion forms that are totally different from the corresponding masculine forms. The following table illustrates the range of possible gender forms:

Process	Masculine	Feminine	Meaning
-en’ suffix	[d̪ukaːnd̪aːr] دُکاندار	[d̪ukaːnd̪aːrenʲ] دُکانداریٚنؠ	shopkeeper
-bāy suffix	[maːʃʈar] ماشٹَر	[maːʃʈarbaːj] ماشٹَر باے	teacher
-in’ + vowel change	[xar] خَر	[xərinʲ] خٔرِنؠ	donkey
-ür + vowel change	[pʰot̪] پھۆت	[pʰɔt̪ɨr] پھۄتٕر	basket
Adding of affix	[huːn] ہوٗن	[huːnʲ] ہوٗنؠ	dog/bitch
vowel change	[ɡaɡur] گَگُر	[ɡaɡɨr] گَگٕر	rat
consonant change	[hokʰ] ہۆکھ	[hot͡ʃʰ] ہۆچھ	dry
vowel/consonant change	[t̪ot̪] تۆت	[t̪ət͡s] تٔژ	hot
suppletive form	[marɨd̪] مَرٕد	[zanaːnɨ] زَنانہٕ	man/woman
masculine only	[kʲom] کیٛۆم	---	insect
feminine only	---	[mət͡ʃʰ] مٔچھ	housefly

Some nouns borrowed from other languages, such as Persian, Arabic, Sanskrit, Urdu or English, follow a slightly different gender system. Notably, many words borrowed from Urdu have different genders in Kashmiri.

==== Case ====
There are five cases in Kashmiri: nominative, dative, ergative, ablative and vocative. Case is expressed via suffixation of the noun.

Kashmiri utilizes an ergative-absolutive case structure when the verb is in simple past tense. Thus, in these sentences, the subject of a transitive verb is marked in the ergative case and the object in nominative, which is identical to how the subject of an intransitive verb is marked. However, in sentences constructed in any other tense, or in past tense sentences with intransitive verbs, a nominative-dative paradigm is adopted, with objects (whether direct or indirect) generally marked in dative case. Other case distinctions, such as locative, instrumental, genitive, comitative and allative, are marked by postpositions rather than suffixation.

==== Noun morphology ====
The following table illustrates Kashmiri noun declension according to gender, number and case.

	Masculine		Feminine	
	singular	plural	singular	plural
Nom.	-Ø	-Ø	-Ø	-Ø
Erg.	-[an] اَن	-[aʋ] اَو	-[i] اِ	-[aʋ] اَو
Dat.	-[as] or -[is] اَس or اِس	-[an] اَن	-[i] اِ	-[an] اَن
Abl.	-[i] or -[ɨ] اِ or إ	-[aʋ] اَو	-[i] اِ	-[aʋ] اَو
Voc.	-[aː] ا	-[aʋ] اَو	-[i] اِ	-[aʋ] اَو

The plural forms of nouns often involve stem changes. These changes are listed below.

- Masculine plurals:
  - In CVC forms, [o] becomes [ə]
    - Example: [moːl] مول 'father' → [məːlʲ] مٲلؠ 'fathers'
  - In CVCVC forms, [u] becomes [ɨ]
    - Example: [lat͡sʰul] لَژھُل 'broom' → [lat͡sʰɨlʲ] لَژھٕلؠ 'brooms'
  - In (C)VCVC forms, [u] in the second syllable becomes [a]
    - Example: [ɡaɡur] گَگُر 'rat' → [ɡaɡar] گَگَر 'rats'
  - Masculine plurals will use the same form as the singular if the final vowel is [ɨ], in CVC form with a central vowel, or is a loanword from Hindustani or English.
    - Example: [at̪ʰɨ] اَتھٕ 'hand' → [at̪ʰɨ] اَتھٕ 'hands'
    - Example: [bʲamaːr] بؠمار 'sick person' → [bʲamaːr] بؠمار 'sick people'
- Feminine plurals:
  - In CVC(C) forms, the final vowel becomes lowered unless if it is [u]
    - Example: [nər] نٔر 'arm' → [nari] نَرِ 'arms'
  - Final retroflex consonants become palatal
    - Example: [ləʈ] لٔٹ 'tail' → [lat͡ʃi] لَچہِ 'tails'
  - In CVCVC forms, the final [ɨ] is deleted
    - Example: [gɔgɨd͡ʒ] گۄگٕج 'turnip' → [gɔgd͡ʒi] گۄگجہِ 'turnips'
  - Final [t̪ʰ] becomes [t͡s] along with the preceding vowel raising
    - Example: [raːt̪ʰ] راتھ 'night' → [rəːt͡s] رٲژ 'nights'
  - Some feminine CVC forms use the suffix -[ɨ] إ instead of -[i] اِ
    - Example: [kat̪ʰ] کَتھ 'story' → [kat̪ʰɨ] کَتھٕ 'stories'
  - Some feminine nouns of native origin do not change for plurality
    - Example: [ət͡ʃʰ] أچھ 'eye' → [ət͡ʃʰ] أچھ 'eyes'

=== Verbs ===
Kashmiri verbs are declined according to tense and person, and to a lesser extent, gender. Tense, along with certain distinctions of aspect, is formed by the addition of suffixes to the verb stem (minus the infinitive ending - /un/), and in many cases by the addition of various modal auxiliaries. Postpositions fulfill numerous adverbial and semantic roles.

==== Tense ====
Present tense in Kashmiri is an auxiliary construction formed by a combination of the copula and the imperfective suffix -/aːn/ added to the verb stem. The various copula forms agree with their subject according to gender and number, and are provided below with the verb /jun/ (to come):

Present
	Masculine	Feminine
1st person sing.	[t͡ʃʰus jiʋaːn] چھُس یِوان	[t͡ʃʰas jiʋaːn] چھَس یِوان
2nd person sing.	[t͡ʃʰukʰ jiʋaːn] چھُکھ یِوان	[t͡ʃʰakʰ jiʋaːn] چھَکھ یِوان
3rd person sing.	[t͡ʃʰu jiʋaːn] چھُ یِوان	[t͡ʃʰe jiʋaːn] چھےٚ یِوان
1st person pl.	[t͡ʃʰi jiʋaːn] چھِ یِوان	[t͡ʃʰe jiʋaːn] چھےٚ یِوان
2nd person pl.	[t͡ʃʰiʋ jiʋaːn] چھِو یِوان	[t͡ʃʰaʋ jiʋaːn] چھَو یِوان
3rd person pl.	[t͡ʃʰi jiʋaːn] چھِ یِوان	[t͡ʃʰe jiʋaːn] چھےٚ یِوان

Past tense in Kashmiri is significantly more complex than the other tenses, and is subdivided into three past tense distinctions. The simple (sometimes called proximate) past refers to completed past actions. Remote past refers to actions that lack this in-built perfective aspect. Indefinite past refers to actions performed a long time ago, and is often used in historical narrative or storytelling contexts.

As described above, Kashmiri is a split-ergative language; in all three of these past tense forms, the subjects of transitive verbs are marked in the ergative case and direct objects in the nominative. Intransitive subjects are marked in the nominative. Nominative arguments, whether subjects or objects, dictate gender, number and person marking on the verb.

Verbs of the simple past tense are formed via the addition of a suffix to the verb stem, which usually undergoes certain uniform morphophonemic changes. First and third person verbs of this type do not take suffixes and agree with the nominative object in gender and number, but there are second person verb endings. The entire simple past tense paradigm of transitive verbs is illustrated below using the verb /parun/ ("to read"):

Simple past (transitive)
		Masculine		Feminine	
		singular	plural	singular	plural
1st person		[por] پۆر	[pərʲ] پٔرؠ	[pər] پٔر	[pari] پَرِ
2nd person	Non-honorific	[porut̪ʰ] پۆرُتھ	[pərit̪ʰ] پٔرِتھ	[pərɨt̪ʰ] پٔرٕتھ	[parʲat̪ʰ] پَرؠتھ
2nd person	Honorific	[porʋɨ] پۆروٕ	[pəriʋɨ] پٔرِوٕ	[pərʋɨ] پٔروٕ	[pariʋɨ] پَرِوٕ
3rd person		[por] پۆر	[pərʲ] پٔرؠ	[pər] پٔر	[pari] پَرِ

A group of irregular intransitive verbs (special intransitives), take a different set of endings in addition to the morphophonemic changes that affect most past tense verbs.

Simple past (special intransitive)
	Masculine		Feminine	
	singular	plural	singular	plural
1st person	-[us] اُس	-[ʲ] ؠ	-[as] اَس	-[i] اِ
2nd person	-[kʰ] کھ	-[ʋɨ] وٕ	-[kʰ] کھ	-[ʋɨ] وٕ
3rd person	-Ø	-Ø	-[t͡ʃʰ] چھ	-[i] اِ

Intransitive verbs in the simple past are conjugated the same as intransitives in the indefinite past tense form.

Simple past (intransitive)
	Masculine		Feminine	
	singular	plural	singular	plural
1st person	-[jas] یَس	-[jeːji] یے یہِ	-[jeːjas] یے یَس	-[jeːji] یے یہِ
2nd person	-[jaːkʰ] یاکھ	-[jeːjiʋɨ] یے یِوٕ	-[jeːjakʰ] یے یَکھ	-[jeːjiʋɨ] یے یِوٕ
3rd person	-[joːʋ] یوو	-[jeːji] یے یہِ	-[jeːji] یے یہِ	-[jeːji] یے یہِ

In contrast to the simple past, verb stems are unchanged in the indefinite and remote past, although the addition of the tense suffixes does cause some morphophonetic change. Transitive verbs are declined according to the following paradigm:

Indefinite past (transitive)
	Masculine		Feminine	
	singular	plural	singular	plural
1st/3rd person	-[joːʋ] یوو	-[eːji] ے یہِ	-[eːji] ے یہِ	-[eːji] ے یہِ
2nd person	-[joːt̪ʰ] یوتھ	-[eːjat̪ʰ] ے یَتھ	-[eːjat̪ʰ] ے یَتھ	-[eːjat̪ʰ] ے یَتھ

Remote past (transitive)
	Masculine		Feminine	
	singular	plural	singular	plural
1st/3rd person	-[eːjoːʋ] ے یوو	-[eːjaːji] ے یایہِ	-[eːjaːji] ے یایہِ	-[eːjaːji] ے یایہِ
2nd person	-[eːjoːt̪ʰ] ے یوتھ	-[eːjeːjat̪ʰ] ے یے یَتھ	-[eːjeːjat̪ʰ] ے یے یَتھ	-[eːjeːjat̪ʰ] ے یے یَتھ

As in the simple past, "special intransitive" verbs take a different set of endings in the indefinite and remote past:

Indefinite past (special intransitive)
	Masculine		Feminine	
	singular	plural	singular	plural
1st person	-[aːs] اس	-[aːjas] ایَس	-[aːjas] ایَس	-[aːji] ایہِ
2nd person	-[kʰ] کھ	-[kʰ] کھ	-[aːjakʰ] ایَکھ	-[aːjiʋɨ] ایِوٕ
3rd person	-[aʋ] اَو	-[aːji] ایہِ	-[aːji] ایہِ	-[aːji] ایہِ

Remote past (special intransitive)
	Masculine		Feminine	
	singular	plural	singular	plural
1st person	-[aːjaːs] ایاس	-[eːjaːji] ے یایہِ	-[eːjeːjas] ے یے یَس	-[eːjeːji] ے یے یہِ
2nd person	-[aːkʰ] اکھ	-[eːjiʋɨ] ے یِوٕ	-[aːjakʰ] ایَکھ	-[aːjiʋɨ] ایِوٕ
3rd person	-[eːjoːʋ] ے یوو	-[eːjeːji] ے یے یہِ	-[eːjaːjɨ] ے یایہٕ	-[eːjaːjɨ] ے یایہٕ

Regular intransitive verbs also take a different set of endings in the indefinite and remote past, subject to some morphophonetic variation:

Indefinite past (intransitive)
	Masculine		Feminine	
	singular	plural	singular	plural
1st person	-[jas] یَس	-[jeːji] یے یہِ	-[jeːjas] یے یَس	-[jeːji] یے یہِ
2nd person	-[jaːkʰ] یاکھ	-[jeːjiʋɨ] یے یِوٕ	-[jeːjakʰ] یے یَکھ	-[jeːjiʋɨ] یے یِوٕ
3rd person	-[joːʋ] یوو	-[jeːji] یے یہِ	-[jeːji] یے یہِ	-[jeːji] یے یہِ

Remote past (intransitive)
	Masculine		Feminine	
	singular	plural	singular	plural
1st person	-[jeːjaːs] یے یاس	-[jeːji] یے یہِ	-[jeːjaːs] یے یاس	-[jeːji] یے یہِ
2nd person	-[jeːjakʰ] یے یَکھ	-[jeːjiʋɨ] یے یِوٕ	-[jeːjakʰ] یے یَکھ	-[jeːjiʋɨ] یے یِوٕ
3rd person	-[jeːjoːʋ] یے یوو	-[jeːji] یے یہِ	-[jeːjaːjɨ] یے یایہٕ	-[jeːjɨ] یے یہٕ

Future tense intransitive verbs are formed by the addition of suffixes to the verb stem:

Future (intransitive)
	Singular	Plural
1st person	-[mɨ] مہٕ	-[maʋ] مَو
2nd person	-[akʰ] اَکھ	-[jiʋ] یِو
3rd person	-[ji] یہِ	-[an] اَن

The future tense of transitive verbs, however, is formed by adding suffixes that agree with both the subject and direct object according to number, in a complex fashion:

Future (transitive)
	Singular object	Plural object
1st person sing.	-[an] اَن	-[akʰ] اَکھ
1st person pl.	-[ɨhoːn] إہون	-[ɨhoːkʰ] إہوکھ
2nd person sing.	-[ɨhǝn] إۂن	-[ɨhǝkʰ] إۂکھ
2nd person pl.	-[ɨhuːn] إہوٗن	-[ɨhuːkʰ] إہوٗکھ
3rd person sing.	-[jas] یَس	-[jakʰ] یَکھ
3rd person pl.	-[ɨnas] إنَس	-[ɨnakʰ] إنَکھ

==== Aspect ====
There are two main aspectual distinctions in Kashmiri, perfective and imperfective. Both employ a participle formed by the addition of a suffix to the verb stem, as well as the fully conjugated auxiliary /aːsun/ ("to be")—which agrees according to gender, number and person with the object (for transitive verbs) or the subject (for intransitive verbs).

Like the auxiliary, the participle suffix used with the perfective aspect (expressing completed or concluded action) agrees in gender and number with the object (for transitive verbs) or subject (for intransitives) as illustrated below:

Masculine		Feminine	
singular	plural	singular	plural
-[mut̪] مُت	-[mɨt̪ʲ] مٕتؠ	-[mɨt͡s] مٕژ	-[mat͡sɨ] مَژٕ

The imperfective (expressing habitual or progressive action) is simpler, taking the participle suffix -/aːn/ in all forms, with only the auxiliary showing agreement. A type of iterative aspect can be expressed by reduplicating the imperfective participle.

=== Pronouns ===
Pronouns are declined according to person, gender, number and case, although only third person pronouns are overtly gendered. Also in third person, a distinction is made between three degrees of proximity, called proximate, remote I and remote II.

Nominative
		Masculine		Feminine	
		singular	plural	singular	plural
1st person		[bɨ] بہٕ	[ǝsʲ] أسؠ	[bɨ] بہٕ	[ǝsʲ] أسؠ
2nd person		[t͡sɨ] ژٕ	[t̪ohʲ] or [t̪uhʲ] تۆہؠ or تُہؠ	[t͡sɨ] ژٕ	[t̪ohʲ] or [t̪uhʲ] تۆہؠ or تُہؠ
3rd person	proximate	[ji] یہِ	[jim] یِم	[ji] یہِ	[jimɨ] یِمہٕ
3rd person	remote I	[hu] ہُہ	[hum] ہُم	[hɔ] ہۄ	[humɨ] ہُمہٕ
3rd person	remote II	[su] سُہ	[t̪im] تِم	[sɔ] سۄ	[t̪imɨ] تِمہٕ

Ergative
		Masculine		Feminine	
		singular	plural	singular	plural
1st person		[me] مےٚ	[asi] اَسہِ	[me] مےٚ	[asi] اَسہِ
2nd person		[t͡se] ژےٚ	[t̪ɔhi] تۄہہِ	[t͡se] ژےٚ	[t̪ɔhi] تۄہہِ
3rd person	proximate	[jemʲ] ییٚمؠ	[jimaʋ] یِمَو	[jemi] ییٚمہِ	[jimaʋ] یِمَو
3rd person	remote I	[humʲ] ہُمؠ	[humaʋ] ہُمَو	[humi] ہُمہِ	[humaʋ] ہُمَو
3rd person	remote II	[t̪ǝmʲ] تٔمؠ	[t̪imaʋ] تِمَو	[t̪ami] تَمہِ	[t̪imaʋ] تِمَو

Dative
		Masculine		Feminine	
		singular	plural	singular	plural
1st person		[me] مےٚ	[asi] اَسہِ	[me] مےٚ	[asi] اَسہِ
2nd person		[t͡se] ژےٚ	[t̪ɔhi] تۄہہِ	[t͡se] ژےٚ	[t̪ɔhi] تۄہہِ
3rd person	proximate	[jemis] ییٚمِس	[jiman] یِمَن	[jemis] ییٚمِس	[jiman] یِمَن
3rd person	remote I	[humis] ہُمِس	[human] ہُمَن	[humis] ہُمِس	[human] ہُمَن
3rd person	remote II	[t̪ǝmis] تٔمِس	[t̪iman] تِمَن	[t̪ǝmis] تٔمِس	[t̪iman] تِمَن

Ablative
		Masculine		Feminine	
		singular	plural	singular	plural
1st person		[me] مےٚ	[asi] اَسہِ	[me] مےٚ	[asi] اَسہِ
2nd person		[t͡se] ژےٚ	[t̪ɔhi] تۄہہِ	[t͡se] ژےٚ	[t̪ɔhi] تۄہہِ
3rd person	proximate	[jemi] ییٚمہِ	[jimaʋ] یِمَو	[jemi] ییٚمہِ	[jimaʋ] یِمَو
3rd person	remote I	[humi] ہُمہِ	[humaʋ] ہُمَو	[humi] ہُمہِ	[humaʋ] ہُمَو
3rd person	remote II	[t̪ǝmi] تٔمہِ	[t̪imaʋ] تِمَو	[t̪ǝmi] تٔمہِ	[t̪imaʋ] تِمَو

There is also a dedicated genitive pronoun set, in contrast to the way that the genitive is constructed adverbially elsewhere. As with future tense, these forms agree with both the subject and direct object in person and number.

	Masculine		Feminine	
	singular	plural	singular	plural
1st sing.	[mʲoːn] میٛون	[mʲəːnʲ] میٛٲنؠ	[mʲəːnʲ] میٛٲنؠ	[mʲaːni] میٛانہِ
1st pl.	[soːn] سون	[səːnʲ] سٲنؠ	[səːnʲ] سٲنؠ	[saːni] سانہِ
2nd sing.	[t͡ʃoːn] چون	[t͡ʃəːnʲ] چٲنؠ	[t͡ʃəːnʲ] چٲنؠ	[t͡ʃaːni] چانہِ
2nd pl.	[t̪uhund̪] تُہُنٛد	[t̪uhɨnd̪ʲ] تُہٕنٛدؠ	[t̪uhɨnz] تُہٕنٛز	[t̪uhɨnzɨ] تُہٕنٛزٕ
3rd sing. prox.	[jemʲ sund̪] ییٚمؠ سُنٛد	[jemʲ sɨnd̪ʲ] ییٚمؠ سٕنٛدؠ	[jemʲ sɨnz] ییٚمؠ سٕنٛز	[jemʲ sɨnzɨ] ییٚمؠ سٕنٛزٕ
3rd pl. prox.	[jihund̪] یِہُنٛد	[jihɨnd̪ʲ] یِہٕنٛدؠ	[jihɨnz] یِہٕنٛز	[jihɨnzɨ] یِہٕنٛزٕ
3rd sing. R I	[humʲ sund] ہُمؠ سُنٛد	[humʲ sɨnd̪ʲ] ہُمؠ سٕنٛدؠ	[humʲ sɨnz] ہُمؠ سٕنٛز	[humʲ sɨnzɨ] ہُمؠ سٕنٛزٕ
3rd pl. R I	[huhund̪] ہُہُنٛد	[huhɨnd̪ʲ] ہُہٕنٛدؠ	[huhɨnz] ہُہٕنٛز	[huhɨnzɨ] ہُہٕنٛزٕ
3rd sing. R II	[t̪ǝmʲ sund̪] تٔمؠ سُنٛد	[t̪ǝmʲ sɨnd̪ʲ] تٔمؠ سٕنٛدؠ	[t̪ǝmʲ sɨnz] تٔمؠ سٕنٛز	[t̪ǝmʲ sɨnzɨ] تٔمؠ سٕنٛزٕ
3rd pl. R II	[t̪ihund̪] تِہُنٛد	[t̪ihɨnd̪ʲ] تِہٕنٛدؠ	[t̪ihɨnz] تِہٕنٛز	[t̪ihɨnzɨ] تِہٕنٛزٕ

=== Adjectives ===
There are two kinds of adjectives in Kashmiri, those that agree with their referent noun (according to case, gender and number) and those that are not declined at all. Most adjectives are declined, and generally take the same endings and gender-specific stem changes as nouns. The declinable adjective endings are provided in the table below, using the adjective وۄزُل [ʋɔzul] ("red"):

	Masculine		Feminine	
	singular	plural	singular	plural
Nom.	[ʋɔzul] وۄزُل	[ʋɔzɨlʲ] وۄزٕلؠ	[ʋɔzɨd͡ʒ] وۄزٕج	[ʋɔzd͡ʒi] وۄزجہِ
Erg.	[ʋɔzlɨ] وۄزلہٕ	[ʋɔzlʲaʋ] وۄزلؠو	[ʋɔzd͡ʒi] وۄزجہِ	[ʋɔzd͡ʒaʋ] وۄزجَو
Dat.	[ʋɔzlis] وۄزلِس	[ʋɔzlʲan] وۄزلؠن	[ʋɔzd͡ʒi] وۄزجہِ	[ʋɔzd͡ʒan] وۄزجَن
Abl.	[ʋɔzlɨ] وۄزلہٕ	[ʋɔzlʲaʋ] وۄزلؠو	[ʋɔzd͡ʒi] وۄزجہِ	[ʋɔzd͡ʒaʋ] وۄزجَو

Among those adjectives not declined are adjectives that end in -[lad̪] or -[ɨ], adjectives borrowed from other languages, and a few isolated irregulars.

The comparative and superlative forms of adjectives are formed with the words ژۆر [t͡sor] ("more") and سؠٹھا [sʲaʈʰaː] ("most"), respectively.

=== Numerals ===
Within the Kashmir language, numerals are separated into cardinal numbers and ordinal numbers. These numeral forms, as well as their aggregative (both, all the five, etc.), multiplicative (two times, four times, etc.), and emphatic forms (only one, only three, etc.) are provided by the table below.

	Cardinal	Ordinal	Aggregative	Multiplicative	Emphatic
Suffix		-[jum] for masculine -[im] for feminine	-[ʋaj]	-[ɡun] or -[ɡon] for masculine -[ɡɨn] for feminine	-[j]
0.	[sifar] صِفَر				
1.	[akʰ] اَکھ	[ǝkʲum] or [ǝkim] أکیُٛم or أکِم		[oɡun] or [oɡɨn] اۆگُن or اۆگٕن	[akuj] اَکُے
2.	[zɨ] زٕ	[dojum] or [dojim] دۆیُم or دۆیِم	[dɔʃʋaj] دۄشوَے	[doɡun] or [doɡɨn] دۆگُن or دۆگٕن	[zɨj] زٕے
3.	[tre] ترٛےٚ	[trejum] or [trejim] ترٛیٚیُم or ترٛیٚیِم	[treʃʋaj] ترٛیٚشوَے	[troɡun] or [troɡɨn] ترٛۆگُن or ترٛۆگٕن	[trej] ترٛیٚے
4.	[t͡soːr] ژور	[t͡suːrʲum] or [t͡suːrim] ژوٗریُٛم or ژوٗرِم	[t͡sɔʃʋaj] ژۄشوَے	[t͡soɡun] or [t͡soɡɨn] ژۆگُن or ژۆگٕن	[t͡soːraj] ژورَے
5.	[pãːt͡sʰ] or [pə̃ːt͡sʰ] پانٛژھ or پٲنٛژھ	[pɨ̃:t͡sjum] or [pɨ̃:t͡sim] پٟنٛژیُٛم or پٟنٛژِم	[pãːt͡sɨʋaj] پانٛژٕوَے	[pãːt͡sɨɡun] or [pãːt͡sɨɡɨn] پانٛژٕگُن or پانٛژٕگٕن	[pãːt͡saj] پانٛژَے
6.	[ʃe] شےٚ	[ʃejum] or [ʃejim] شیٚیُم or شیٚیِم	[ʃenɨʋaj] شیٚنہٕ وَے	[ʃuɡun] or [ʃuɡɨn] شُگُن or شُگٕن	[ʃej] شیٚے
7.	[satʰ] سَتھ	[sətjum] or [sətim] سٔتیُٛم or سٔتِم	[satɨʋaj] سَتہٕ وَے	[satɨɡun] or [satɨɡɨn] سَتہٕ گُن or سَتہٕ گٕن	[sataj] سَتَے
8.	[əːʈʰ] ٲٹھ	[ɨːʈʰjum] or [uːʈʰjum] اٟٹھیُٛم or اوٗٹھیُٛم [ɨːʈʰim] or [uːʈʰim] اٟٹھِم or اوٗٹھِم	[əːʈʰɨʋaj] ٲٹھٕ وَے	[əːʈʰɨɡun] or [əːʈʰɨɡɨn] ٲٹھٕ گُن or ٲٹھٕ گٕن	[əːʈʰaj] ٲٹھَے
9.	[naʋ] نَو	[nəʋjum] or [nəʋim] نٔویُٛم or نٔوِم	[naʋɨʋaj] نَوٕوَے	[naʋɨɡun] or [naʋɨɡɨn] نَوٕگُن or نَوٕگٕن	[naʋaj] نَوَے
10.	[dəh] or [daːh] دٔہ or داہ	[dəhjum] or [dəhim] دٔہیُٛم or دٔہِم	[dəhɨʋaj] دٔہہٕ وَے	[dəhɨɡon] or [dəhɨɡɨn] دٔہہٕ گۆن or دٔہہٕ گٕن	[dəhaj] دٔہَے
100.	[hatʰ] ہَتھ	[hatyum] or [hatim] ہَتیُٛم or ہَتِم			
1000.	[saːs] ساس	[səːsjum] or [səːsim] سٲسیُٛم or سٲسِم			
10,000.	[dəh saːs] or [daːh saːs] دٔہ ساس or داہ ساس	[dəh səːsjum] or [daːh səːsjum] دٔہ سٲسیُٛم or داہ سٲسیُٛم [dəh səːsim] or [daːh səːsim] دٔہ سٲسِم or داہ سٲسِم			
Hundred thousand	[lat͡ʃʰ] لَچھ	[lat͡ʃʰjum] or [lat͡ʃʰim] لَچھیُٛم or لَچھِم			
Million	[dəh lat͡ʃʰ] or [daːh lat͡ʃʰ] دٔہ لَچھ or داہ لَچھ	[dəh lat͡ʃʰjum] or [daːh lat͡ʃʰjum] دٔہ لَچھیُٛم or داہ لَچھیُٛم [dəh lat͡ʃʰim] or [daːh lat͡ʃʰim] دٔہ لَچھِم or داہ لَچھِم			
Ten million	[kɔroːr] or [karoːr] کۄرور or کَرور	[kɔroːrjum] or [karoːrjum] کۄروریُٛم or کَروریُٛم [kɔroːrim] or [karoːrim] کۄرورِم or کَرورِم			
Billion	[arab] اَرَب	[arabjum] or [arabim] اَرَبیُٛم or اَرَبِم			
Hundred billion	[kʰarab] کھَرَب	[kʰarabjum] or [kʰarabim] کھَرَبیُٛم or کھَرَبِم			

The ordinal number "1st" which is [ǝkʲum] أکیُٛم for its masculine gender and [ǝkim] أکِم for its feminine gender is also known as [ɡɔɖnʲuk] گۄڈنیُٛک and [ɡɔɖnit͡ʃ] گۄڈنِچ respectively.

== Vocabulary ==
Kashmiri is an Indo-Aryan language and was heavily influenced by Sanskrit, especially early on. After the arrival of Islamic rule in India, Kashmiri acquired many Persian loanwords. In modern times, Kashmiri vocabulary has loan words from English, Hindustani and Punjabi.

=== Preservation of old Indo-Aryan vocabulary ===
Kashmiri retains several features of Old Indo-Aryan that have been lost in other modern Indo-Aryan languages such as Hindi-Urdu, Punjabi and Sindhi. Some vocabulary features that Kashmiri preserves clearly date from the Vedic Sanskrit era and had already been lost even in Classical Sanskrit. This includes the word-form yodvai (meaning if), which is mainly found in Vedic Sanskrit texts. Classical Sanskrit and modern Indo-Aryan use the word yadi instead.

=== First person pronoun ===
Both the Indo-Aryan and Iranian branches of the Indo-Iranian family have demonstrated a strong tendency to eliminate the distinctive first person pronoun ("I") used in the nominative (subject) case. The Indo-European root for this is reconstructed as *eǵHom, which is preserved in Sanskrit as aham and in Avestan Persian as azam. This contrasts with the m- form ("me", "my") that is used for the accusative, genitive, dative, ablative cases. Sanskrit and Avestan both used forms such as ma(-m). However, in languages such as Modern Persian, Baluchi, Hindi and Punjabi, the distinct nominative form has been entirely lost and replaced with m- in words such as ma-n and mai. However, Kashmiri belongs to a relatively small set that preserves the distinction. 'I' is ba/bi/bo in various Kashmiri dialects, distinct from the other me terms. 'Mine' is myon in Kashmiri. Other Indo-Aryan languages that preserve this feature include Dogri (aun vs me-), Gujarati (hu-n vs ma-ri), Konkani (hā̃v vs mhazo), and Braj (hau-M vs mai-M). The Iranian Pashto preserves it too (za vs. maa), as well as Nuristani languages, such as Askunu (âi vs iũ).

=== Variations ===
There are very minor differences between the Kashmiri spoken by Hindus and Muslims. For 'fire', a traditional Hindu uses the word اۆگُن [oɡun] while a Muslim more often uses the Arabic word نار [naːr].

== Sample text ==
=== Perso-Arabic script ===
Art. 1 of the Universal Declaration of Human Rights:

سٲری اِنسان چھِ آزاد زامٕتؠ۔ وؠقار تہٕ حۆقوٗق چھِ ہِوی۔ تِمَن چھُ سوچ سَمٕج عَطا کَرنہٕ آمُت تہٕ تِمَن پَزِ بٲے بَرادٔری ہٕنٛدِس جَذباتَس تَحَت اَکھ أکِس اَکار بَکار یُن ۔

Kashmiri pronunciation: [səːriː insaːn t͡ʃʰi aːzaːd zaːmɨtʲ. ʋʲaqaːr tɨ hoquːq t͡ʃʰi hiʋiː. timan t͡ʃʰu soːt͡ʃ samɨd͡ʒ ataː karnɨ aːmut tɨ timan pazi bəːj baraːdəriː hɨndis d͡ʒazbaːtas tahat akʰ əkis akaːr bakaːr jun]

"All human beings are born free and equal in dignity and rights. They are endowed with reason and conscience and should act towards one another in a spirit of brotherhood."

=== Sharada script ===
Verses by Lalleshwari:

𑆏𑆩𑆶𑆅 𑆃𑆑𑆶𑆪𑇀 𑆃𑆗𑆶𑆫𑇀 𑆥𑆾𑆫𑆶𑆩𑇀 𑆱𑆶𑆅 𑆩𑆳𑆬𑆴 𑆫𑆾𑆛𑆶𑆩𑇀 𑆮𑆶𑆤𑇀𑆢𑆱𑇀 𑆩𑆁𑆘𑇀 𑆱𑆶𑆅 𑆩𑆳𑆬𑆴 𑆑𑆤𑆴 𑆥𑇀𑆪𑆜 𑆓𑆾𑆫𑆶𑆩𑇀 𑆠 𑆖𑆾𑆫𑆶𑆩𑇀 𑆃𑆱𑆱𑇀 𑆱𑆳𑆱𑇀 𑆠 𑆱𑆥𑆤𑇀𑆪𑆱𑇀 𑆱𑆾𑆤𑇀𑇆

Kashmiri pronunciation: [oːmuj akuj at͡ʃʰur porum, suj maːli roʈum ʋɔndas manz, suj maːli kani pʲaʈʰ gorum tɨ t͡sorum, əːsɨs saːs tɨ sapnis sɔn.]

"I kept reciting the unique divine word "Om" and kept it safe in my heart through my resolute dedication and love. I was simply ash and by its divine grace got metamorphosed into gold."

𑆃𑆑𑆶𑆪𑇀 𑆏𑆀𑆑𑆳𑆫𑇀 𑆪𑆶𑆱𑇀 𑆤𑆳𑆨𑆴 𑆣𑆫𑆼 𑆑𑆶𑆩𑇀𑆧𑆼 𑆧𑇀𑆫𑆲𑇀𑆩𑆳𑆟𑇀𑆝𑆱𑇀 𑆱𑆶𑆩𑇀 𑆓𑆫𑆼 𑆃𑆒𑇀 𑆱𑆶𑆪𑇀 𑆩𑆁𑆠𑇀𑆫 𑆖𑇀𑆪𑆠𑆱𑇀 𑆑𑆫𑆼 𑆠𑆱𑇀 𑆱𑆳𑆱𑇀 𑆩𑆁𑆠𑇀𑆫 𑆑𑇀𑆪𑆳𑆲𑇀 𑆑𑆫𑆼𑇆

Kashmiri pronunciation: [akuj omkaːr jus naːbi dareː, kumbeː brahmaːnɖas sum gareː, akʰ suj mantʰɨr t͡sʲatas kareː, tas saːs mantʰɨr kʲaːh kareː.]

"One who recites the divine word "Omkār" by devotion is capable to build a bridge between his own and the cosmic consciousness. By staying committed to this sacred word, one doesn't require any other mantra out of thousands others."

== See also ==
- Kashmir Valley
- Literature of Kashmir
- Kashmiri Wikipedia
- List of Kashmiri poets
- List of topics on the land and the people of “Jammu and Kashmir”
- Shina language
- States of India by Kashmiri speakers
- Zero-width non-joiner

== Bibliography ==
- Chopra, R. M (2013). "Indo-Persian Literature in Kashmir". The rise, growth, and decline of Indo-Persian literature (2nd ed.). New Delhi: Iran Culture House. OCLC 909254259.
- Grierson, George Abraham (1911). "Indo-Aryan Languages" . In Chisholm, Hugh (ed.). Encyclopædia Britannica. Vol. 14 (11th ed.). Cambridge University Press. pp. 487–490.
- Wali, Kashi; Koul, Omkar N. (1997). Kashmiri: A cognitive-descriptive grammar. London and New York: Routledge. ISBN 0-415-05868-6.
- Koul, Omkar N; Wali, Kashi (2006). Modern Kashmiri Grammar (PDF). Springfield: Dunwoody Press. ISBN 1-931546-07-X. Archived from the original (PDF) on 3 March 2016.
- Wade, TR (1888). A Grammar of the Kashmiri Language. SPCK.
