= States of India by Urdu speakers =

As per Government of India census data of 2011, the total number of Urdu speakers in the Republic of India were 62,772,631. According to the census guidelines, "Urdu" does not broadly refer to the Hindustani language, but the literary-register of the macrolanguage, hence accounting Hindi as a separate language.

Urdu is officially recognised in India and has official status in the National Capital Territory of Delhi to which the language has remained deeply attached through its medieval history of Muslim sultanates and empires and the Indian states and union territories of Uttar Pradesh, Bihar, Telangana and Jammu and Kashmir.

== Regional distribution ==
Following is a list of States and Union Territories of India by speakers of Urdu census data with estimated 2001 speakers.

Administrative divisions	Urdu speakers		
Administrative divisions	Total	Male	Female
States
Uttar Pradesh	38,272,080	20,947,596	19,324,484
Bihar	17,757,548	8,891,011	8,566,537
Maharashtra	6,895,501	3,247,547	3,247,954
Telangana & Andhra Pradesh (Note: Telangana state was created after 2011 census, hence separate numbers are not available.)	5,539,910	3,430,719	2,109,191
Jharkhand	3,324,411	2,206,458	1,117,953
Madhya Pradesh	3,186,364	2,180,019	1,006,345
Karnataka	2,674,333	1,373,117	1,301,216
West Bengal	1,653,739	914,087	739,652
Rajasthan	1,462,983	781,000	681,002
Gujarat	1,350,630	687,723	663,907
Odisha	899,299	411,692	288,817
Tamil Nadu	511,299	273,914	232,385
Uttarakhand	497,081	265,152	231,929
Haryana	260,687	140,038	120,649
Chhattisgarh	88,008	46,670	41,338
Goa	54,163	28,306	25,857
Punjab	27,660	16,971	10,689
Kerala	51,492	26,703	25,789
Himachal Pradesh	4,787	3,146	1,641
Assam	4,715	2,821	1,894
Sikkim	2,930	2,118	812
Meghalaya	2,531	1,509	1,022
Arunachal Pradesh	1,258	883	375
Manipur	483	470	13
Tripura	313	253	60
Mizoram	98	84	14
Nagaland	759	562	197
Union territories
Delhi	8,575,033	4,351,545	4,223,488
Jammu & Kashmir	13,251	8,293	4,958
Chandigarh	7,254	4,428	2,826
Puducherry	7,092	3,450	3,642
Andaman & Nicobar Islands	1,615	885	730
Dadra & Nagar Haveli	994	590	404
Daman & Diu	574	388	186
Lakshadweep	26	14	12
India	85,061,078	46,837,143	45,698,968

For census data of 1991:GOI census 1991: DISTRIBUTION OF 10,000 PERSONS BY LANGUAGE - INDIA, STATES AND UNION TERRITORIES - 1991

== Speaker strength ==
Following is speaker's strength data of Urdu language for decades of 1971, 1981, 1991 & 2001:

Language	Persons who returned the language as their mother tongue					Percentage to total population				
Language	1971	1981	1991	2001	2011	1971	1981	1991	2001	2011
Urdu	28,620,895	34,941,435	43,406,932	51,536,111	50,772,631	5.22	5.25	5.18	5.01	4.19

== Ranking ==
Following is ranking data of Urdu language for decades of 1971, 1981, 1991 & 2001:

Urdu: its rank and percentage to total population
1971		1981		1991		2001		2011	
Rank	%	Rank	%	Rank	%	Rank	%	Rank	%
6	5.22	5	5.25	6	5.18**	6	5.01	7	4.19

"**" Census was not conducted in the former state of Jammu and Kashmir

== See also ==
- States of India by urban population
- States of India by size of economy
- Muslims of Uttar Pradesh
