= States of India by Telugu speakers =

This is a list of states and union territories of India by speakers of Telugu as of census 2011.

| Rank | State | Telugu speakers (2001) | Telugu speakers (2011) | Percentage (2011) |
| — | India | 74,002,856 | 81,125,493 | — |
| 1 | Andhra Pradesh / Telangana | 61,924,954 | 74,665,533 | 83.55% |
| 2 | Karnataka | 3,718,180 | 3,569,400 | 5.91% |
| 3 | Tamil Nadu | 3,525,921 | 4,234,302 | 5.87% |
| 4 | Maharashtra | 1,304,740 | 1,320,880 | 1.18% |
| 5 | Chhattisgarh | 1,147,920 | 1,152,100 | 3.60% |
| 6 | Orissa | 1,214,010 | 1,667,693 | 3.51% |
| 7 | West Bengal | 108,458 | 188,352 | 0.10% |
| 8 | Gujarat | 170,939 | 173,568 | 0.12% |
| 9 | Puducherry | 50,958 | 74,347 | 5.96% |
| 10 | Kerala | 147,762 | 135,380 | 0.53% |
| 11 | Andaman and Nicobar Islands | 46,050 | 50,404 | 13.24% |
| 12 | Jharkhand | 35,030 | 30,704 | 0.09% |
| 13 | Delhi | 27,701 | 25,934 | 0.15% |
| 14 | Assam | 26,656 | 26,630 | 0.09% |
| 15 | Madhya Pradesh | 24,139 | 24,411 | 0.03% |
| 16 | Goa | 11,994 | 11,116 | 0.76% |
| 17 | Rajasthan | 11,301 | 8,350 | 0.01% |
| 18 | Punjab | 7,308 | 9,523 | 0.03% |
| 19 | Jammu and Kashmir | 7,101 | 13,970 | 0.11% |
| 20 | Haryana | 6,343 | 9,831 | 0.04% |
| 21 | Tripura | 3,839 | 3,845 | 0.10% |
| 22 | Uttarakhand | 2,000 | 3,185 | 0.03% |
| 23 | Arunachal Pradesh | 1,647 | 1,653 | 0.12% |
| 24 | Nagaland | 1,393 | 1,188 | 0.06% |
| 25 | Chandigarh | 1,351 | 1,339 | 0.13% |
| 26 | Himachal Pradesh | 1,216 | 1,383 | 0.02% |
| 27 | Manipur | 650 | 1,098 | 0.04% |
| 28 | Dadra and Nagar Haveli | 617 | 778 | 0.23% |
| 29 | Meghalaya | 464 | 1,277 | 0.04% |
| 30 | Sikkim | 325 | 1,035 | 0.17% |
| 31 | Daman and Diu | 301 | 464 | 0.19% |
| 32 | Mizoram | 267 | 334 | 0.03% |
| 33 | Bihar | - | 1,467 | - |
| 34 | Uttar Pradesh | - | 13,977 | - |

== See also ==
- States of India by urban population
- States of India by size of economy
