= States of India by Sindhi speakers =

This is a list of States and Union Territories of India by speakers of Sindhi as of census 2001. Gross population figures are available online.

Rank	State	Sindhi speakers
—	India	35,53,570
1	Maharashtra	724,000
2	Gujarat	707,214
3	Rajasthan	378,598
4	Madhya Pradesh	259,496
5	Chhattisgarh	89,585
6	Delhi	42,937
7	Uttar Pradesh	33,240
8	Tamil Nadu	32,855
9	West Bengal	8,018
10	Andhra Pradesh	7,621
11	Haryana	6,343
12	Karnataka	6,855
13	Uttarakhand	5,094
14	Orissa	3,680
15	Jharkhand	2,695
16	Goa	539
17	Meghalaya	232
18	Daman and Diu	221
19	Dadra and Nagar Haveli	132
20	Arunachal Pradesh	110
21	Puducherry	97
22	Chandigarh	90

== See also ==
- States of India by urban population
- States of India by size of economy
