= List of states and union territories of India by Punjabi speakers =

This is a list of states and union territories of India by Punjabi speakers as of the 2011 census. (Note: This list is of those people who declare Punjabi to be their mother tongue in the census of India. It does not list the states and union territories of India by number of ethnic Punjabis.) (Note: Includes speakers of Bagri, Bhateali, Kahluri and other such dialects or related languages.)

== List ==
Rank	State or Union territory	Speakers in 2011 (% of population) (2011)	Speakers in 2001 (% of population) (2001)	% of population (1991)	% of population (1981)	% of population (1971)	% of population (1961)
—	India	33,124,726 (2.74%)	29,102,477 (2.83%)	2.79%	2.95%	2.57%	2.49%
1	Punjab	24,917,885 (89.82%)	22,334,369 (91.69%)	92.2%	84.88%	79.49%	65.6%
2	Haryana	2,400,883 (9.47%)	2,234,626 (10.57%)	7.10%	5.70%	8.34%	–
3	Rajasthan	2,274,342 (3.32%)	1,141,200 (2.01%)				
4	Delhi	873,774 (5.20%)	988,980 (7.14%)	7.90%	13.00%	13.04%	13.30%
5	Himachal Pradesh	615,022 (8.96%)	364,175 (5.99%)	6.28%	5.70%	4.75%	
6	Uttar Pradesh	508,736 (0.25%)	523,094 (0.31%)	0.50% (Note: Figures before 2001 include Uttarakhand)	0.4%	0.57%	
7	Maharashtra	280,192 (0.25%)	269,309				
8	Uttarakhand	263,310 (2.61%)	247,084 (2.91%)	–	–	–	–
9	Chandigarh	232,516 (22.03%)	251,224 (27.89%)	34.70%	40.20%	40.67%	–
10	Jammu and Kashmir	219,193 (75%)	190,675 (74%)		72%		70%
11	Madhya Pradesh	139,658 (0.19%)	148,999				
12	Jharkhand	78,712 (0.24%)	86,596				
13	Chhattisgarh	65,425 (0.26%)	67,293				
14	Gujarat	63,288 (0.10%)	55,810				
15	West Bengal	61,080 (0.07%)	67,952 (0.08%)	0.24%	0.21%		
16	Karnataka	25,981 (0.04%)	15,572				
17	Andhra Pradesh	24,413 (0.03%)	23,838				
18	Assam	23,313 (0.07%)	30,763				
19	Odisha	19,470 (0.05%)	21,574				
20	Bihar	10,467 (0.01%)	13,600				
21	Tamil Nadu	6,565 (0.01%)	5,696				
22	Meghalaya	4,540 (0.15%)	4,753				
23	Arunachal Pradesh	3,674 (0.27%)	2,980				
24	Goa	1,959 (0.13%)	1,815				
25	Andaman and Nicobar Islands	1,565 (0.41%)	1,825				
26	Kerala	1380	1,668				
27	Manipur	1,370 (0.05%)	1,438				
28	Sikkim	1,364 (0.32%)					
29	Nagaland	1,362 (0.11%)					
30	Tripura	997 (0.03%)	1,637				
31	Mizoram	349 (0.03%)	479				
32	Dadra and Nagar Haveli	414 (0.12%)	283				
33	Daman and Diu	222 (0.09%)	304				
34	Puducherry	122 (0.01%)	131				
35	Lakshadweep	4	9				

== See also ==
- States of India by urban population
- States of India by size of economy
