= States of India by Kannada speakers =

This is a list of States and Union Territories of India by speakers of Kannada as of census 2001. Gross population figures are available online.

Rank	State/Union Territory	Kannada speakers
Total	India	50,753,676
1	Karnataka	43,315,781
2	Tamil Nadu	2,596,534
3	Maharashtra	675,432
4	Andhra Pradesh	456,789
5	Goa	362,789
6	Kerala	78,0679
7	Delhi	8976
8	Pondicherry	1682
9	Dadra and Nagar Haveli	33
10	Daman and Diu	25
11	Andaman Islands and Nicobar Islands	9
12	Lakshadweep	7
13	Chandigarh	5
14	Arunachal Pradesh	5
15	Jammu and Kashmir	4
16	Sikkim	3
17	Punjab	2
