= Tirahi language =

Moribund Indo-Aryan language of Afghanistan

Tirahi
- Tirāhī, Dardu
- Native to: Afghanistan
- Region: Nangarhar
- Ethnicity: perhaps 5,000 Tirahi (no date)
- Extinct: by 2025
- Language family: Indo-European: Indo-Iranian; Indo-Aryan; Himachali–Kashmiri–Eastern Dardic?; Eastern Dardic?; Kohistani; Tirahi

Language codes
- ISO 639-3: tra
- Glottolog: tira1253
- ELP: Tirahi
- Tirahi is classified as Critically Endangered by the UNESCO Atlas of the World's Languages in Danger

Tirahi is a nearly extinct if not already extinct Indo-Aryan language spoken in a few villages in the southeast of Jalalabad in the Nangarhar Province of eastern Afghanistan. It is spoken by older adults, who are likewise fluent in Pashto.

The Tirahis were expelled from Tirah in the present-day Khyber District of Khyber Pakhtunkhwa, Pakistan, by the Afridi Pashtuns. Georg Morgenstierne claimed that Tirahi is "probably the remnant of a dialect group extending from Tirah through the Peshawar district into Swat and Dir."

== Geographic distribution ==
Spoken in the Nangarhar Province of Northeastern Afghanistan, there are about 100 native speakers today, if any. This is mainly due to the majority of the Tirahi people having assimilated into the dominant Pashtun culture. Tirahi is also spoken in a couple of villages southeast of the Afghan city of Jalalabad, such as Jaba, Mitarani, and Bara-khel.

== Classification ==
Tirahi is an Indo-Aryan language. Further, Tirahi is part of the sub-group of Kohistani languages along with languages such as Bateri, Chilisso, Gowro, and others. However, Tirahi also shares common traits with languages spoken further to the east, such as Kashmiri. As a Dardic Language, Tirahi strongly preserves some vocabulary of spoken Sanskrit (cow - dēn in Tirahi, dhēnuh in Sanskrit, hand - ast in Tirahi, hastah in Sanskrit). Being a language spoken in Afghanistan, Tirahi shares various words and grammatical constructs with Pashto, a language spoken throughout Afghanistan to which many Tirahi speakers have become accustomed to speaking. Since Tirahi is entirely separated from the other Dardic languages, located south of the Kabul River and west of the Khyber Pass, rendering it wholly encased by Pashto. Tirahi also shares some vocabulary with Kashmiri and Shina such as the Tirahi mala, for a father, the Kashmiri mol, and the Shina malo.

== Grammar ==
Tirahi shows much influence from Pashto in phonology, lexicon and even morphology. However, its vocabulary exhibits a connection to Kohistani dialects. Therefore, Tirahi seems to occupy an intermediate position between Pashto and the Kohistani group. Morgenstirne claims that Tirahi is "probably the remnant of a dialect group extending from Tirah through the Peshawar district into Swat and Dir."

=== Nouns and adjectives ===
Tirahi is an inflected language, having 5 cases: Nominative, Oblique, Genitive, Dative, and Ablative. Adjectives, verbs, and nouns usually agree according to gender. Consonant-final nouns add e or an along with their traditional endings. There appears to be an indefinite article, added to the end of the word as an -ī, similar to Farsi.

	Singular	Plural	Singular	Plural
Nominative	mala - 'father'	mala	adam - 'man'	adam-a
Oblique	mala	mal-an	adam-a	adam-an
Dative	mala-s	mala	adam-a-s	adam-an
Ablative	mala-si	mala-si	adam-a-si	adam-an
Genitive	mala-ma	mala-si	adam-a-ma	adam-an-si

==== Pronouns ====
1st person pronouns:

	Singular	Plural
Nominative	au, ao	mā, ao
Oblique	mē	mēn
Dative	ma-si	ma-si
Genitive	myāna (m), myāni (s), myāna (p?)	N/A

2nd person pronouns:

	Singular	Plural
Nominative	tu, to	tao
Oblique	tē	tā
Dative	ta-si	N/A
Genitive	cā-na (m), cā-nī (m), cā-nī (f), cā-na (mfp)	tāma, tema

==== Verbs ====
1. Non finite forms
  1. Infinitive: stem + an (karan - 'to do/make')
2. Tense-aspect forms
  1. Imperative Singular: stem, Imperative Plural: stem + V
  2. Present-future: root + endings - 1st: - m, 2nd: -s, 3rd: -e, 1st plural: -en
  3. Definite Present: da/de + present-future

==== Example sentences ====
- Abo-e kata dur thi? ('Village' + 'how much far' + 'is')
  - "How far is your village?"
- Pali de kham ('Bread' + Definite Future + 'Eat')
  - "I am eating bread."
- La brok odasta ga ('He' + 'Very' + 'Hungry' + 'become/go')
  - "He became very hungry"
- Ao mara ga-m ('I' + 'die' + 'become')
  - "I died/am dead"
