= Kohistani people =

Kohistani people are diverse Northwestern Indo-Aryan people who natively speak Kohistani languages, and are indigenous to the Kohistan region in northern Pakistan. Their total population is estimated to be between 1 and 2 million. (Note: According to the 2023 Census of Pakistan, the number of Kohistani speakers is 1,039,007, primarily in the northern part of Khyber Pakhtunkhwa. However, an additional 338,793 in the greater Kohistan region (in Malakand and Hazara Divisions) chose "Other", mainly Torwali and Kalami, as well other undocumented Kohistani languages.)

"Kohistani", an umbrella term for the speakers of Indo-Aryan languages from the Kohistan region, includes Hazara Kohistanis, Torwalis, Gawris and several others. They are closely related to the other eastern Dardic peoples (Shina and Kashmiris) and Chitralis. A number of former Kohistani speakers, including Shilmanis, Tirahis and Swatis, can no longer speak their original languages and have instead switched to Pashto, a process known as Pashtunization.

== Sources ==
- Powell, Robert (2016). Himalayan Drawings. Routledge. ISBN 978-1-317-70910-7.
- Frembgen, Jürgen Wasim (1999). "Indus Kohistan: An Historical and Ethnographie Outline". Central Asiatic Journal. 43 (1). Harrassowitz Verlag: 70–98. ISSN 0008-9192.
- Rensch, Calvin Ross; Decker, Sandra J.; Hallberg, Daniel G. (1992). "Volume I: Languages of Kohistan". In Clare F. O’Leary (ed.). Sociolinguistic Survey of Northern Pakistan. National Institute of Pakistan Studies, Quaid-i-Azam University. ISBN 969-8023-11-9.
