= Indus Kohistani language =

Indo-Aryan language spoken in Khyber Pakhtunkhwa, Pakistan

Indus Kohistani
- Kostaie
- کوستَیں; Kōstaiñ
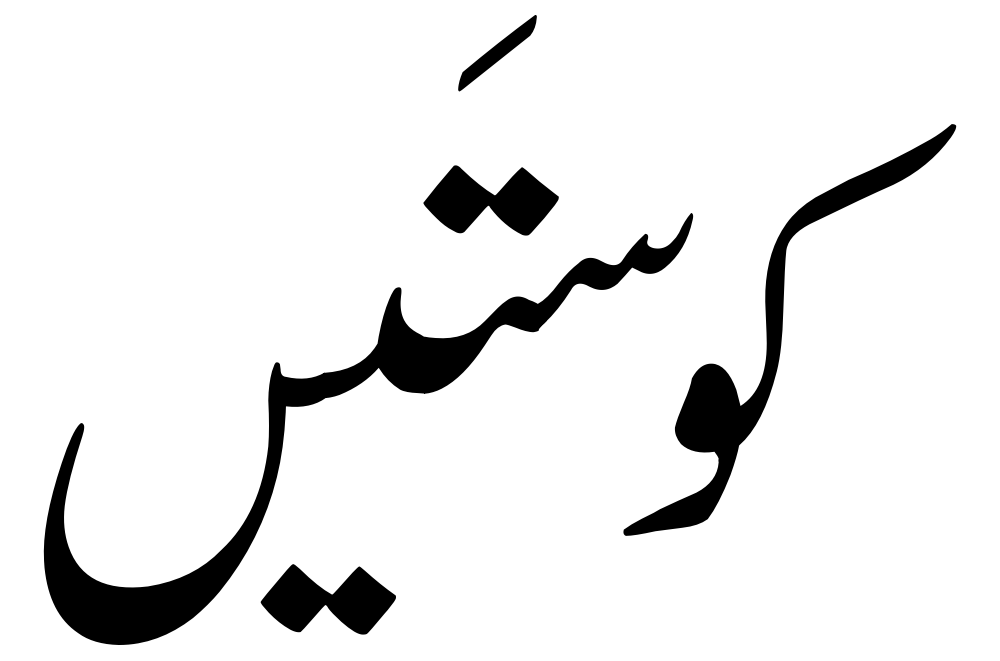
- Region: Indus Kohistan (Upper Kohistan, Lower Kohistan, Kolai-Palas districts as well as Tangir and Darel valleys)
- Ethnicity: Indus Kohistanis
- Native speakers: (200,000 cited 1992)
- Language family: Indo-European: Indo-Iranian; Indo-Aryan; Eastern Dardic; Kohistani; Indus Kohistani
- Writing system: Perso-Arabic script (Nastaliq)

Language codes
- ISO 639-3: mvy
- Glottolog: indu1241
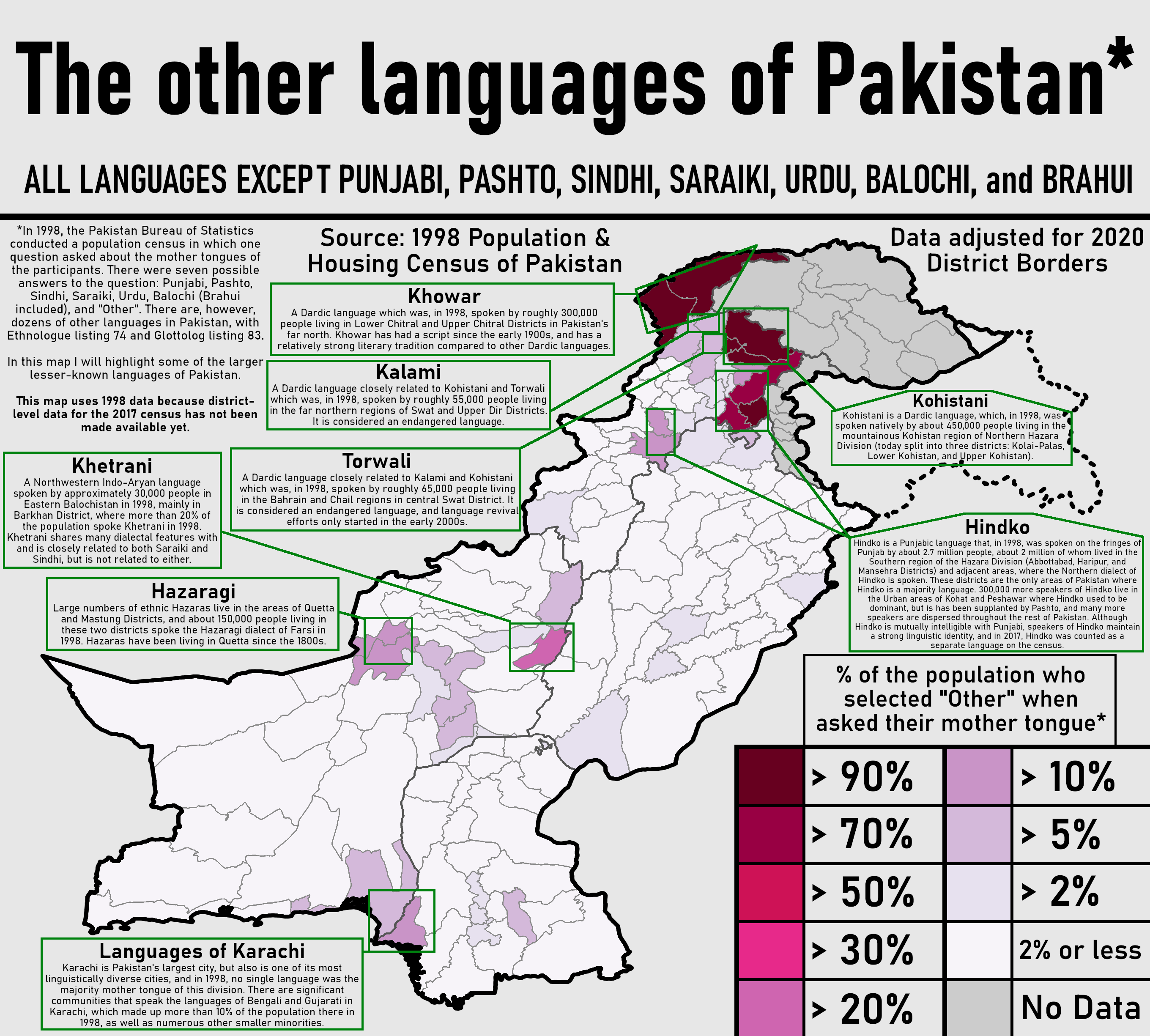
- Kohistani is a minor language of Pakistan which is mainly spoken in the Kohistan region, it is given a space in this map.

Indus Kohistani or simply Kohistani (کوستَیں ژیب, Kōstaiñ) is a Dardic Indo-Aryan language of Kohistani group spoken by the Indus Kohistani people in the former Kohistan District of Pakistan. The language was referred to as Maiyã (Mayon) or Shuthun by early researchers, but subsequent observations have not verified that these names are known locally.

== Geographic distribution ==
Indus Kohistani is spoken on the west bank of the Indus River, down from but not including Dasu until Ranolia along the Indus valley. The major Indus Kohistani speaking settlements include Pattan, Ranolia, Jijal, Duber, Kandia, Seo, Komila and Bankad. A closely related dialect or language variety called Bateri is also spoken in Kolai-Palas Kohistan, on the east bank of Indus.

== Phonology ==
The phonology of Indus Kohistani varies between its major dialects as shown below.

=== Vowels ===
	Front	Central	Back
Close	i iː		u uː
Mid	e eː		o oː
Open		a aː	

In the Kanyawali dialect, the back vowels /u/ and /o/ are described as variants of each other, as are the front vowels /i/ and /e/.

=== Consonants ===
Kohistani is spoken in multiple districts of KPK in north as of the 2017 Pakistan Census

The consonant inventory of Indus Kohistani is shown in the chart below. (Consonants particular to the Kanyawali Dialect of Tangir and those found only in the Kohistan Dialects are color-coded respectively.)

		Labial	Coronal	Retroflex	Palatal	Velar	Uvular	Glottal
Nasal	Voiced	m	n	ɳ				
Nasal	Breathy Voiced	(mʱ)						
Stop	Voiceless	p	t	ʈ		k	(q)	
Stop	Aspirated	pʰ	tʰ	ʈʰ		kʰ		
Stop	Voiced	b	d	ɖ		ɡ		
Stop	Breathy Voiced	bʱ	dʱ	ɖʱ		ɡʱ		
Affricate	Voiceless		ts	tʂ	tʃ			
Affricate	Aspirated		tsʰ		tʃʰ			
Affricate	Voiced				dʒ			
Fricative	Voiceless	f	s	ʂ	ʃ	x		h
Fricative	Voiced	v	z	ʐ	ʒ	ɣ		
Lateral			l					
Rhotic	Voiced		r	ɽ				
Rhotic	Breathy Voiced		rʱ	ɽʱ				
Semivowel					j	w		

The phonemes /x/, /ɣ/, and /q/ are mainly found in loan words. The status of /q/ in the Kanyawali Dialect is unclear. The sounds /f, v/ can also be bilabial [ɸ, β].

== Literature ==
Until recently Indus Kohistani did not have a written tradition. The Forum for Indus Kohistani Research & Culture Development (FIKR&CD) is a Non-Governmental Organization working for standardisation of its script and literature of Indus Kohistani. Shaari (ݜاری) is the first digital journal of Indus Kohistani. Other notable works include "اباسین کوہستئیں ژِبہ مہ علم بلاغت آں علم بیان" (The art of rhetoric and elocution in the Indus Kohistani language), written by Dr. Hussain Ahmad Faizy and Rasheed Ahmad Faizy and published by the Forum for Language Initiatives (FLI).

== See also ==
- Kohistani Shina
- Hazarewal
- Gawri language

== Bibliography ==
- Edelman, D. I. (1983). The Dardic and Nuristani Languages. Moscow: (Institut vostokovedenii︠a︡ (Akademii︠a︡ nauk SSSR).
- Zoller, Claus Peter (2005). A grammar and dictionary of Indus Kohistani. Vol. 1: Dictionary. Berlin: Mouton de Gruyter. ISBN 978-3-11-017947-7.
