= Hazarewal =

Inhabitants of the Hazara region in northern Pakistan

Hazarewal or Hazarawals (ہزارہ وال; Hazarewal pronunciation: [(h)əzaːɾeːʋaːl]; Standard pronunciation: [həzaːɾeːʋaːl]) refer to the multi-ethnic inhabitants of the Hazara region in northern Pakistan. This region is known for its multi-ethnic population, comprising various ethnic groups with diverse origins.

== Hazarewal tribes ==
A number of tribes and communities inhabit the Hazara region, including:

The majority of the inhabitants belong to the Awan, Dhund, Gujar, Gakhar, Karlal, Mashwani, Sayyid, Swati, Tanoli, Durrani, Dilazak, Jadoon, Khattak, Tareen and Yousafzai, the latter of whom migrated to the area after 16th century, as well as Yashkun, Mankiyali, Shinkari, Rajkoti, Chili, and others.

The Swatis are a prominent tribe of Hazara known by their clan divisions, being the Gabri, Mamyali and Matravi with further subdivisions. The tribal distribution was as follows in 1967: in Mansehra Tehsil Swati, Sayyid, Gujar and Tanoli formed majority. Dhund, Karlal, Jadoon, Tareen and Awan populated Abbottabad Tehsil while Haripur Tehsil was mainly populated by Gakhar, Gujjar, Tarkheli, Tanoli, and other communities.

== Languages and culture ==
Hindko is the most spoken language of Hazara Division followed by Kohistani, Shina and various Dardic languages and Pashto. Hindko speaking Hazarewals reside in and form the majority in the Haripur, Abbottabad, and Mansehra districts. The Hindko speaking population consists of the Sayyid, Awan, Gujar, Tanoli, Swati, Dhund, and Jadoon. Pashto speaking Hazarewals include the Yusufzais of the Tor Ghar and the Swatis of Batagram District. The Kohistani people such as the Mankiyali and Yashkun inhabiting the northernmost districts of Hazara speak various Kohistani languages.

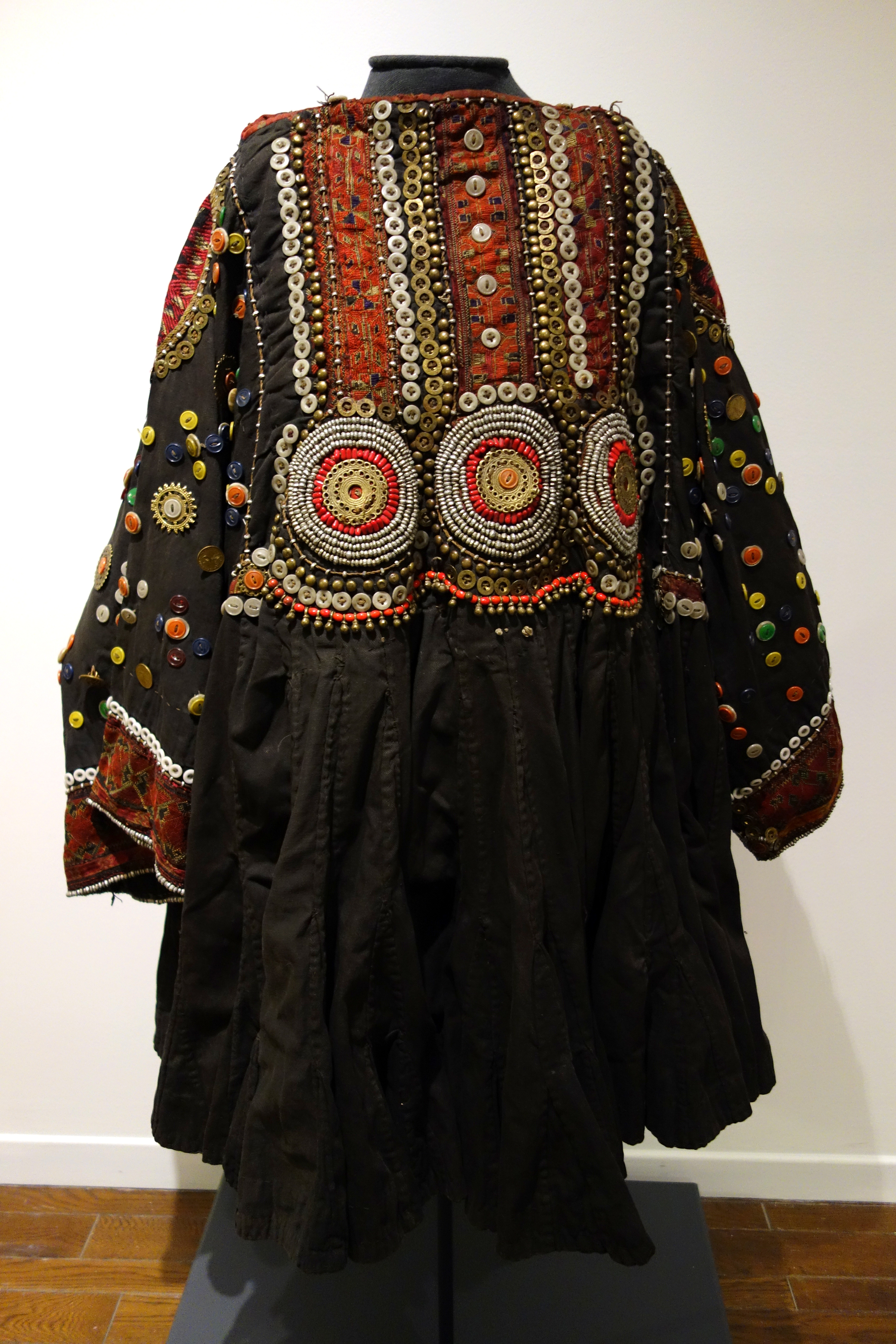
Jumlo/Peyraan dress worn by the Hazarewal community

Other minority languages include Pahari-Pothwari, spoken by sections of the Karlal and Abbasi tribes of the Galyat region of Abbottabad District (where the language is locally called Dhundi-Kairali) and Gojari spoken by Gujjars of the Kaghan Valley. The Hazarewals have, over the last few years, found themselves increasingly in favour of separation and autonomy from the rest of Khyber Pakhtunkhwa province on administrative basis.

== See also ==
- Hindkowans
