= Tirahi =

Ethnic group in Pakistan

Tirahi (Pashto: تيراهي) are an Indo-Aryan people who are native and original inhabitants of Tirah valley. They are closely related to their Dardic neighbours and speak Tirahi language, a nearly extinct if not already extinct Indo-Aryan language which may still be spoken by older adults, who are likewise fluent in Pashto, in a few villages in the southeast of Jalalabad in Nangarhar Province, Afghanistan. They were the previous inhabitants of Tirah and the Peshawar Valley in modern-day Khyber Pakhtunkhwa, Pakistan.

The Tirahis were expelled from Tirah by the Afridi Pashtuns. Georg Morgenstierne claimed that Tirahi language is "probably the remnant of a dialect group extending from Tirah through the Peshawar district into Swat and Dir."

== See also ==
- Orakzai
- Pashtun tribes
