= Lower Kohistan District =

Lower Kohistan District ضلع کوہستان زیریں
- District of Khyber Pakhtunkhwa
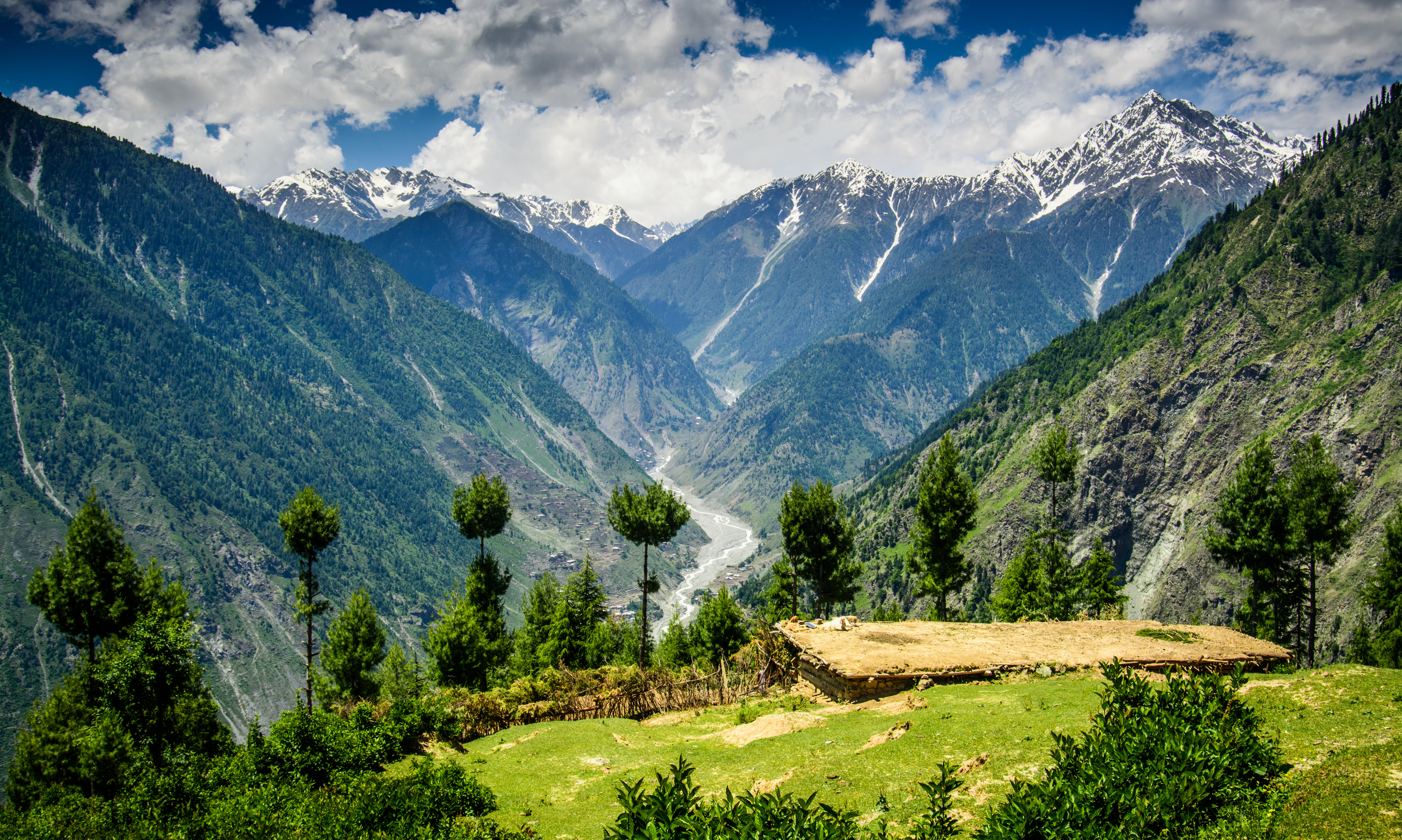
- View of Dubair Valley

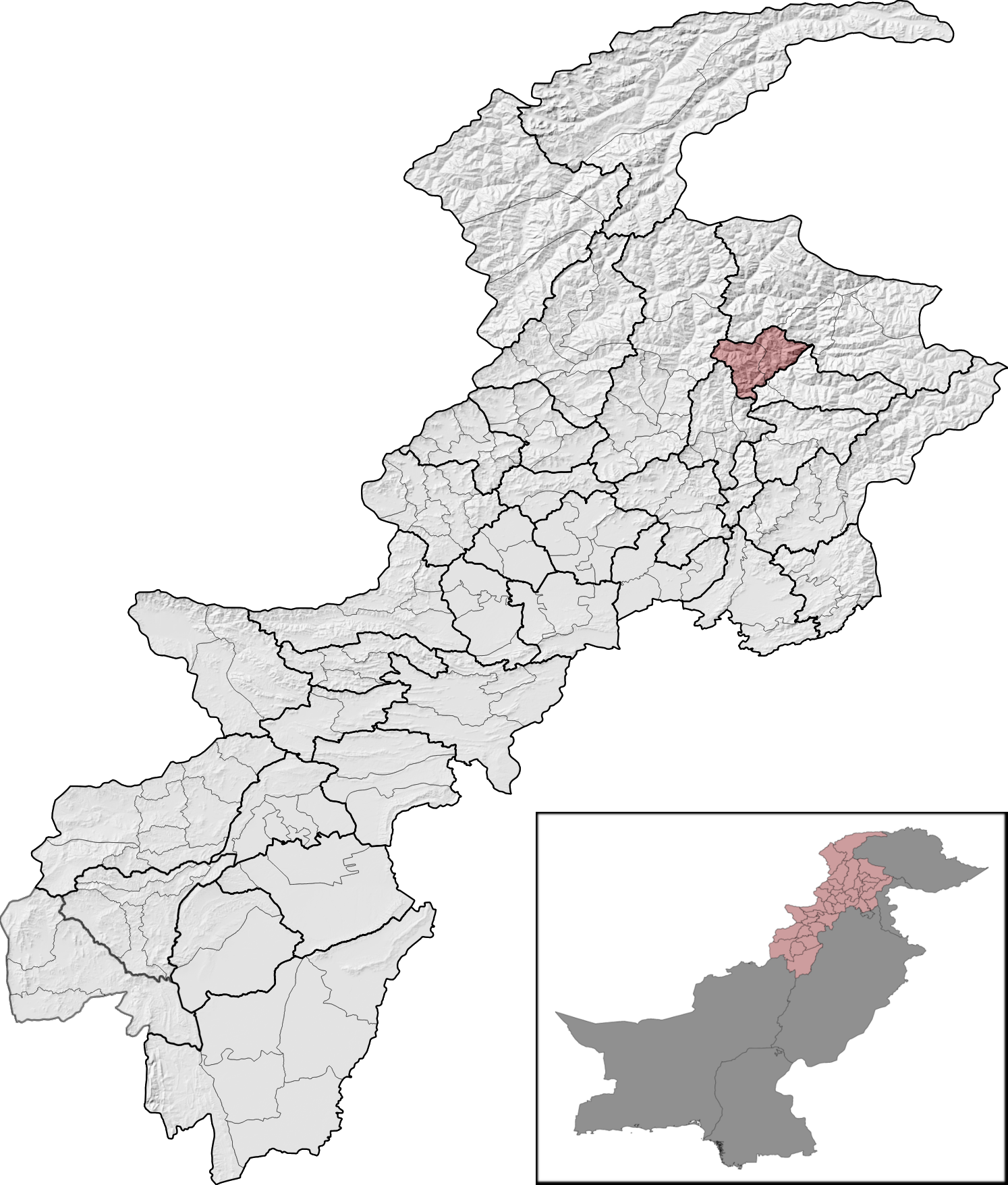
- Lower Kohistan District (red) in Khyber Pakhtunkhwa
- Country: Pakistan
- Province: Khyber Pakhtunkhwa
- Division: Hazara
- Established: 2014
- Headquarters: Pattan

Government
  - Type: District Administration
  - Deputy Commissioner: N/A
  - District Police Officer: N/A
  - District Health Officer: N/A

Area
  - District of Khyber Pakhtunkhwa: 642 km^{2} (248 sq mi)

Population (2023)
  - District of Khyber Pakhtunkhwa: 340,017
  - Density: 530/km^{2} (1,370/sq mi)
  - Urban: 0
  - Rural: 340,017

Literacy
  - Literacy rate: Total: (22.05%); Male: (33.32%); Female: (10.32%)
- Time zone: UTC+5 (PST)
- Number of Tehsils: 2
- languages: Kohistani, Hindko & Urdu
- Website: lowerkohistan.kp.gov.pk

Lower Kohistan District (Urdu: ضلع کوہستان زیریں) is a district in the Hazara Division of the Khyber Pakhtunkhwa province, Pakistan. Pattan is the district headquarters of Lower Kohistan.

== History ==
Until 2014, this district was part of the larger Kohistan District. In 2014, the provincial government of Khyber Pakhtunkhwa bifurcated Kohistan District into the Upper Kohistan and Lower Kohistan districts. At that time, Lower Kohistan comprised two tehsils: Palas and Pattan. However, the tehsil of Palas was separated from the district of Lower Kohistan as another district. It was named as Kolai-Palas. On 31 May 2018, Ranovali Pinkhad, previously part of Pattan tehsil, was made a separate tehsil.

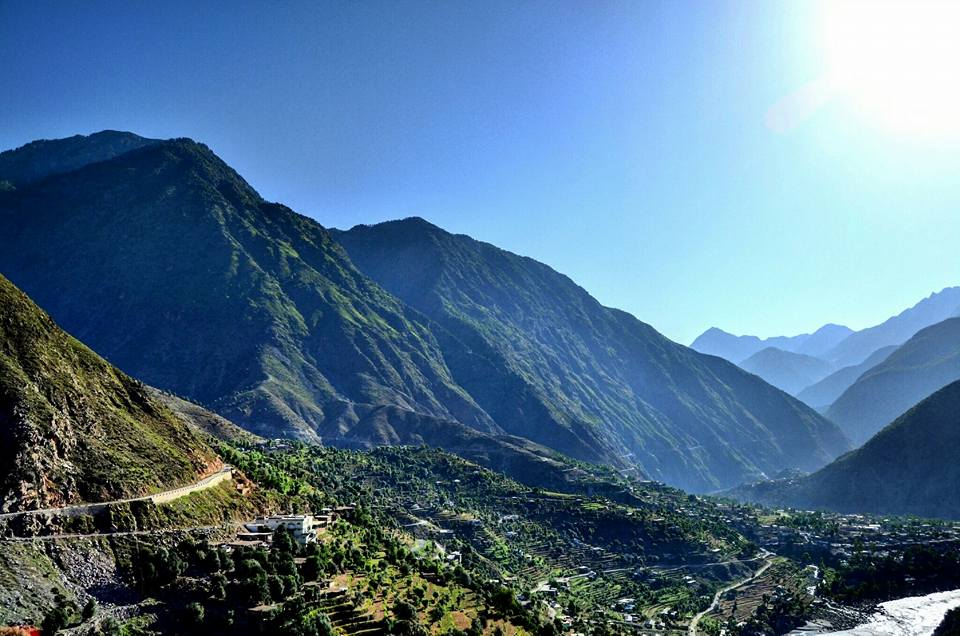
Pattan in lower Kohistan

== Demographics ==
=== Population ===
Historical population
Year	Pop.	±% p.a.
1951	...	—
1961	...	—
1972	...	—
1981	161,428	—
1998	122,211	−1.62%
2017	202,502	+2.69%
2023	340,017	+9.02%

As of the 2023 census, Lower Kohistan district has 47,347 households and a population of 340,017. The district has a sex ratio of 104.39 males to 100 females and a literacy rate of 22.05%: 33.32% for males and 10.32% for females. 135,723 (44.75% of the surveyed population) are under 10 years of age. The entire population lives in rural areas.

=== Social groups ===
Kohistani people form majority in the district.

=== Language ===
Languages of Lower Kohistan district (2023)
1. Kohistani (92.3%)
2. Pashto (5.67%)
3. Others (2.07%)

92.26% of the surveyed population speak one of the many Kohistani languages as their first language. 5.67% are Pashto speakers.

=== Religion ===
According to 2023 census of Pakistan, 945 (0.31% of the surveyed population) people in the district are from religious minorities, mainly Christians.

== Administrative Units ==
Lower Kohistan comprises two Tehsils:

Tehsil	Name (Urdu)	Area (km^{2})	Pop. (2023)	Density (ppl/km^{2}) (2023)	Literacy rate (2023)
Bankad Tehsil	(Urdu: تحصیل رنولیہ-بانخاد)	331	205,851	621.91	20.14%
Pattan Tehsil	(Urdu: تحصیل پٹن)	311	134,166	431.4	24.61%

=== Provincial Assembly ===
Member of Provincial Assembly	Party affiliation	Constituency	Year
Abdul Ghafar	Pakistan Tehreek-e-Insaf	PK-26 Kohistan Lower	2018

== See also ==
- Kohistan District
- Kohistan region
- Districts of Khyber Pakhtunkhwa
