= Union Councils of Peshawar District =

The following is a list of Union Councils of District Peshawar.

== Subdivisions ==
Peshawar District is divided into five towns:

- Town I
- Town II
- Town III
- Town IV
- Town V (Ex-FR Peshawar)

These towns are further subdivided into 103 union councils, with each union council having an elected "Nazim".

=== Town I ===
Union Council Name	Population 2017
UC 1 Khalsa-1	57,531
UC 2 Khalsa-2	86544
UC 3 Mahal Terrai 1	41757
UC 4 Mahal Terrai 2	85814
UC 5 Shahi Bagh	31673
UC 6 Faqairabad	22215
UC 7 Sikendar Town	32163
UC 8 Gulbahar	31,329
UC 9 Shaheen Muslim Town-1	47931
UC 10 Shaheen Muslim Town-2	40764
UC 11 Sheikh Junaid Abad	30,597
UC 12 Andar sheher	12,770
UC 13 Karim Pura	17,536
UC 14 Gunj	19,399
UC 15 Lahori	18,731
UC 16 Asia/Dabgari	25998
UC 17 Jahangir pura	16697
UC 18 Yakatoot-I	22000
UC 19 Yakatoot-II	44,555
UC 20 Yakatoot-III	36714
UC 21 Wazir Bagh	33545
UC 22 Kakshal-I	40037
UC 23 Kakshal-II	29714
UC 24 Akhun Abad	35686
UC 25 Bhana Mari	23203
Total Town I	884,903

=== Town II ===
Union Council Name	Population 2017
UC 26 Budni	33,068
UC 27 Chagharmatti	30,397
UC 28 Chamkani	45,247
UC 29 Deh Bahadar	50,818
UC 30 Ghari Sher Dad	33724
UC 31 Gulbela	42,883
UC 32 Haryana	64,300
UC 33 Hassan Ghari I	63,132
UC 34 Hassan Ghari II	49,436
UC 35 Jogani	39,613
UC 36 Kafoor Dehri	39,831
UC 37 Kaniza	40,528
UC 38 Kankola	57,865
UC 39 Khazana	65,525
UC 40 Lala Kalay	34,496
UC 41 Larama	54,959
UC 42 Mathra kamal abad	71,634
UC 43 Nahaqi	44,703
UC 44 Paiiagi	71,770
UC 45 Pakha Ghulam	58,917
UC 46 Panam Dehri	41,344
UC 47 Saeedabad (Khataki)	36,263
UC 48 Shahi bala	39181
UC 49 Tukhatabad	33,522
UC 50 Wadpaga	55,727
Total Town II	1,139,956

=== Peshawar Town III ===
Union Council Name	Population 2017
UC 51 Achini / Sangu	58,058
UC 52 Bazidkhel	54,062
UC 53 Dheri Baghbanan	27,232
UC 54 Deh Bahadar	43,312
UC 55 Hayatabad 1	98,048
UC 56 Hayatabad 2	61,081
UC 57 Landi Arbab	65,694
UC 58 Malakandher (Nasir Bagh)	65,491
UC 59 Nothia Jaded	54,184
UC 60 Nothia Qadeem	28,717
UC 61 Palosi	45,045
UC 62 Pawaka	41,014
UC 63 Pishtakhara	59,159
UC 64 Regi	41,920
UC 65 Sarband	55,414
UC 66 Shaheen Town	36,936
UC 67 Sufaid Dehri	104,405
UC 68 Tehkal Bala	47,526
UC 69 Tehkal Payan 1	42,210
UC 70 Tehkal Payan 2	42,604
UC 71 University Town	63,387
UC 72-76 Peshawar Cantt	70,741
Total Town III	1,206,241

=== Peshawar Town 4 ===
Union Council Name	Population 1998
UC 75 Urmar Bala	14007
UC 76 Urmar Miana	18992
UC 77 Urmar Payan	19261
UC 78 Musa Zai	17319
UC 79 Sheikh Muhammadi	27748
UC 80 Badhber Maryamzai	16442
UC 81 Nodeh Bala	15398
UC 82 Badhber Harizai	16108
UC 83 Mattani	26320
UC 84 Maryamzai	19336
UC 85 Mashogagar	30728
UC 86 Suleman Khel	35582
UC 87 Sheikhan	26375
UC 88 Adezai	19438
UC 89 Aza Khel	19692
UC 90 Sherkera	15787
UC 91 Surizai Payan	16744
UC 94 Mera Surizai Payan	16744
UC 93 Mera Kachori	25512
