= WSV =

WSV can mean:

- The ISO 639 code for Wotapuri-Katarqalai language
- Winter service vehicle, a snow-clearing vehicle
- Washington Square Village, an apartment complex in New York City
- Windows Server Virtualization, virtual machine software from Microsoft
- Any of a number of German football clubs:
  - SV Wehen
  - SV Wilhelmshaven
  - Wuppertaler SV
