= Mohabat Khel =

Neighbourhood in Peshawar, Pakistan

Mohabat Khel is a neighbourhood located in the village of Adezai in Peshawar, Pakistan. It is a heavily populated area with almost all its people being followers of Islam and typically Pashtuns by race. Related to Mohabat Khel subtribe of Cis Indus Swatis in Allai. Mohabat Khel is known for its old-fashioned streets and simple mud houses. Conventional education, though previously considered awkward, un-Islamic and unimportant in the neighbourhood, is growing.

There is a small fresh water canal flowing through its heart, which is a natural habitat for numerous freshwater fish including the lung fish (called mur-mera in the local language). Mohabat Khel has mohalla Fateh Khel to its east, Khalizay to its north and Akakhel to its south.
