= Tarawari =

Tarawari may refer to:

- Taraori, a town in Haryana, India
- Tarawari language, spoken in Khyber Pakhtunkhwa, Pakistan
