= Green Park City =

Neighborhood of Bin QasimTown in Karachi, Sindh, Pakistan

Coordinates: 32°20′N 71°55′E

Green Park City is one of the neighborhoods of Bin Qasim in Karachi, Sindh, Pakistan.

There are several ethnic groups in Green Park City including Hazarewal are the 70% of total population of green park city ans Sindhis, Kashmiris, Seraikis, Pakhtuns, Balochs, Brahuis, Memons, Bohras, Christians and Ismailis.
