= Kohistani languages =

Language group within Indo-Aryan language family

- Geographic distribution: Kohistan, Pakistan
- Ethnicity: Kohistani people
- Linguistic classification: Indo-European: Indo-Iranian; Indo-Aryan; Dardic; Kohistani languages
- Subdivisions: Indus Kohistani (Maiyã); Bateri; Chilisso; Gawri (Kalami); Gowro; Torwali; Mankiyali; Wotapuri-Katarqalai; Tirahi

Language codes
- Glottolog: kohi1251

Distribution of Kohistani as a first, second, and third largest mother tongue by district in Pakistan

The Kohistani languages are a group of several Indo-Aryan languages of the Dardic group spoken in the Kohistan region of Pakistan, and surrounding areas. Most of the languages are severely endangered or nearly extinct, while Indus Kohistani, Gawri and Torwali are comparatively more widely spoken.

== Terminology ==
The term Kohistani is a Persian-derived term meaning "related to the mountains." Historically, it was used by outsiders, particularly during the Mughal period and after 16th-century Pashtun expansions, to refer broadly to populations inhabiting mountainous regions of what is now northern Pakistan and adjoining areas. The name was also applied by Pashtuns during their incursions to the region to "All other Muhammadans of Indian descent in the Hindu Kush valleys."

== Development ==
Linguistic evidence link the Kohistani languages with the Gandhari language, and were once more widespread in the region.

The last to disappear was Tirahi, still spoken in a few villages in the vicinity of Jalalabad in eastern Afghanistan in the late 20th-century, by descendants of migrants expelled from Tirah by the Afridi Pashtuns in the 19th century. Georg Morgenstierne claimed that Tirahi is "probably the remnant of a dialect group extending from Tirah through the Peshawar District into Swat and Dir." Nowadays, it must be entirely extinct and the region is now dominated by Iranian languages brought in by later immigrations, such as Pashto.

Among the modern day Indo-Aryan languages still spoken today, Torwali shows the closest linguistic affinity possible to Niya, a dialect of Gāndhārī.

== Classification ==
In linguistic scholarship, Kohistani languages refers to a subgroup of closely related Indo-Aryan languages such as Indus Kohistani, Bateri, Chilisso, Gawri, Gawro, Torwali, Mankiyali, Wotapuri-Katarqalai, and Tirahi. These languages are mutually unintelligible, and speakers typically resort to a third language, most commonly Pashto or Urdu, for intergroup communication.

However, in official Pakistani usage, the designation Kohistani has often been applied ambiguously and inconsistently. In provincial legislation and education policy in Khyber Pakhtunkhwa since 2011, as well as in the 2023 Pakistani census, Kohistani has been used to refer specifically to Indus Kohistani, spoken in Indus Kohistan. Other languages commonly identified by their speakers as Kohistani in a geographic or social sense, such as Torwali, Gawri, and Kohistani Shina (a Shina dialect), were not separately enumerated and were often recorded either under Kohistani or under "Other."
