= Mankiyali language =

Indo-Aryan language of northern Pakistan

Mankiyali
- Native to: Pakistan
- Region: Mansehra District, Khyber Pakhtunkhwa
- Ethnicity: Trawara
- Native speakers: 500 (2016)
- Language family: Indo-European: Indo-Iranian; Indo-Aryan; Dardic; Kohistani; Mankiyali

Language codes
- ISO 639-3: nlm
- Glottolog: mank1256
- Coordinates: 34°28′56″N 72°57′05.3″E

Mankiyali is an endangered Indo-Aryan language of the Dardic sub-branch spoken in Khyber Pakhtunkhwa, northern Pakistan. It is spoken by a small community sometimes referred to as the Trawara in the secluded village of Danna (or Dana) located in the Bandi Shungli union council of Mansehra District. Some speakers of the language are also scattered in the neighbouring villages of Damaka, Guldar, Arghaniya, Chamrasi and Shoshni. The whole community has been reported to be bilingual in Hindko, the language of wider communication in the Hazara area. The language is still being passed on to the next generation, but overall it is losing ground to Hindko. The first study documenting the existence of the language was published only in 2015. The name Mankiyali is of recent origin, having been coined by members of the community to replace the older terms Tarawara and Tarawari, which are now seen as stigmatising.

Mankiyali is not mutually intelligible with any of the surrounding languages. Lexical similarity tests have revealed that it shares a little over a third of its core vocabulary with the local varieties of Hindko and Gojri, and a slightly higher percentage (41–42%) with Gowro and Bateri – two languages of the Kohistani group of Dardic. The somewhat higher similarity with Bateri could indicate a common origin, which would be consistent with the oral traditions of the community.

Mankiyali has been influenced by Hindko and Gojri, particularly in the development of phonemic tone: a preliminary analysis indicated that its tonal system is of the Punjabi type, shared with Hindko and Gojri and contrasting with the systems found in northern Dardic languages. The voiced aspirates have been lost, conditioning a low rising tone on the following vowel. There are contrasting dental (/ts/) and palatal (/tʃ/ /tʃʰ/) affricates.

== Bibliography ==
- Anjum, Uzma (2016). Language Shift and the Speech Community: A Sociolinguistic Study of Tarawara Community in Bandi Shungli (PhD). National University of Modern Languages, Islamabad.
- Anjum, Uzma; Rehman, Khawaja (2015). "A First Look at Mankiyali Language: An Endangered Language". Journal of Asian Civilizations. 38 (1): 177–90. ProQuest 1816873650.
- Anjum, Uzma; Kiani, Zafeer Hussain; Khan, Qaisar (2018). "Gender Variation in Language Use in Family: A Study of an Endangered Language Spoken in North Pakistan" (PDF). Kashmir Journal of Language Research. 21 (1): 123–132. ISSN 1028-6640. Archived from the original (PDF) on 2020-07-16.
- Munshi, Sadaf (2017). Request for Change to ISO 639-3 Language Code 2017-028 (Report).
