= Kundal Shahi language =

Indo-Aryan language of Pakistan

Kundal Shahi
- کنڈل شاہی; Kunḍal Šāhī
- Native to: Pakistan
- Region: Neelam Valley
- Native speakers: 700 (2005)
- Language family: Indo-European: Indo-Iranian; Indo-Aryan; Eastern Dardic; Shinaic; Kundal Shahi

Language codes
- ISO 639-3: shd
- Glottolog: kund1257
- Coordinates: 34.5548°N 73.8439°E

Kundal Shahi (کنڈل شاہی, Kunḍal Šāhī) is an Indo-Aryan language spoken by about 700 people in the Kundal Shahi village of Neelam Valley in Azad Kashmir, Pakistan. It is an endangered language and its speakers are shifting to Hindko.

== Phonology ==
The following tables set out the phonology of Kundal Shahi.

=== Vowels ===
Kundal Shahi is unusual amongst Dardic languages in that it has front rounded vowels.

	Front		Central	Back
	unrounded	rounded	unrounded	rounded
Close	i iː	y yː		u uː
Close-Mid	e eː	øː	ə	o oː
Open-Mid	ɛ ɛː		ʌ	ɔ ɔː
Open			a aː	

=== Consonants ===
Like Kashmiri, Kundal Shahi is unusual amongst Dardic languages in that it lacks retroflex fricatives and affricates.

		Labial	Alveolar	Retroflex	Palatal	Velar	Glottal
Nasal		m	n	ɳ		(ŋ)	
Plosive/ Affricate	voiceless	p	t	ʈ	tʃ	k	
Plosive/ Affricate	aspirated	pʰ	tʰ	ʈʰ	tʃʰ	kʰ	
Plosive/ Affricate	voiced	b	d	ɖ	dʒ	ɡ	
Fricative	voiceless	f	s		ʃ	x	h
Fricative	voiced		z				
Lateral			l				
Flap			ɾ	ɽ			
Approximant					j	w	

=== Tone ===
Kundal Shahi, like many Dardic languages, has either phonemic tone or, as in Kundal Shahi, pitch accent. Words may have only one accented mora, which is associated with high pitch; the remaining mora have a default or low pitch.

== Endangered ==
Kundal Shahi is severely endangered with less than 500 speakers, most of whom are over the age of 40.

== Bibliography ==
- Baart, Joan L. G. (2003), Tonal features in languages of northern Pakistan (PDF), National Institute of Pakistan Studies, Quaid-i-Azam University and Summer Institute of Linguistics, pp. 3, 6
- Baart, Joan L. G.; Rehman, Khawaja A. (2005). "A first look at the language of Kundal Shahi in Azad Kashmir". SIL Electronic Working Papers.
