= Chilisso language =

Dardic language spoken in eastern Kohistan, Pakistan

Chilisso
- Region: Eastern Kohistan, Pakistan
- Native speakers: (1,000 cited 1992)
- Language family: Indo-European: Indo-Iranian; Indo-Aryan; Dardic; Kohistani; Chilisso

Language codes
- ISO 639-3: clh
- Glottolog: chil1275
- ELP: Chilisso

Chilisso is an Indo-Aryan language spoken by a thousand people in eastern Kohistan, Pakistan.
