= Peshawar District =

Coordinates: 34°00′N 71°45′E

Peshawar District ضلع پشاور پېښور ولسوالۍ پشور ضلع
- District
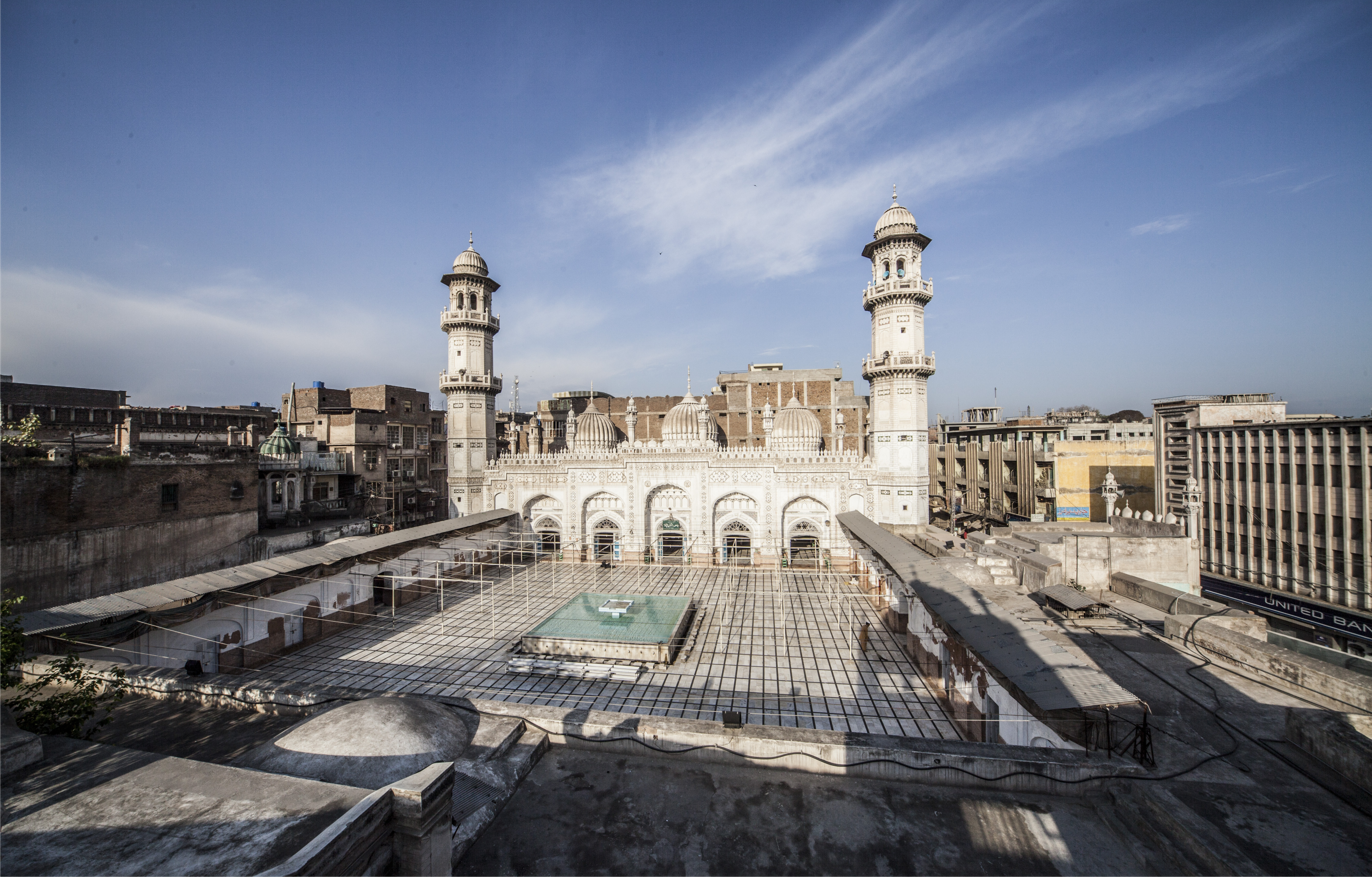
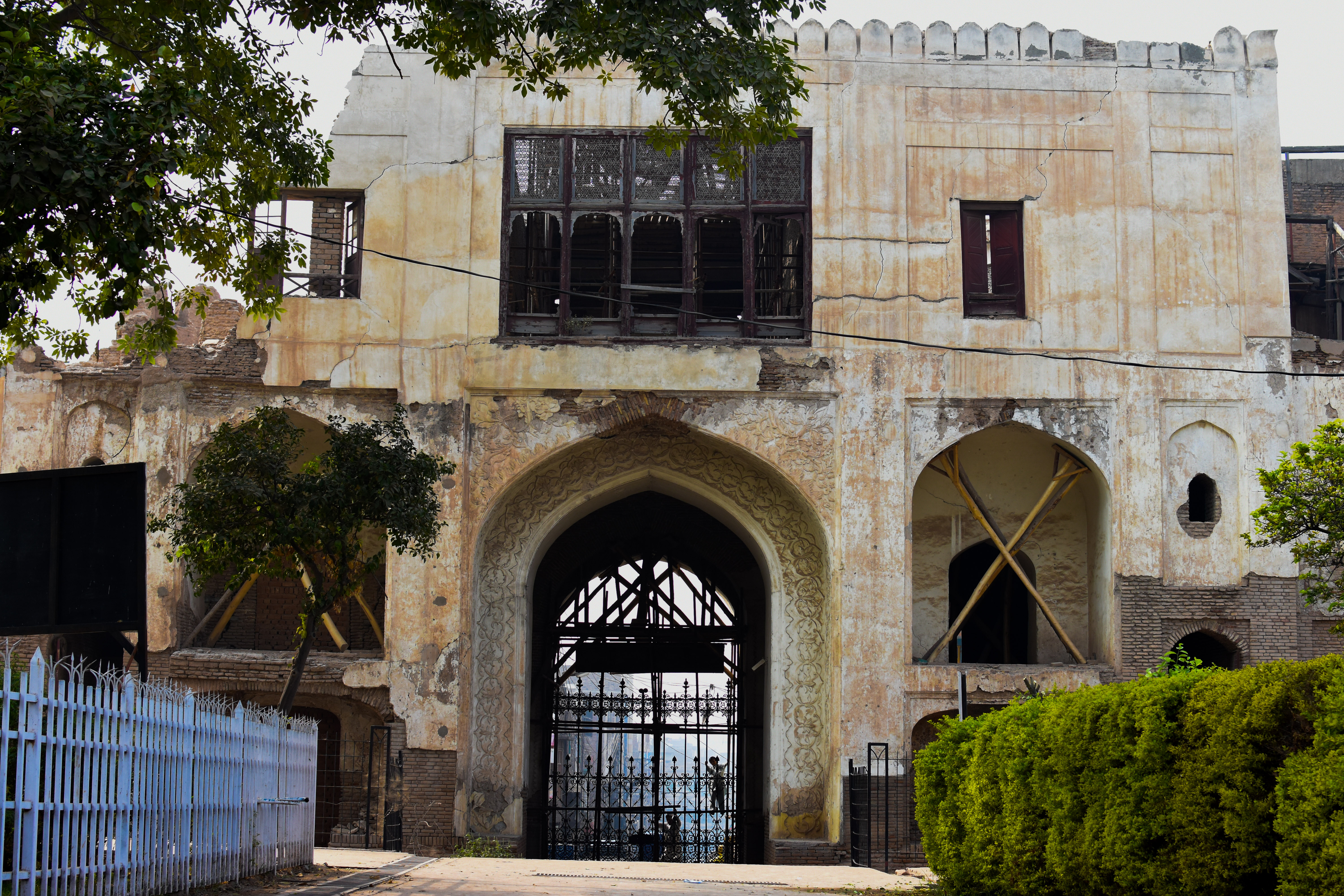
- Top: Mahabat Khan Mosque; Bottom: Entrance to Gorkhatri

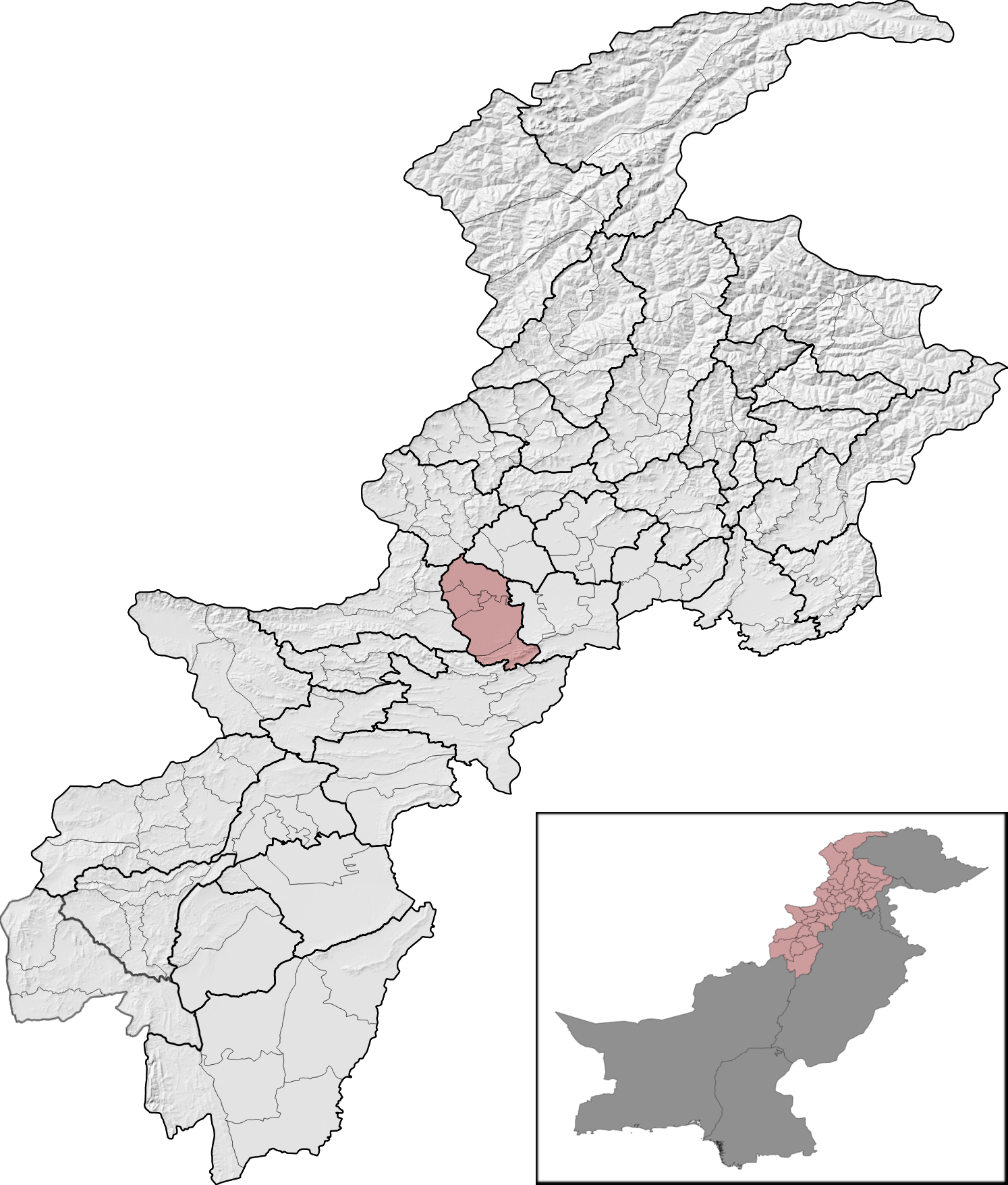
- Peshawar District (red) in Khyber Pakhtunkhwa
- Country: Pakistan
- Province: Khyber-Pakhtunkhwa
- Division: Peshawar
- Headquarter: Peshawar

Government
  - Type: District Administration
  - District Commissioner: Syed Musa Raza
  - Number of Tehsils: 7
  - Number of Local Urban Councils (NC): 130
  - Number of Local Rural Councils (VC): 227
  - Total Local Councils (NC&VC): 357

Area
  - District: 1,518 km^{2} (586 sq mi)

Population (2023)
  - District: 4,758,762
  - Density: 3,135/km^{2} (8,120/sq mi)
  - Urban: 1,905,884
  - Rural: 2,900,465

Languages
  - Official: English , Urdu
  - Spoken: Pashto, Hindko, Punjabi, Kohistani

Peshawar District (Pashto: پېښور ولسوالۍ, Hindko: ضلع پشور, Urdu: ضلع پشاور) is a district in the Peshawar Division of the Khyber Pakhtunkhwa province of Pakistan. It is located about 160 km west of the Pakistan's capital Islamabad. The district headquarter is the city of Peshawar, which is also the capital of Khyber Paktunkhwa.

== History ==
=== Ancient History ===
==== Foundation and Early Invasions ====
Peshawar was established as the city of Puruṣapura on the Gandhara Plains in the broad Valley of Peshawar, after 100 CE. It may have been named after a Hindu raja who ruled the city and was known as Purush. The city likely first existed as a small village in the fifth century BCE, near the ancient Gandharan capital city of Pushkalavati, close to present-day Charsadda. In the winter of 327–26 BCE, Alexander the Great subdued the Valley of Peshawar during his invasion of the Indus Valley, as well as the nearby Swat and Buner valleys. Following Alexander's conquest, the Valley of Peshawar came under the suzerainty of Seleucus I Nicator, founder of the Seleucid Empire. A locally made vase fragment that was found in Peshawar depicts a scene from Sophocles' play Antigone, highlighting the cultural reach of the Hellenistic world.

==== Mauryan, Greek, Parthian Rule ====
Following the Seleucid–Mauryan war, the region was ceded to the Mauryan Empire in 303 BCE. Around 300 BCE, the Greek diplomat and historian Megasthenes noted that Purushapura was the western terminus of a Mauryan road that connected the city to the empire's capital at Pataliputra, near the modern-day city of Patna in the Indian state of Bihar. As Mauryan power declined, the Greco-Bactrian Kingdom, based in modern Afghanistan, declared its independence from the Seleucid Empire and quickly seized the region around 190 BCE. The city was then captured by Gondophares, founder of the Indo-Parthian Kingdom, who established the nearby Takht-i-Bahi monastery in 46 CE.

==== The Kushan Empire ====
In the first century CE, Purushapura came under the control of Kujula Kadphises, founder of the Kushan Empire, and was made the empire's winter capital. The Kushan's summer capital at Kapisi (modern Bagram, Afghanistan) was seen as the secondary capital, while Purushapura was considered to be the empire's primary capital. Ancient Peshawar's population was estimated to be 120,000, which would make it the seventh-most populous city in the world at the time. As a devout Buddhist, the emperor built the grand Kanishka Mahavihara monastery. After his death, the magnificent Kanishka stupa was built in Peshawar to house Buddhist relics. The golden age of the Kushan empire in Peshawar ended in 232 CE with the death of the last great Kushan king, Vasudeva I.

==== Sasanian Invasions ====
Around 260 CE, the armies of the Sasanid Emperor Shapur I launched an attack against Peshawar and severely damaged Buddhist monuments and monasteries throughout the Valley of Peshawar. Shapur's campaign also resulted in damage to the city's monumental stupa and monastery. The Kushans were made subordinate to the Sasanids and their power rapidly dwindled, as the Sasanids blocked lucrative trade routes westward out of the city. Kushan Emperor Kanishka III was able to temporarily reestablish control over the entire Valley of Peshawar after Shapur's invasion, but the city was then captured by the Central Asian Kidarite kingdom in the early 400s CE.

==== The White Huns ====
The White Huns devastated ancient Peshawar in the 460s CE and ravaged the entire region of Gandhara, destroying its numerous monasteries. The Kanishka stupa was rebuilt during the White Hun era with the construction of a tall wooden superstructure, built atop a stone base, and crowned with a 13-layer copper-gilded chatra. In the 400s CE, the Chinese Buddhist pilgrim Faxian visited the structure and described it as "the highest of all the towers" in the "terrestrial world", which ancient travelers claimed was up to 170.6 metres (560 ft) tall, though modern estimates suggest a height of 121.9 metres (400 ft). In 520 CE, the Chinese monk Song Yun visited Gandhara and ancient Peshawar during the White Hun era and noted that it was in conflict with nearby Kapisa. The Chinese monk and traveler Xuanzang visited ancient Peshawar around 630 CE, after Kapisa's victory, and expressed lament that the city and its great Buddhist monuments had decayed to ruin—although some monks studying Theravada Buddhism continued to study at the monastery's ruins. Xuanzang estimated that only about 1,000 families continued in a small quarter among the ruins of the former grand capital.

=== Medieval History ===
==== Hindu Shahis ====
Until the mid-seventh century, the residents of ancient Peshawar were ruled by Kabul Shahis, who were then displaced by the Hindu Shahis of Kabul. Islam is believed to have been first introduced to the Buddhist, Hindu and other indigenous inhabitants of Purushapura in the later seventh century. In 986–87 CE, Peshawar's first encounter with Muslim armies occurred when Sabuktigin invaded the area and fought the Hindu Shahis under their king, Anandpal. On 28 November 1001, Sabuktigin's son Mahmud Ghazni decisively defeated the army of Raja Jayapala, son of Anandpal, at the Battle of Peshawar and established the rule of the Ghaznavid Empire in the region. During the Ghaznavid era, Peshawar served as an important stop between the Afghan plateau and the Ghaznavid garrison city of Lahore. During the tenth–12th century, Peshawar served as a headquarters for Hindu Nath Panthi Yogis, who in turn are believed to have extensively interacted with Muslim Sufi mystics. As the first Pashtun tribe to settle in the region, the Dilazak Pashtuns began settling in the Valley of Peshawar and are believed to have settled regions up to the Indus River by the 11th century. The Arab historian and geographer al-Masudi noted that by the mid-tenth century, the city had become known as Parashāwar.

==== Delhi Sultanate ====
In 1179–80, Muhammad Ghori captured Peshawar, though the city was then destroyed in the early 1200s at the hands of the Mongols. Peshawar was an important regional centre under the Lodi dynasty of the Delhi Sultanate. Several other Pashtun tribes began settling rural regions around Peshawar in the late 15th and 16th centuries. The Ghoryakhel and Khashi Khel tribes pushed the Dilazak Pashtun tribes east of the Indus River following a battle in 1515 near the city of Mardan. Hindko continued to be the language of trade and business in the city.

==== Mughal Empire ====
In July 1526, Emperor Babur captured Peshawar. During Babur's rule, the city was known as Begram, and he rebuilt the city's fort, using it as a base for expeditions to other nearby towns. Peshawar remained an important centre on trade routes between India and Central Asia during the Mughal period, and the region was a cosmopolitan area in which goods, peoples, and ideas would pass along trade routes. Its importance as a trade centre is highlighted by the destruction of over one thousand camel-loads of merchandise following an accidental fire at Bala Hissar fort in 1586. Under the reign of Babur's son, Humayun, direct Mughal rule over the city was briefly challenged with the rise of the Pashtun king, Sher Shah Suri, who began construction of the famous Grand Trunk Road in the 16th century. Mughal rule in the area was tenuous, as Mughal suzerainty was only firmly exercised in the Peshawar valley, while the neighbouring valley of Swat was under Mughal rule only during the reign of Akbar. During Akbar's rule, the name of the city changed from Begram to Peshawar. In 1586, Pashtuns rose against Mughal rule during the Roshani Revolt under the leadership of Bayazid Pir Roshan, founder of the egalitarian Roshani movement, who assembled Pashtun armies in an attempted rebellion against the Mughals; the Roshani followers laid siege to the city until 1587. Peshawar was bestowed with its own set of Shalimar Gardens during the reign of Shah Jahan, which no longer exist. Emperor Aurangzeb's governor of Kabul, Mohabbat Khan, used Peshawar as his winter capital during the 17th century and bestowed the city with its famous Mohabbat Khan Mosque in 1630. The Yusufzai tribes rose against Mughal rule during the Yusufzai Revolt of 1667 and engaged in pitched-battles with Mughal battalions near Attock. The Afridi tribes resisted Mughal rule during the Afridi Revolt of the 1670s; they massacred a Mughal battalion in the nearby Khyber Pass in 1672 and shut the pass to lucrative trade routes. Mughal armies led by Emperor Aurangzeb himself regained control of the entire area in 1674. Following the death of Aurangzeb in 1707, his son Bahadur Shah I, former governor of Peshawar and Kabul, was selected to be the new Mughal Emperor, but as Mughal power declined, the empire's defenses were severely weakened. On 18 November 1738, Peshawar was captured from the Mughal governor Nawab Nasir Khan by the Afsharid armies during the Persian invasion of the Mughal Empire under Nader Shah.

==== Durrani Empire ====
In 1747, Peshawar was taken by Ahmad Shah Durrani, founder of the Afghan Durrani Empire. The city was captured in spring of 1758 by the Maratha Confederacy in alliance with the Sikhs. Before that, the fort of Peshawar was being guarded by Durrani troops under Timur Shah Durrani and Jahan Khan. When Raghunathrao, Malhar Rao Holkar and the Sikh alliance of Charat Singh and Jassa Singh Ahluwalia left Peshawar, Tukoji Rao Holkar was appointed as the representative in this area of the sub-continent. In the following year, Ahmad Shah again occupied the city. Under the reign of his son Timur Shah, the Mughal practice of using Kabul as a summer capital and Peshawar as a winter capital was reintroduced, with the practice maintained until the Sikh invasion. Peshawar's Bala Hissar Fort served as the residence of Afghan kings during their winter stay, and it was noted to be the main centre of trade between Bukhara and India by British explorer William Moorcroft during the late 1700s. Peshawar was at the centre of a productive agricultural region that provided much of north India's dried fruit. Timur Shah's grandson, Mahmud Shah Durrani, became king and quickly seized Peshawar from his half-brother, Shah Shuja Durrani. Shah Shujah was then himself proclaimed king in 1803 and recaptured Peshawar while Mahmud Shah was imprisoned at Bala Hissar fort until his eventual escape. In 1809, the British sent an emissary to the court of Shah Shujah in Peshawar, marking the first diplomatic meeting between the British and Afghans. His half-brother Mahmud Shah then allied himself with the Barakzai Pashtuns and captured Peshawar once again, reigning until the Battle of Nowshera in March 1823.

==== Sikh Empire ====
Ranjit Singh invaded Peshawar in 1818, but handed its rule to Peshawar Sardars as vassals. Following the Sikh victory against Azim Khan at Nowshera in March 1823, Ranjit Singh captured Peshawar again and reinstated Yar Mohammed as the governor. By 1830, Peshawar's economy was noted by Scottish explorer Alexander Burnes to have sharply declined, with Ranjit Singh's forces having destroyed the city's palace and agricultural fields. Much of Peshawar's caravan trade from Kabul ceased on account of skirmishes between Afghan and Sikh forces, as well as a punitive tax levied on merchants by Ranjit Singh's forces. Singh's government also required Peshawar to forfeit much of its leftover agricultural output to the Sikhs as tribute, while agriculture was further decimated by a collapse of the dried fruit market in north India. Singh appointed Neapolitan mercenary Paolo Avitabile as administrator of Peshawar, who is remembered for having unleashed a reign of terror; his time in Peshawar is known as a time of "gallows and gibbets". The city's famous Mahabat Khan Mosque, built in 1630 in the Jeweler's Bazaar, was badly damaged and desecrated by the Sikh occupation. The Sikh Empire formally annexed Peshawar in 1834 following advances from the armies of Hari Singh Nalwa, bringing the city under direct control of the Sikh Empire's Lahore Durbar. An 1835 attempt by Dost Muhammad Khan to re-occupy the city was unsuccessful after being unable to breach the Peshawar fort's defenses. Sikh settlers from Punjab were settled in the city during Sikh rule; the city's only remaining Gurdwaras were built by Hari Singh Nalwa to accommodate the newly settled Sikhs. The Sikhs also rebuilt the Bala Hissar fort during their occupation of the city.

== Demographics ==
=== Population ===
Historical population
Year	Pop.	±% p.a.
1951	424,937	—
1961	572,443	+3.02%
1972	867,144	+3.85%
1981	1,150,364	+3.19%
1998	2,080,692	+3.55%
2017	4,331,959	+3.94%
2023	4,758,762	+1.58%

As of the 2023 census, Peshawar district has 690,976 households and a population of 4,758,762. The district has a sex ratio of 103.99 males to 100 females and a literacy rate of 53%: 65% for males and 41% for females. 1,355,625 (28.54% of the surveyed population) are under 10 years of age. Approximately 1,905,975 (40.05%) live in urban areas.

=== Languages ===
Languages of Peshawar district (2023)
1. Pashto (93.1%)
2. Hindko (3.79%)
3. Urdu (1.80%)
4. Punjabi (0.55%)
5. Others (mainly Gujari, Kohistani) (0.79%)

At the time of the 2023, 93.07% of the district’s population spoke Pashto, 3.79% Hindko, 1.8% Urdu and 0.55% Punjabi as their first language. Due to the settlement of Afghan refugees and language shift Pashto has gained ground at the expense of Hindko. Other minority spoken languages are Gujari and Kohistani. As per 2023 estimates by Tablue Public in Peshawar District Gujari along with Kohistani is spoken by 0.10% of the population.

According to linguists, the nearly-extinct Tirahi language was likely spoken in the region before the arrival of the Afghans.

=== Ethnic groups ===
The main ethnic groups in Peshawar district are:

- Hindkowan
- Gujjar
- Pashtun
- Kohistani

=== Religion ===
Religions in Peshawar district (2023)
Religion	Percent
Islam	99.21%
Christianity	0.70%
Other	0.09%

Muslims make up the majority in Peshawar. Peshawar once had significant minorities of Hindus and Sikhs living in the small towns and Peshawar city, but most fled during Partition. 1,800 Hindus and 1,400 Sikhs remain in the district. Christians however have continued to grow.

Religion in contemporary Peshawar District
Religious group	1941		2017		2023	
Religious group	Pop.	%	Pop.	%	Pop.	%
Islam	335,871	86.27%	4,300,937	99.28%	4,713,004	99.21%
Hinduism	33,551	8.62%	1,811	0.04%	1,822	0.04%
Sikhism	15,454	3.97%	—N/a	—N/a	1,481	0.03%
Christianity	2,618	0.67%	25,125	0.58%	33,249	0.70%
Zoroastrianism	—N/a	—N/a	—N/a	—N/a	5	~0%
Others	1,835	0.49%	2,561	0.06%	827	0.02%
Total Population	389,329	100%	4,331,959	100%	4,750,388	100%
Note: 1941 census data is for Peshawar tehsil of erstwhile Peshawar district, which roughly corresponds to contemporary Peshawar district sans former Frontier Region Peshawar. District and tehsil borders have changed since 1941.

Religious groups in Peshawar District (British North-West Frontier Province era)
Religious group	1881		1891		1901		1911		1921		1931		1941	
Religious group	Pop.	%	Pop.	%	Pop.	%	Pop.	%	Pop.	%	Pop.	%	Pop.	%
Islam	546,117	92.14%	654,443	92.99%	732,870	92.92%	807,788	93.38%	836,222	92.16%	898,683	92.24%	769,589	90.35%
Hinduism	39,321	6.63%	35,417	5.03%	40,183	5.09%	35,367	4.09%	48,144	5.31%	42,321	4.34%	51,212	6.01%
Christianity	4,088	0.69%	4,742	0.67%	4,288	0.54%	5,604	0.65%	7,652	0.84%	8,974	0.92%	6,890	0.81%
Sikhism	3,103	0.52%	9,125	1.3%	11,318	1.44%	16,196	1.87%	15,326	1.69%	24,271	2.49%	24,030	2.82%
Zoroastrianism	39	0.01%	37	0.01%	46	0.01%	49	0.01%	20	0%	59	0.01%	24	0%
Jainism	3	0%	0	0%	0	0%	4	0%	3	0%	0	0%	0	0%
Buddhism	0	0%	0	0%	0	0%	0	0%	0	0%	2	0%	18	0%
Judaism	—N/a	—N/a	4	0%	2	0%	1	0%	0	0%	11	0%	70	0.01%
Others	3	0%	0	0%	0	0%	0	0%	0	0%	0	0%	0	0%
Total population	592,674	100%	703,768	100%	788,707	100%	865,009	100%	907,367	100%	974,321	100%	851,833	100%
Note: British North-West Frontier Province era district borders are not an exact match in the present-day due to various bifurcations to district borders — which since created new districts — throughout the region during the post-independence era that have taken into account population increases.

=== 1897 Gazetteer ===
According to the 1897 district gazetteer, published during the British Raj, most people living in Peshawar valley were Pathans and belonged to an agricultural community but there was also large number of Punjabi and Hindkowan communities living in the valley; all three ethnolinguistic groups religiously belonged to Islam, Hinduism and Sikhism. Most people in the Peshawar city spoke and understood Urdu, while economic elites from small towns such as big feudal Khan families, traders, alongside many Hindus also spoke Urdu. Persian was also spoken by elites of the Peshawar city and by traders from Kabul, despite a majority of the district population especially the agriculturists and Pathans only spoke Pashto.

At the time, during the late 19th century, approximately 92–93 percent of the total population of Peshawar Valley followed Islam, while the remaining 7–8 percent followed Hinduism, Sikhism and other religions. Persons adhering to minority religions primarily lived in major urban centres, cities, towns, and cantonments such as Peshawar, Charsadda (now in the Charsadda District) and Hoti (now in the Mardan District). 97 percent of the population living in rural towns practiced Islam.

=== Refugees ===
In recent years, Peshawar district hosts up to 20% of all Afghan refugees in Pakistan. In 2005, Peshawar district was home to 611,501 Afghan refugees who constituted 19.7% of the district's total population. Peshawar's immediate environs were home to large Afghan refugee camps, with Jalozai camp hosting up to 300,000 refugees in 2001 making it the largest refugee camp in Asia at the time. By 1980, 100,000 refugees a month were entering the province, with 25% of all refugees living in Peshawar district in 1981.

Afghan refugees began to be frequently accused of involvement with terrorist attacks that occurred during Pakistan's war against radical Islamists. By 2015 the Pakistani government adopted a policy to repatriate Afghan refugees, including many who had spent their entire life in Pakistan. The policy of repatriation was also encouraged by the government of Afghanistan, though many refugees had not registered themselves in Pakistan. Un registered refugees returning to Afghanistan without their old Afghan identification documents now have no official status in Afghanistan either.

== Administration ==
The district Peshawar is administrated by Deputy commissioner who is chief administrative, land revenue officer and the representative of government in district. DC is assisted by Additional Deputy commissioner and Assistant commissioner. Peshawar is divided into seven tehsil which are further divided into village council (rural areas) and neighbourhood council (urban areas). There are total 357 councils in peshawar district out of which 130 are neighbourhood councils and 227 are village councils. Each tehsil has its own government known as tehsil municipal administration having an elected tehsil council and tehsil chairman except Peshawar city tehsil, which is administrated by a city local government, which is composed of an elected city council and an elected mayor.

=== Tehsils of Peshawar District ===
Tehsil	Name (Urdu) (Pashto)	Area (km²)	Pop. (2023)	Density (ppl/km²) (2023)	Literacy rate (2023)	Union Councils
Badbher Tehsil	(Urdu: تحصیل بڈبھیر)(Pashto: بډبیر تحصیل)	357	439,912	1,232.25	38.66%	
Chamkani Tehsil	(Urdu: تحصیل چمکنی)(Pashto: چمکني تحصیل)	226	624,354	2,762.63	54.72%	
Hassan Khel Tehsil	(Urdu: تحصیل حسن خیل)(Pashto: حسن خېل تحصیل)	261	72,557	278	55.34%	
Mathra Tehsil	(Urdu: تحصیل متھرا)(Pashto: متهرا تحصیل)	218	495,059	2,270.91	45.79%	
Peshawar City Tehsil	(Urdu: تحصیل پشاور شہر)(Pashto: پېښور ښار تحصیل)	176	2,113,596	12,009.07	60.88%	
Peshtakhara Tehsil	(Urdu: تحصیل پشتخرہ)(Pashto: پشتخرې تحصیل)	135	480,436	3,558.79	45.45%	
Shah Alam Tehsil	(Urdu: تحصیل شاہ عالم)(Pashto: شاه عالم تحصیل)	145	532,848	3,674.81	44.96%	

=== Neighbourhood and Village Councils of Peshawar District ===
1. Peshawar City Tehsil Village Councils = 9 Neighbourhood Councils =121 Total Councils = 130. 2. Badhaber tehsil Village Councils = 37 Neighbourhood Councils = 0 Total Councils = 37. 3. Chamkani tehsil Village Councils = 42 Neighbourhood Councils = 4 Total Councils = 46. 4. Shah Alam tehsil Village Councils = 41 Neighbourhood Councils = 2 Total Councils = 43. 5. Pishtakhara tehsil Village Councils = 34 Neighbourhood Councils = 2 Total Councils = 36. 6. Mathra tehsil Village Councils = 53 Neighbourhood Councils = 1 Total Councils = 54. 7. Hassan Khel Village Councils = 11 Neighbourhood Councils = 0 Total Councils = 11.

Each Village and Neighborhood Council is composed of 7 Members which are as given below

1. Chairman of VC or NC

2. Vice Chairman of VC or NC

3. General Councilor

4. Women Councilor

5. Youth Councilor

6. Worker and Peasant Councilor

7. Minority Councilor

These members are elected by voter directly through local elections

=== Provincial Assembly Seats ===
According to new delimitation list made by election commission of Pakistan the district Peshawar is represented in provincial assembly through 14 constituencies. Currently all seats are empty because assembly is dissolved and new elections are going to happen soon.

Member of Provincial Assembly	Constituency
assembly dissolved	PK-69 Peshawar-I
assembly dissolved	PK-70 Peshawar-II
assembly dissolved	PK-71Peshawar-III
assembly dissolved	PK-72 Peshawar-IV
assembly dissolved	PK-73 Peshawar-V
assembly dissolved	PK-74 Peshawar-VI
assembly dissolved	PK-75 Peshawar-VII
assembly dissolved	PK-76 Peshawar-VIII
assembly dissolved	PK-77 Peshawar-IX
assembly dissolved	PK-78 Peshawar-X
assembly dissolved	PK-79 Peshawar-XI
assembly dissolved	PK-80 Peshawar-XII
assembly dissolved	PK-81 Peshawar-XIII
assembly dissolved	PK-82 Peshawar-XIV

=== National Assembly Seats ===
The district is represented in the Pakistan National Assembly by five (5) members.

Constituency	Member of National Assembly
NA 28 Peshawar I	Vacant
NA 29 Peshawar II	Vacant
NA 30 Peshawar III	Vacant
NA 31 Peshawar IV	Vacant
NA 32 Peshawar V	Vacant

== Education ==
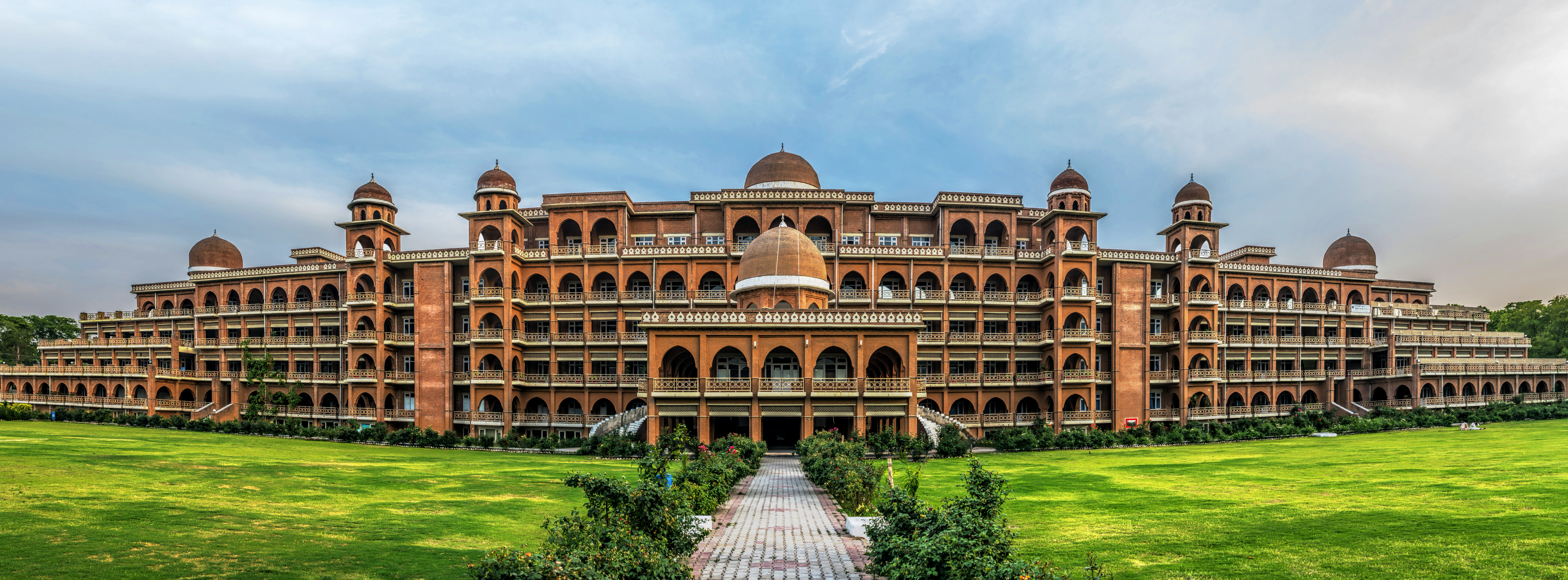
University of Peshawar (Public Sector)

Peshawar District has many universities for various disciplines starting from Humanities, General Sciences, Sciences, Engineering Sciences to Medical Sciences, Agriculture Sciences and Management Sciences. Currently, there are nine medical colleges of which two are in the public sector, including Khyber Medical University, and seven in the private sector, which all are recognised and approved by Pakistan Medical and Dental Association.

The first public sector university was the University of Peshawar which was established in 1950. The University of Engineering and Technology, Peshawar and the University of Agriculture, Peshawar were also established in 1980 and 1981 respectively. The first private sector university CECOS University of IT and Emerging Sciences, started functioning in 1986. Soon after, another university by the name of Brains Institute and post graduate college was established. In 1995, a public sector management institute named as Institute of Management Sciences was established, which became degree awarding institute in 2005.

In 2001, four (4) new private sector universities started working in Peshawar. The name of these universities are Qurtuba University, Sarhad University of Science and IT, Fast University, Peshawar Campus and City University of Science and IT. Gandhara University was established in 2002 while Abasyn University was created in 2007.

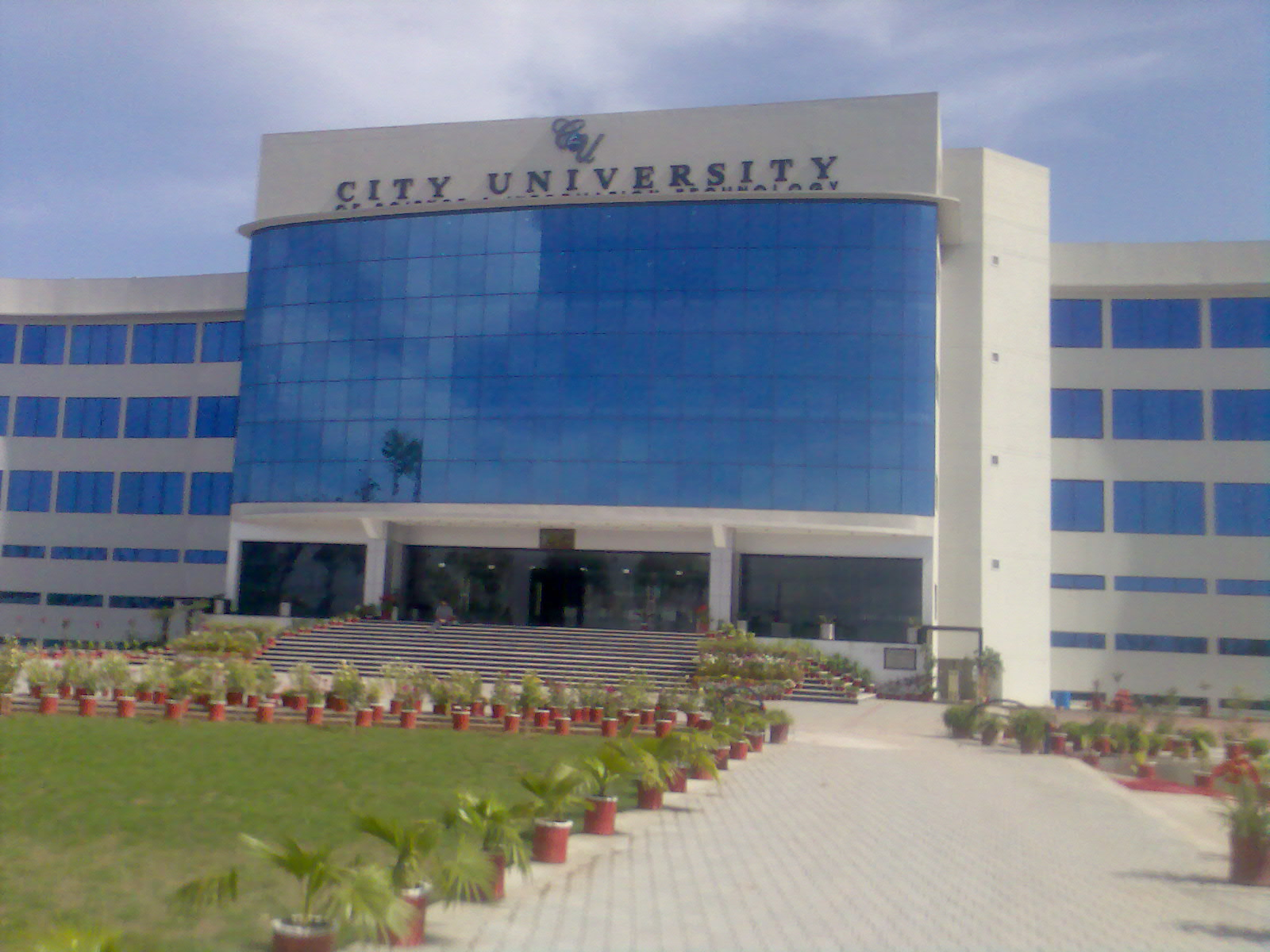
City University Peshawar (Private Sector)

In 2007, Government of Khyber Pakhtunkhwa established first public sector medical university, Khyber Medical University and the district also has 2 public sector medical colleges, one is Khyber Medical College and one for girls named as Khyber Girls Medical College.

The first women university was established in 2012, when Shaheed Benazir Bhutto Women University started working while private sector IQRA National University was also established in 2012.

Apart from excellent range of universities, Peshawar district also has huge numbers of further education (Post School) institutes both in public and private sectors. The most renowned are Islamia College Peshawar, which was established in 1913 and was upgraded to become university in 2008 and Edwardes College Peshawar, which is the oldest of all institutions in the district started functioning in 1900.

=== State of Education in Peshawar ===
According to Pakistan District Education Rankings 2017 published by Alif Ailaan, Peshawar ranks 4th in Pakistan in terms of primary school infrastructure while it ranks 52nd in Pakistan for middle school infrastructure. In terms of education score, Peshawar ranks 64th in Pakistan with having a relatively low retention score. Beyond Primary Readiness in Peshawar is on the lower side as it ranks 62nd in Pakistan.

The main issues reported in Taleem Do! App for district Peshawar are overcrowded class rooms and lack of class rooms in schools.

Girls’ education is also one of the most reported issues in the app, with main focus on lesser number of Girls schools and also schools located at long distances.

Issues of lack of teachers, non availability of science labs and lack of High Schools were also reported.

Issues regarding the high fee collections in private schools was also reported on multiple occasions.

== See also ==
- Union Councils of District Peshawar
- Districts of Pakistan
  - Districts of Khyber Pakhtunkhwa
- Tehsils of Pakistan
  - Tehsils of Khyber Pakhtunkhwa
- Divisions of Pakistan
  - Divisions of Khyber Pakhtunkhwa

== Bibliography ==
- 1981 District census report of Peshawar. Vol. 26. Islamabad: Population Census Organization, Statistics Division, Government of Pakistan. 1983. p. 86.
- 1998 District census report of Charsadda. Census publication. Vol. 68. Islamabad: Population Census Organization, Statistics Division, Government of Pakistan. 2000.
- 1998 District census report of Nowshera. Census publication. Vol. 55. Islamabad: Population Census Organization, Statistics Division, Government of Pakistan. 1999.
- 1998 District census report of Peshawar. Census publication. Vol. 33. Islamabad: Population Census Organization, Statistics Division, Government of Pakistan. 1999.
