= Adezai =

Adezai آدیزئی
- Union Council
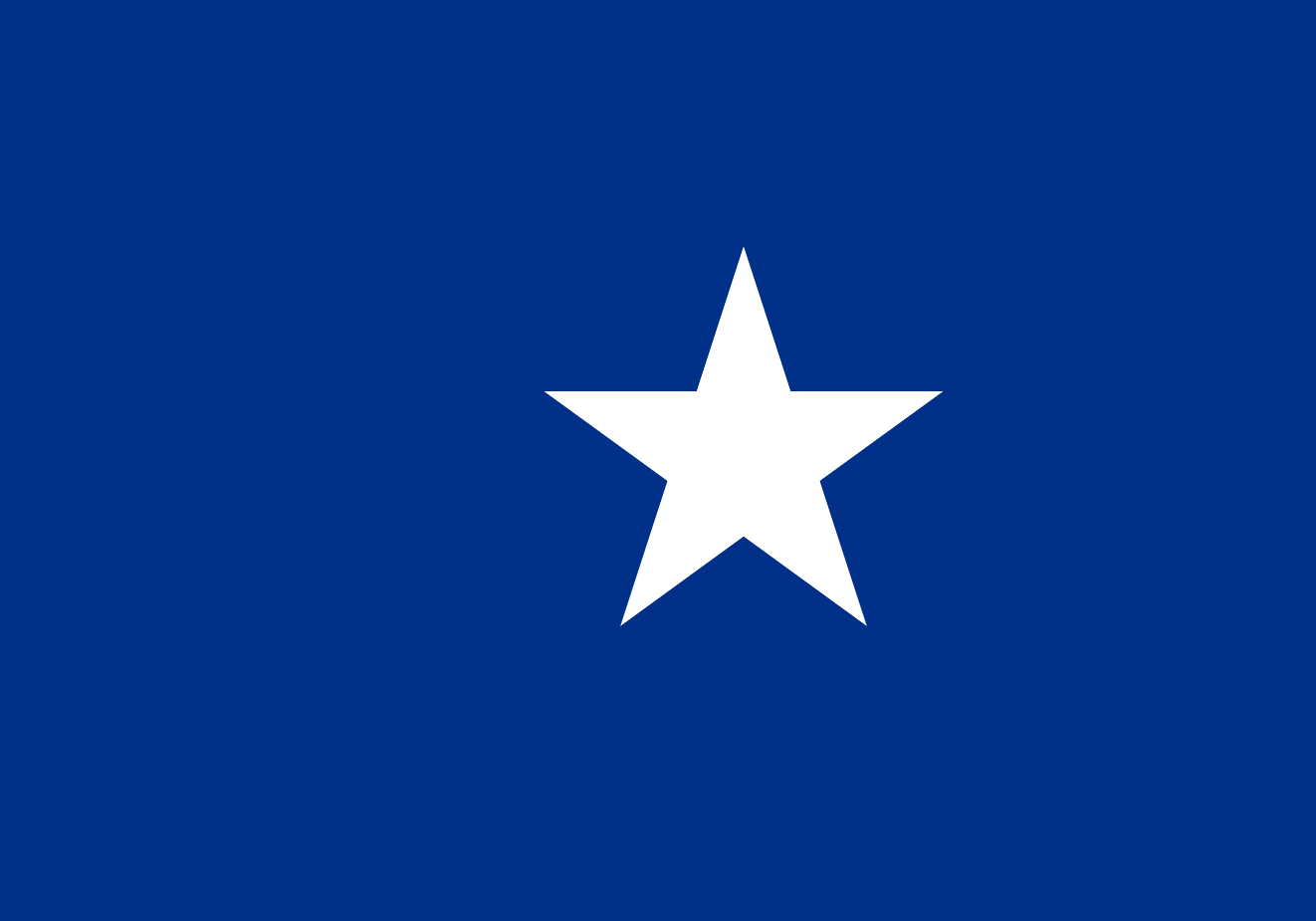
- Flag

- Location within Pakistan
- Coordinates: 33°47′20.58″N 71°34′37.20″E
- Country: Pakistan
- Province: Khyber Pakhtunkhwa
- District: Peshawar District
- Tehsil: Peshawar Tehsil

Government
- Time zone: UTC+5 (PST)

Adezai or Addezai (Pashto: آديزئي) is a town in the Peshawar District of Pakistan's Khyber Pakhtunkhwa province. It is situated about 33 kilometres (21 mi) by road south of the city of Peshawar, and is the administrative center of Adezai Union Council. The N55 road partly connects it to Peshawar in the north and Kohat via Dara Adam Khel to the south.

== Landmarks ==
The town contains mosques such as Bilal-e-Habashi Mosque, Masjid Fateh Khel, and Masjid Mirzakhel. The Adezai Government Higher Secondary School is situated along the main road. Danveer Karan playground is located off the main road in the southeastern part of the town.

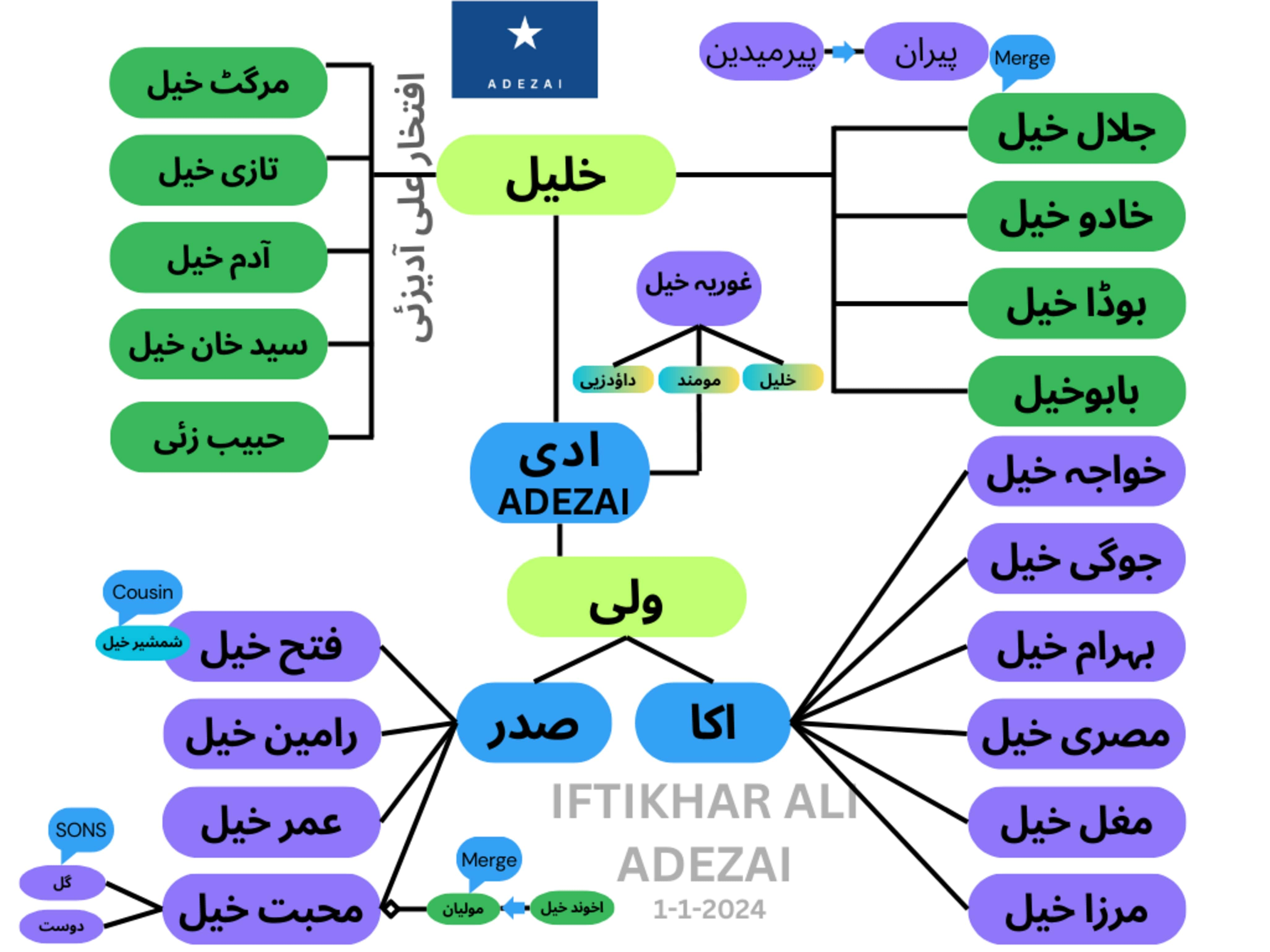
adezai family tree
