= Indus Kohistani people =

Indo-Aryan ethnolinguistic group in northern Pakistan

Indus Kohistanis
كْستٓى
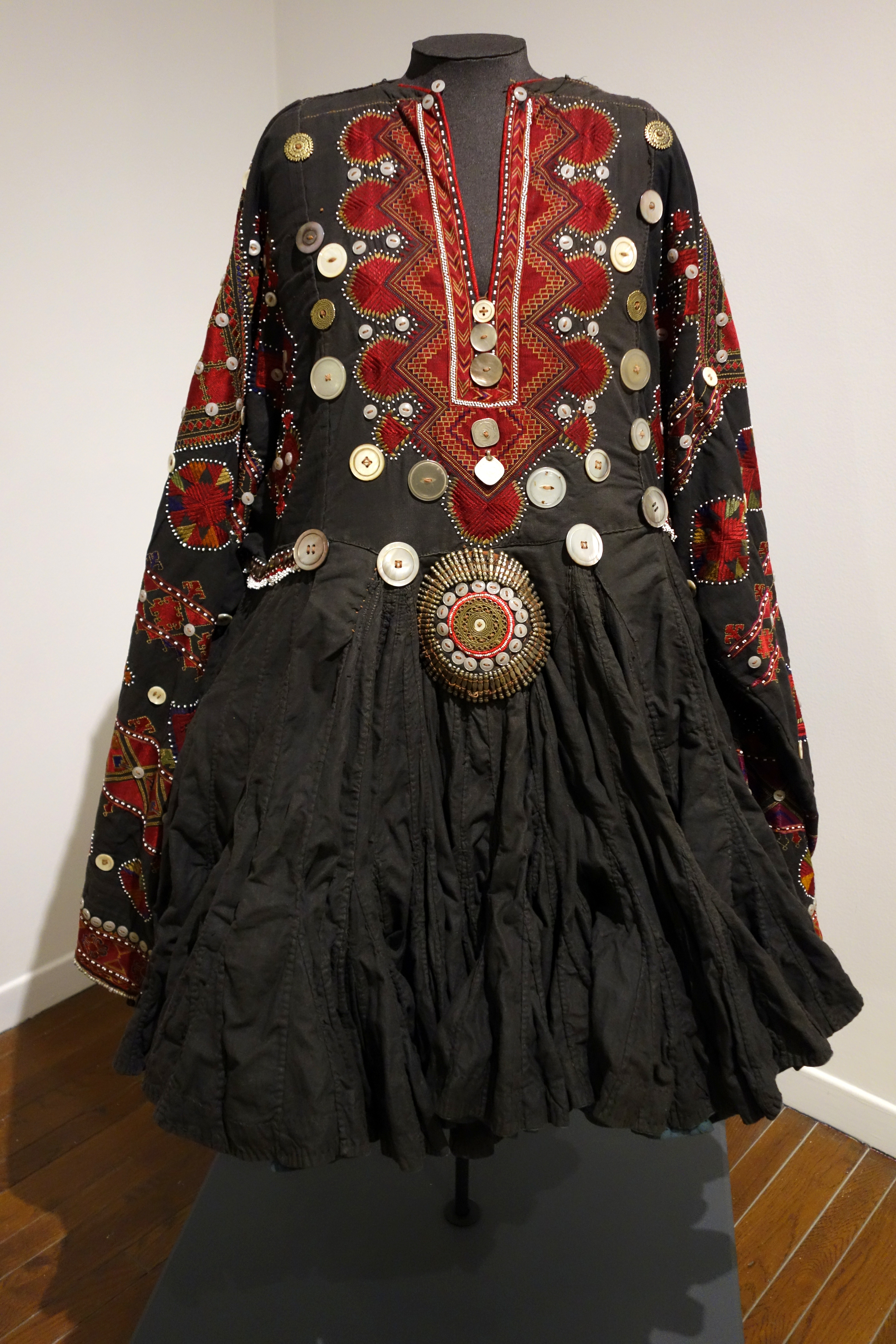
- Kohistani jumlo, traditionally worn by women on weddings

Total population
- Approx. 200,000 (1992)

Regions with significant populations
- Indus Kohistan

Languages
- Indus Kohistani

Religion
- Islam

Related ethnic groups
- Other Indo-Aryan peoples, especially other Kohistani peoples

Indus Kohistanis are an Indo-Aryan ethnolinguistic group speaking the Indus Kohistani language. They mainly reside in Indus Kohistan, Hazara Division in northern Pakistan.

== History ==
Kohistan is home to several ethnic groups Inhabiting the region of Indus Kohistan, Hazara Division. The Kohistani's like their neighbours in the Hazara Division formerly practised Hinduism and Buddhism, until the 15th century, when the Hazarewals started converting to Islam. A Glossary of the Tribes and Castes of the Punjab and North-West Frontier Province thus notes that their neighbours, "The Pathans call them, and all Muhammadis (صلى الله عليه وسلم) of Indian descent in the Hindu Kush valleys, Kohistanis."

During the winter, the Kohistani people reside near their fields, while in the summer they migrate to camping grounds that are located 14,000 feet in altitude.
