= Gowro language =

Indo-Aryan language of Pakistan

Gowro
- Native to: Pakistan
- Region: Kohistan, Khyber Pakhtunkhwa
- Native speakers: 346 (2019)
- Language family: Indo-European: Indo-Iranian; Indo-Aryan; Dardic; Kohistani; Gowro

Language codes
- ISO 639-3: gwf
- Glottolog: gowr1239
- ELP: Gowro

Gowro, also known as Gabaro, is an Indo-Aryan language spoken in Kohistan District, Pakistan.
