= Rambani dialect =

Dialect of Sirazi

Rambani
- Native to: Jammu and Kashmir
- Region: Doda district
- Language family: Indo-European: Indo-Iranian; Indo-Aryan; Western Pahari; Sarazi; Rambani

Language codes
- ISO 639-3: None (mis)
- Glottolog: ramb1240

Rambani is a variety of Sarazi spoken in Ramban district, which is located in the mountainous parts of the Jammu region of Jammu and Kashmir, India.

In P.K. Kaul's view, Rambani belongs to the Sirjazic group of Western Pahari, and has been influenced by languages like Kashmiri, Poguli and Dogri.

Rambani is likely an endangered dialect. It is spoken by relatively few people, but the exact number of speakers is unknown. In the 1981 census, there were only 120 people who identified their mother tongue as Rambani, but this number is not reliable given that in the area there were sizeable census returns for "Pahari", a much broader term that could conceivably have been chosen by some speakers of Rambani.

Grammar sketches of Rambani are found in T. Grahame Bailey's 1908 The Languages of the Northern Himalayas and in G.A. Grierson's Linguistic Survey of India.

== Bibliography ==
- Kaul, Pritam Krishen (2006). Pahāṛi and Other Tribal Dialects of Jammu. Vol. 1. Delhi: Eastern Book Linkers. ISBN 8178541017.
