= Wotapuri-Katarqalai language =

Endangered or extinct Indo-Aryan language of Afghanistan

Wotapuri-Katarqalai
- Native to: Afghanistan
- Region: Watapur District
- Native speakers: 3 (2023)
- Language family: Indo-European: Indo-Iranian; Indo-Aryan; Dardic; Wotapuri-Katarqalai
- Dialects: Wotapuri; Katarqalai

Language codes
- ISO 639-3: wsv
- Glottolog: wota1240
- ELP: Wotapuri-Katarqalai
- Wotapuri-Katarqalai is classified as Definitely Endangered by the UNESCO Atlas of the World's Languages in Danger

Wotapuri-Katarqalai is a Dardic Indo-Aryan language documented to have been spoken in Afghanistan. It is unknown if the language still has active speakers, or is extinct. The most recent documentation of its use was published in 1983, when it was proposed that the language was in use in Katar-qala and unlikely to be extinct in Wotapur. In September 2023, there were just 3 senior male speakers (1 in Katar-qala and 2 in Quro) living in the valley reported to Sviatoslav Kaverin who was conducting field research there.

== Phonology ==
Below is set out the phonology of the Wotapuri-Katarqalai language.

=== Vowels ===
	Front	Central	Back
Close	i iː		u uː
Mid	e eː	ə	o oː
Open		a aː	

=== Consonants ===
		Labial	Coronal	Retroflex	Palatal	Velar	Uvular	Glottal
Nasal		m	n	ɳ				
Stop	Plain	p	t	ʈ		k	q	
Stop	Aspirated	pʰ [f]	tʰ	ʈʰ		kʰ		
Stop	Voiced	b	d	ɖ		ɡ		
Affricate	Plain		ts	tʂ	tʃ			
Affricate	Aspirated		tsʰ	tʂʰ	tʃʰ			
Affricate	Voiced		(dz)		dʒ			
Fricative	Plain		s	ʂ	ʃ	x		h
Fricative	Voiced		z					
Lateral	Plain		l					
Lateral	Fricative		ɬ ~ l̥					
Rhotic			r	ɽ				
Semivowel					j	w		
