= Bateri language =

Indo-Aryan language spoken in South Asia

Bateri
- بٹیری, बटेरी Baṭerī; Bhaṭʹe-sa zʹib
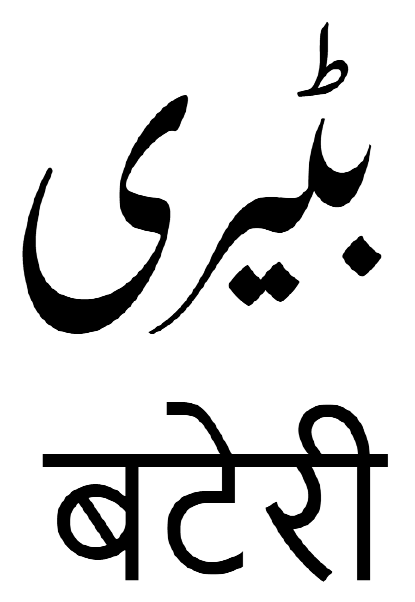
- Native to: Pakistan, India
- Region: Kohistan, Jammu and Kashmir
- Native speakers: (29,000 (28,300 in Pakistan, 700 in India). cited 2000)
- Language family: Indo-European: Indo-Iranian; Indo-Aryan; Dardic; Kohistani; Bateri
- Writing system: Devanagari (India), Arabic script (Pakistan)

Language codes
- ISO 639-3: btv
- Glottolog: bate1261
- ELP: Bateri

Bateri (بٹیری, बटेरी) is an Indo-Aryan language spoken mostly in Kohistan District, Pakistan and to a much lesser extent in Jammu and Kashmir, India.

== Status ==
As of now, there is little research done on the language and is currently being studied and surveyed by organizations like FLI (Forum for Language Initiatives), a Pakistani linguistic resource center based in Islamabad. The language is currently unwritten however may finally have one in the near future.
