= Kohistan District, Pakistan =

Indus Kohistan کوہستان
- District
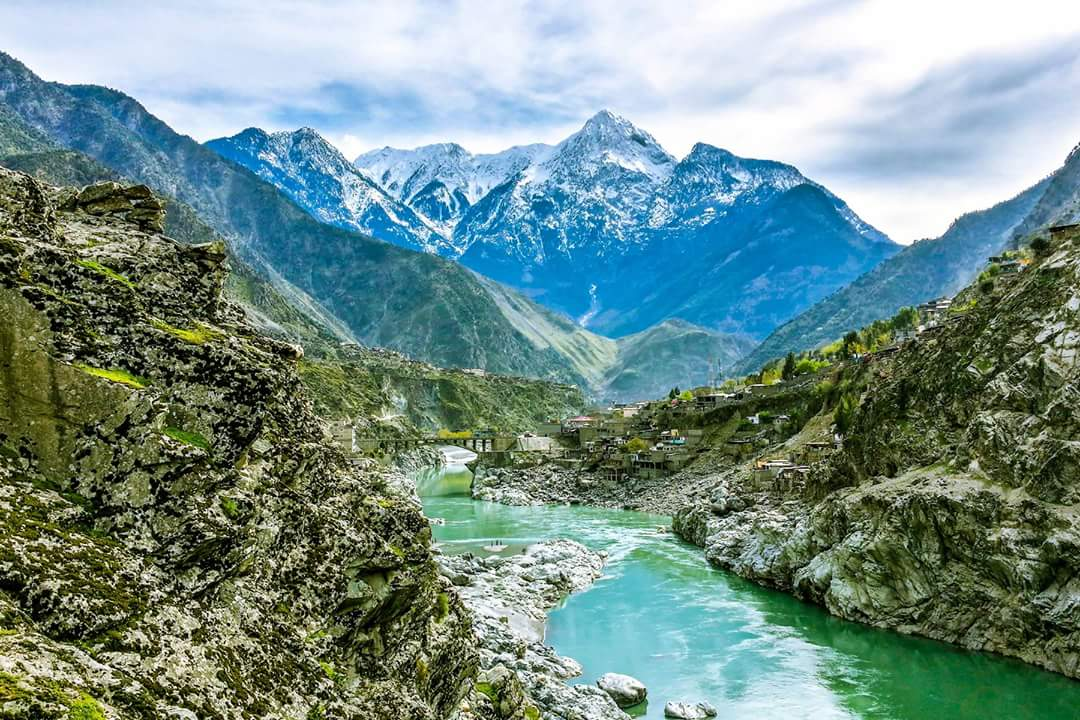

- Location of the former Kohistan District (highlighted in red) in Pakistan
- Coordinates: 35°15′N 73°30′E
- Country: Pakistan
- Province: Khyber Pakhtunkhwa
- Division: Hazara
- Established: 1 October 1976-2014
- Headquarters: Dasu

Area
  - Total: 7,492 km^{2} (2,893 sq mi)

Population (2017)
  - Total: 784,711
  - Density: 104.7/km^{2} (271.3/sq mi)
- Time zone: UTC+5 (PST)

Kohistan District (Urdu: کوہستان) was a district within the Hazara Division of Khyber Pakhtunkhwa, Pakistan. Consisting of the eastern portion of the larger Kohistan region, it was bifurcated into two districts in 2014: Upper Kohistan and Lower Kohistan. In 2017, the Lower Kohistan District was further bifurcated and a district Kolai-Palas was established. It has an area of 7,492 square kilometres (2,893 sq mi) and a population of 472,570 according to the 1998 Census.

Geographically, Kohistan stretched from Gilgit-Baltistan in the north to the Mansehra District in the east to the Battagram District and Shangla and Swat districts in the west.

== History ==
The Kohistan region is mainly inhabited by the speakers of Dardic languages, commonly known as Kohistani people. Until 1 May 1934 Indus Kohistan was included in the Gilgit Agency, when its control was transferred to the North Western Frontier Province. However, its area continued to be counted in the total area of the princely state of Jammu and Kashmir. After independence, Indus Kohistan became part of NWFP, and after it was renamed, Khyber Pakhtunkhwa province.

== Geography ==
The district lies between 34° 54′ and 35° 52′ north latitudes and 72° 43′ and 73° 57′ east longitudes. It was bounded by the Diamer District of Gilgit-Baltistan in the north, Manshera District in the southeast, Kaghan Valley of the Mansehra District in the southeast, Battagram District in the south and Shangla and Swat Districts in the west .

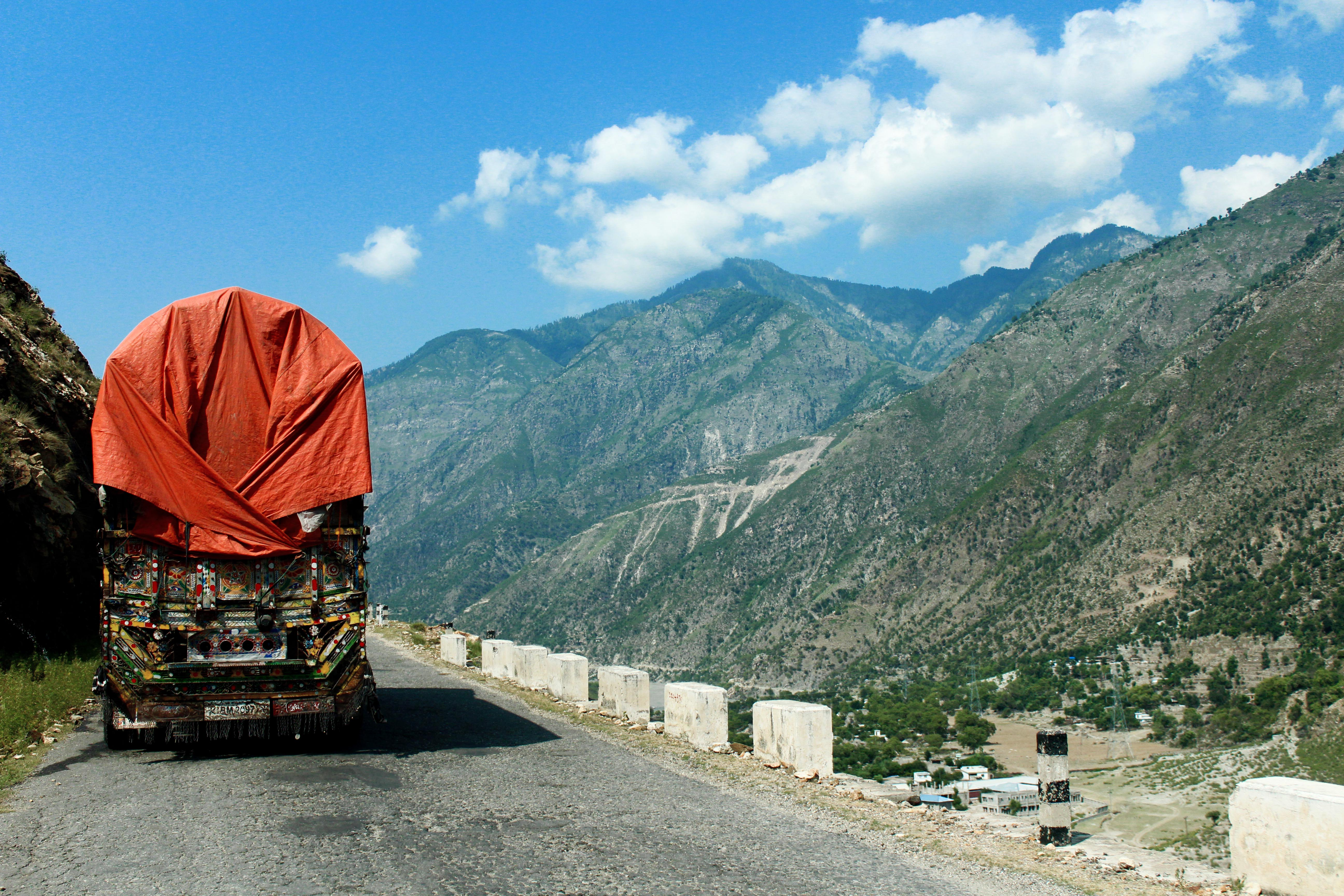
Kohistan is noted for its dramatic mountain scenery.

Kohistan is the point of convergence for the Hindukush, Karakorum, and Himalayan mountain ranges, acting as a natural boundary delineating distinct environmental regions within the expanse of the Himalayas, Karakoram, and Hindu Kush mountain chains. This uniqueness of the mountain system also results in rich flora and fauna, thus providing a habitat for unique species such as the Western Tragopan pheasant and the snow leopard.

== Education ==
The literacy rate of the district among the population aged 10 years and older is 11.1%: male 17.23% and female 2.95%. The proportion of the working or employed population to the population aged 10 years and older is 26.47%, which is 70.53% of the total labour force. Out of the total employed population, 71.60% are self-employed, 10.68% work as employees, and 17.32% are unpaid family helpers.

Kohistan's literacy rate is among the lowest in Pakistan and hovers around 20%. It has the lowest Human Development Index of all districts in Khyber Pakhtunkhwa.

== Demographics ==
Historical population
Year	Pop.	±% p.a.
1951	18,775	—
1961	54,452	+11.24%
1972	84,826	+4.11%
1981	147,635	+6.35%
1998	280,666	+3.85%
2017	784,711	+5.56%

At the time of the 2017 census the district had a population of 784,711, of which 424,643 were males and 360,055 females. The rural population was 706,433 (97.95%) while the urban population was 72,654 (2.05%). The literacy rate was 76.20% - the male literacy rate was 86.40% while the female literacy rate was 65.76%. 3,172 (0.24%) people in the district were from religious minorities, mainly Christians.

=== Languages ===
The major language of the area is named Kohistani, which in the 1981 census, was the mother tongue of 92% of households. However the designation is applied to different unrelated languages, including the Kohistani Shina (a Shina dialect), mainly spoken in the eastern side of the Indus River encompassing eastern Upper Kohistan and Kolai-Palas, and Indus Kohistani, mainly spoken in the western side of the Indus River encompassing western Upper Kohistan and Lower Kohistan.

== See also ==
- Upper Kohistan District
- Lower Kohistan District
- Kolai-Palas District
