= Dardic languages =

Subgroup of Indo-Aryan languages

Dardic
- Hindu-Kush Indo-Aryan
- (geographical)
- Geographic distribution: Northern Pakistan (Gilgit-Baltistan, northern Khyber Pakhtunkhwa, Azad Kashmir); Northwestern India (Jammu and Kashmir, Ladakh); Northeastern Afghanistan (Kapisa, Kunar, Laghman, Nangarhar, Nuristan)
- Linguistic classification: Indo-European: Indo-Iranian; Indo-Aryan; Dardic
- Subdivisions: Kashmiri; Shina; Kohistani; Chitral; Pashai; Kunar

Language codes
- Glottolog: None dard1244 Eastern Dardic
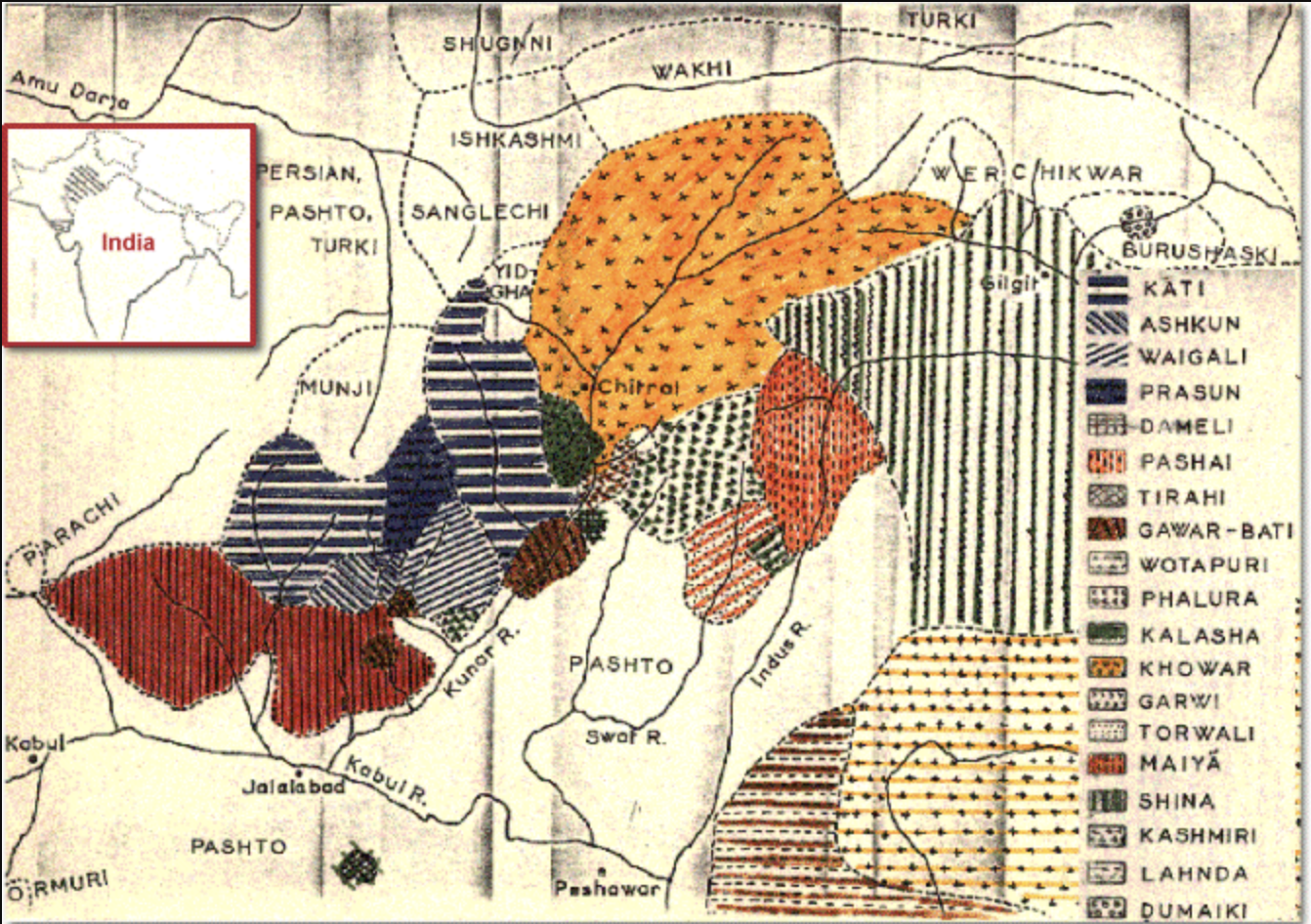
- Dardic languages by Georg Morgenstierne (Note: Nuristani languages such as Kamkata-vari (Kati), Kalasha-ala (Waigali), etc. are now separated)

The Dardic languages (also Dardu or Pisaca), also known as Hindu-Kush Indo-Aryan languages, is an areal group of several northwestern Indo-Aryan languages spoken in northern Pakistan, northwestern India and northeastern Afghanistan. Rather than close linguistic or ethnic relationships, the term Dardic is a geographical concept, denoting the northwesternmost group of Indo-Aryan languages.

The region where Dardic languages are spoken has sometimes been referred to as Dardistan. There is no ethnic unity among the speakers of these languages, nor can the languages be traced to a single ancestor. The extinct Gandhari language, spoken in the ancient Gandhara, was Dardic in nature. Linguistic evidence has linked Gandhari with some living Dardic languages, particularly Torwali and other Kohistani languages.

== History ==
Leitner's Dardistan, in its broadest sense, became the basis for the classification of the languages in the north-west of the Indo-Aryan linguistic area (which includes present-day eastern Afghanistan, northern Pakistan, and Kashmir). George Abraham Grierson, with scant data, borrowed the term and proposed an independent Dardic family within the Indo-Iranian languages. However, Grierson's formulation of Dardic is now considered to be incorrect in its details, and has therefore been rendered obsolete by modern scholarship.

Georg Morgenstierne, who conducted an extensive fieldwork in the region during the early 20th century, revised Grierson's classification and came to the view that only the "Kafiri" (Nuristani) languages formed an independent branch of the Indo-Iranian languages separate from Indo-Aryan and Iranian families, and determined that the Dardic languages were unmistakably Indo-Aryan in character.

Dardic languages contain absolutely no features which cannot be derived from old [Indo-Aryan language]. They have simply retained a number of striking archasisms, which had already disappeared in most Prakrit dialects... There is not a single common feature distinguishing Dardic, as a whole, from the rest of the [Indo-Aryan] languages... Dardic is simply a convenient term to denote a bundle of aberrant [Indo-Aryan] hill-languages which, in their relative isolation, accented in many cases by the invasion of Pathan tribes, have been in varying degrees sheltered against the expand influence of [Indo-Aryan] Midland (Madhyadesha) innovations, being left free to develop on their own.

Due to their geographic isolation, many Dardic languages have preserved archaisms and other features of Old Indo-Aryan. These features include three sibilants, several types of clusters of consonants, and archaic or antiquated vocabulary lost in other modern Indo-Aryan languages. Kalasha and Khowar are the most archaic of all modern Indo-Aryan languages, retaining a great part of Sanskrit case inflexion, and retaining many words in a nearly Sanskritic form. For example driga "long" in Kalasha is nearly identical to dīrghá in Sanskrit and ašrú "tear" in Khowar is identical to the Sanskrit word.

French Indologist Gérard Fussman points out that the term Dardic is geographic, not a linguistic expression. Taken literally, it allows one to believe that all the languages spoken in Dardistan are Dardic. It also allows one to believe that all the people speaking Dardic languages are Dards and the area they live in is Dardistan. A term used by classical geographers to identify the area inhabited by an indefinite people, and used in Rajatarangini in reference to people outside Kashmir, has come to have ethnographic, geographic, and even political significance today.

== Classification ==
Georg Morgenstierne's scheme corresponds to recent scholarly consensus. As such, the historic Dardic languages' position as a legitimate genetic subfamily has been repeatedly called into question; it is widely acknowledged that the grouping is more geographical in nature, as opposed to linguistic. Richard Strand has argued that the term should be abandoned, citing both the lack of justification for a distinct Dardic subgroup and the problematic history of the label, and instead proposes classifying the languages directly into smaller genealogical groups within Indo-Aryan. Mock has similarly voiced doubts in this regard.

In response to the ambiguity of the term, several alternative geographical labels have also been proposed to replace Dardic. Henrik Liljegren has used Hindu-Kush Indo-Aryan, while Richard Strand has proposed the term Far-Northwestern Indo-Aryan. Both terms are increasingly used in recent scholarship as replacements for Dardic.

However, Anton Kogan has suggested an 'East-Dardic' sub-family; comprising the 'Kashmiri', 'Kohistani' and 'Shina' groups.

Scholars have differed in their assessment of the internal subgrouping of the languages traditionally labelled Dardic. Some proposed groupings appear comparatively stable, while others have been substantially revised or remain uncertain. Buddruss removed Domaki from the 'Shina' group entirely, and identified it as belonging to Central Indo-Aryan. Rambani and Sarazi have likewise been excluded from Kashmiri and classified under Western Pahari. The 'Chitrali', 'Kashmiri' and 'Pashai' are often treated as especially cohesive; by contrast, 'Kohistani' is frequently viewed as a looser regional grouping, and some quantitative analyses do not separate Kohistani' and 'Shina' cleanly.

While it is true that many Dardic languages have been influenced by non-Dardic languages, Dardic may have also influenced neighbouring Indo-Aryan lects in turn, such as Punjabi, the Pahari languages, including the Central Pahari languages of Uttarakhand, and purportedly even further afield. Some linguists have posited that Dardic lects may have originally been spoken throughout a much larger region, stretching from the mouth of the Indus (in Sindh) northwards in an arc, and then eastwards through modern day Himachal Pradesh to Kumaon. However, this has not been conclusively established.

== Subdivisions ==
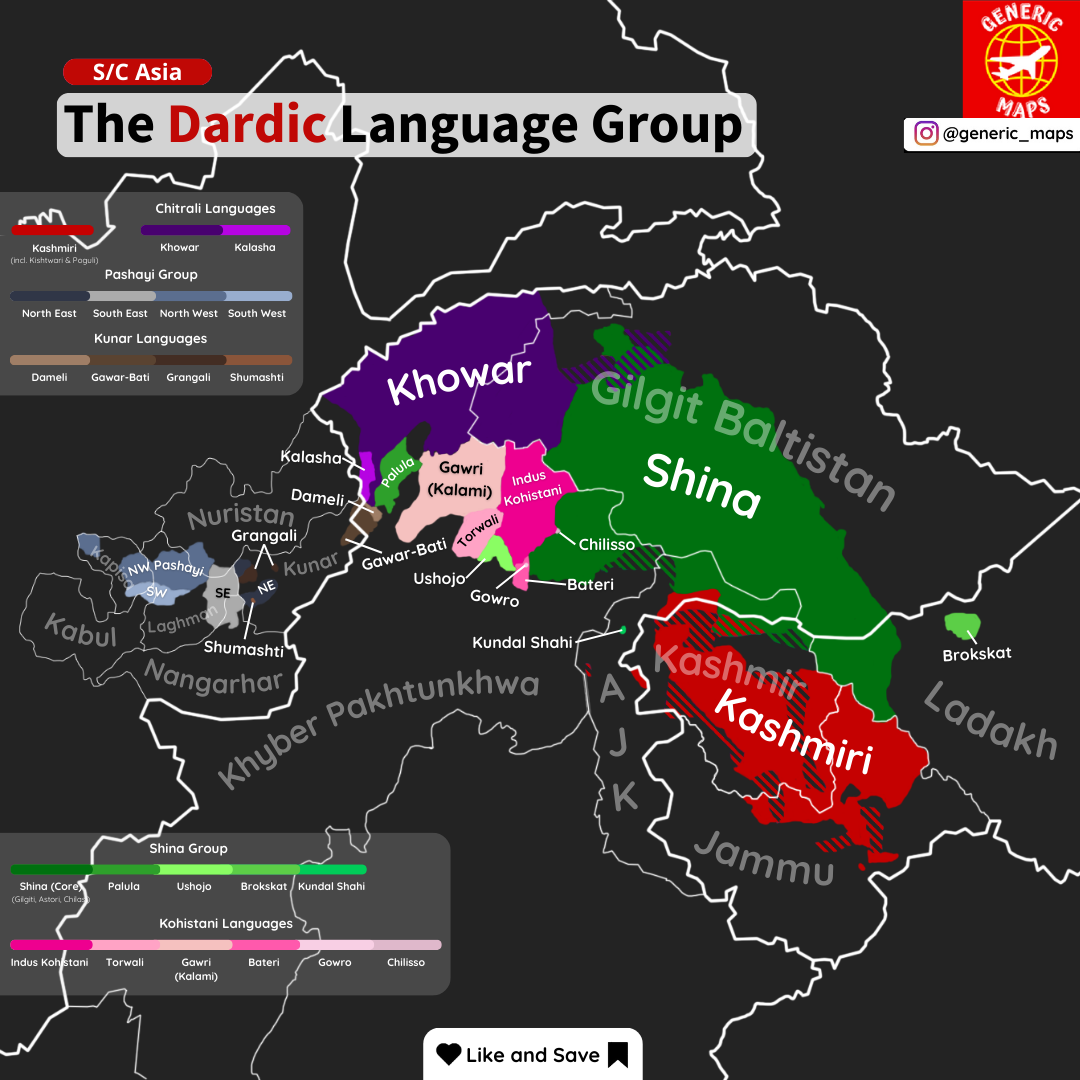
Map showcasing the areas where each Dardic language is spoken

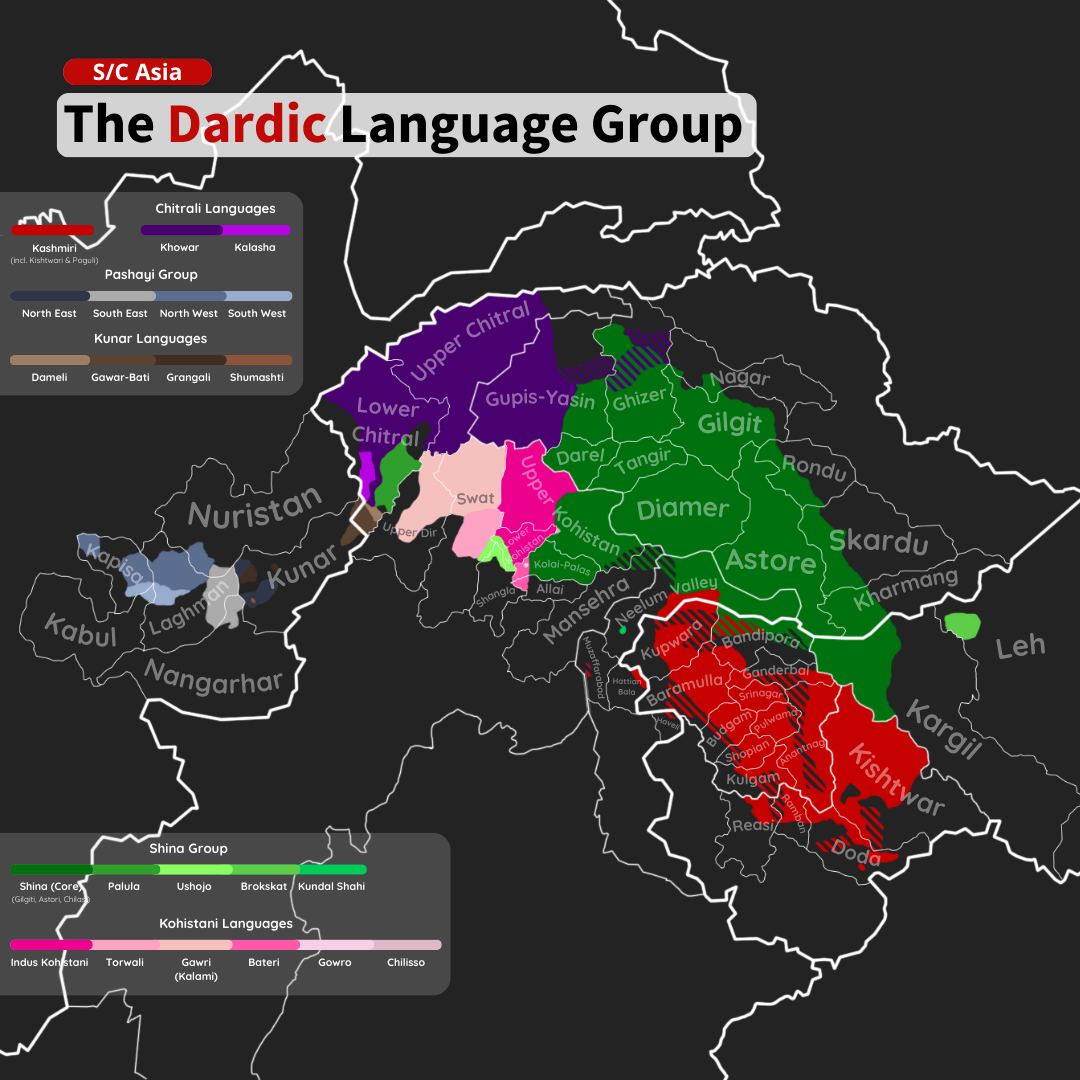
Map showcasing the areas where each Dardic language is spoken, with subdivisions visible

Dardic languages have been organized into the following subfamilies:

- Kashmiri languages: Kashmiri, Poguli, Kishtwari
- Shina languages: Shina, Brokskad, Kalkoti, Kohistani Shina, Kundal Shahi, Palula, Savi, Ushoji
- Kohistani languages: Maiya (Indus Kohistani), Bateri, Chilisso, Gawri, Gawro, Torwali, Mankiyali, Wotapuri-Katarqalai, Tirahi
- Chitrali languages: Kalasha (Urtsuniwar), Khowar
- Pashai languages
- Kunar languages: Dameli, Gawar-Bati, Nangalami (Grangali), Shumashti

== Characteristics ==
=== Loss of voiced aspiration ===
Virtually all Dardic languages have experienced a partial or complete loss of voiced aspirated consonants. Khowar uses the word buum for 'earth' (Sanskrit: bhumi),^{1} Pashai uses the word duum for 'smoke' (Urdu: dhuān, Sanskrit: dhūma) and Kashmiri uses the word dọd for 'milk' (Sanskrit: dugdha, Urdu: dūdh). Tonality has developed in most (but not all) Dardic languages, such as Khowar and Pashai, as a compensation. Punjabi and Western Pahari languages similarly lost aspiration but have virtually all developed tonality to partially compensate (e.g. Punjabi kàr for 'house', compare with Hindustani ghar).

=== Dardic metathesis and other changes ===
Both ancient and modern Dardic languages demonstrate a marked tendency towards metathesis where a "pre- or postconsonantal 'r' is shifted forward to a preceding syllable". This was seen in Ashokan rock edicts (erected 269 BCE to 231 BCE) in the Gandhara region, where Dardic dialects were and still are widespread. Examples include a tendency to spell the Classical Sanskrit words priyadarshi (one of the titles of Emperor Ashoka) as instead priyadrashi and dharma as dhrama. Modern-day Kalasha uses the word driga 'long' (Sanskrit: dirgha). Palula uses drubalu 'weak' (Sanskrit: durbala) and brhuj 'birch tree' (Sanskrit: bhurja). Kashmiri uses drạ̄lid^{2} 'impoverished' (Sanskrit: daridra) and krama 'work' or 'action' (Sanskrit: karma). Western Pahari languages (such as Dogri), Sindhi and Punjabi also share this Dardic tendency to metathesis, though they are considered non-Dardic, for example the Punjabi word 'prakaramā' vs Sanskrit 'parikramā' and the Punjabi word drakhat 'tree' (from Persian darakht).

Dardic languages also show other consonantal changes. Kashmiri, for instance, has a marked tendency to shift k to ch and j to z (e.g. zon 'person' is cognate to Sanskrit jan 'person or living being' and Persian jān 'life').

=== Verb position in Dardic ===
Unique among the Dardic languages, Kashmiri presents "verb second" as the normal grammatical form. This is similar to many Germanic languages, such as German and Dutch, as well as Uto-Aztecan O'odham and Northeast Caucasian Ingush. All other Dardic languages, and more generally within Indo-Iranian, follow the subject-object-verb (SOV) pattern.

Language	First example sentence	Second example sentence
English (Germanic)	This is a horse.	We will go to Tokyo.
Kashmiri (Dardic)	Yi chu akh gur.	Ạs' gatshav Tokiyo.
Katë (Nuristani)	Ina ušpa âsa.	Imo Tokyo âćamo.
Pashto (Iranian)	Masculine: Dā yaw as day. / Feminine: Dā yawa aspa da.	Mūng/Mūẓ̌ ba Ṭokyo ta/tar lāṛšū.
Dari (Iranian)	In yak asb ast.	Mâ ba Tokyo xâhem raft.
Shina (Dardic)	Anu ek aspo han.	Be Tokyo et bujun.
Brokskat (Dardic)	Homo ek apʂak bait.	Ba Tokyo ray "byénaings".
Indus Kohistani (Dardic)	Shu ek gho thu.	Be Tokyo ye bay-tho.
Sindhi (Indo-Aryan)	Heeu hiku ghoro aahe.	Asaan Tokyo veendaaseen.
Hindi-Urdu (Indo-Aryan)	Ye ek ghoṛa hain.^{4}	Ham Tokyo jāenge.
Punjabi (Indo-Aryan)	É (iha) ikk kòṛa ài.	Asĩ Tokyo jāvange.
Rajasthani (Indo-Aryan)	Aa eak ghoro chhe.	Aapan Tokyo javshyan.
Mandeali (Indo-Aryan)	Ye ek ghōṛā hā.	Āsā Tokyo jāṇā.
Nepali (Indo-Aryan)	Yo euta ghoda ho.	Hami Tokyo jānechhaũ.
Garhwali (Indo-Aryan)	Yuu ek ghoda cha.	Ham Tokyo Jaula.
Kumaoni (Indo-Aryan)	Yo ek ghwad chhu.	Ham Tokyo jaunl.
Khowar (Dardic language)	Haya ei istore.	Ispa Tokyo ote besi.

== See also ==
- Nuristani languages

== Notes ==
1.The Khowar word for 'earth' is more accurately represented, with tonality, as buúm rather than buum, where ú indicates a rising tone.
2.The word drolid actually includes a Kashmiri half-vowel, which is difficult to render in the Urdu, Devnagri and Roman scripts alike. Sometimes, an umlaut is used when it occurs in conjunction with a vowel, so the word might be more accurately rendered as drölid.
3.Sandhi rules in Sanskrit allow the combination of multiple neighboring words together into a single word: for instance, word-final aḥ plus word-initial a merge into o. In actual Sanskrit literature, with the effects of sandhi, this sentence would be expected to appear as Eṣá ékóśvósti. Also, word-final a is Sanskrit is a schwa, [ə] (similar to the ending 'e' in the German name, Nietzsche), so e.g. the second word is pronounced [éːkə]. Pitch accent is indicated with an acute accent in the case of the older Vedic language, which was inherited from Proto-Indo-European.
4.Hindi-Urdu, and other non-Dardic Indo-Aryan languages, also sometimes utilize a "verb second" order (similar to Kashmiri and English) for dramatic effect. Yeh ek ghoṛā hain is the normal conversational form in Hindi-Urdu. Yeh hain ek ghoṛā is also grammatically correct but indicates a dramatic revelation or other surprise. This dramatic form is often used in news headlines in Hindi-Urdu, Punjabi and other Indo-Aryan languages.

== Sources ==
Academic literature from outside South Asia

- Morgenstierne, G. Irano-Dardica. Wiesbaden 1973;
- Morgenstierne, G. Die Stellung der Kafirsprachen. In Irano-Dardica, 327-343. Wiesbaden, Reichert 1975
- Decker, Kendall D. Sociolinguistic Survey of Northern Pakistan, Volume 5. Languages of Chitral.

Academic literature from South Asia

- The Comparative study of Urdu and Khowar. Badshah Munir Bukhari National Language Authority Pakistan 2003. [No Reference]
- National Institute of Pakistani Studies, Quaid-i-Azam University & Summer Institute of Linguistics

== Bibliography ==
- Koul, Omkar N. (2008), "Dardic Languages", in Vennelakanti Prakāśam (ed.), Encyclopaedia of the Linguistic Sciences: Issues and Theories, Allied Publishers, pp. 142–147, ISBN 978-81-8424-279-9
- Masica, Colin P. (1993), The Indo-Aryan Languages, Cambridge University Press, ISBN 978-0-521-29944-2
