= Georg Morgenstierne =

Norwegian linguist (1892–1978)

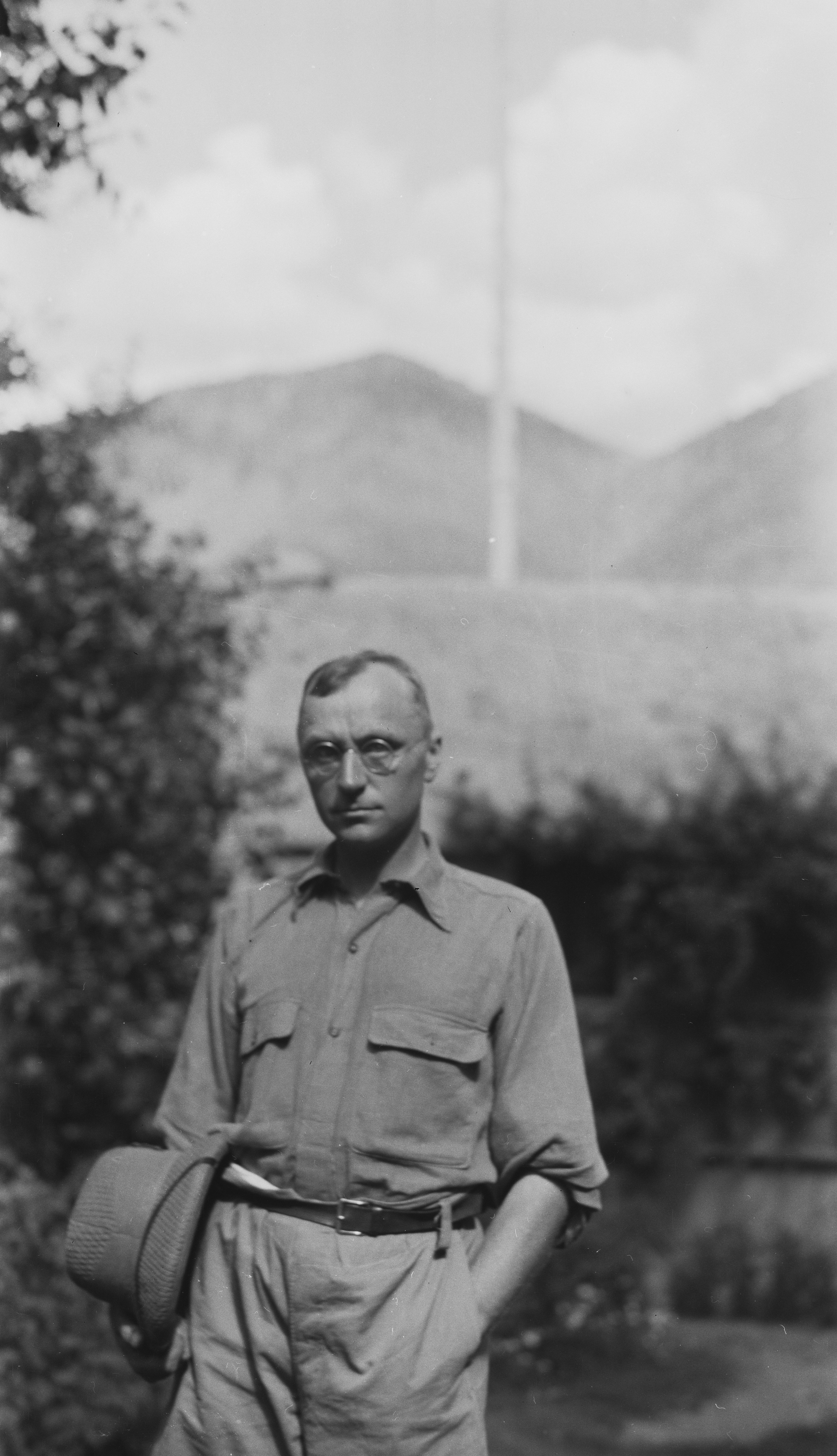
- Born: Georg Valentin von Munthe af Morgenstierne; 2 January 1892; Oslo, Norway
- Died: 3 March 1978 (aged 86); Oslo, Norway

Philosophical work
- Era: 20th century
- Region: Afghanistan, Pakistan, India and Iran
- School: Descriptive linguistics
- Main interests: Indo-Iranian languages

Georg Valentin von Munthe af Morgenstierne (2 January 1892 – 3 March 1978) was a Norwegian professor of linguistics with the University of Oslo (UiO). He specialized in Indo-Iranian languages. In 1944, he was imprisoned as a hostage by Nazi occupation forces.

== Studies ==
During the years 1923 to 1971, Morgenstierne carried out fieldwork in Afghanistan, Pakistan, India and Iran. In 1924, he undertook the first of his two major linguistic expeditions. He arrived in Kabul with a personal letter of introduction to the King of Afghanistan, from the King of Norway. Together with studying the languages, Morgenstierne collected remarkable scientific materials from the culture of the regional people, like images, movies from pre-Islamic ceremonial dances and sound recordings from nearly extinct languages. The materials are available in his database at the National Library of Norway.

== Writings ==
- His publications listed in BIBSYS
- Report on a Linguistic Mission to Afghanistan. Instituttet for Sammenlignende Kulturforskning, Serie C I-2. Oslo. ISBN 0-923891-09-9
- Report on a Linguistic Mission to North-Western India by Georg Morgenstierne ISBN 0-923891-14-5
