= University of Lakki Marwat =

Public university in Pakistan

- Type: Public
- Established: 2017; 9 years ago
- Chancellor: Governor of Khyber Pakhtunkhwa
- Vice-Chancellor: Aurangzeb Khan
- Location: Lakki Marwat, Khyber Pakhtunkhwa, Pakistan
- Colours: Purple and Gold
- Nickname: ULM
- Website: Official Website

University of Lakki Marwat is a public sector university located at Lakki Marwat town of Khyber Pakhtunkhwa in Pakistan.

== Overview and history ==
University of Lakki Marwat is established by Government of Khyber Pakhtunwa in October 2017. It was originally a sub campus of University of Science and Technology Bannu and was established in 2014. The sub campus in Lakki Marwat was created by constant effort by the people of Lakki Marwat to have university in the district. The sub campus was created in Government Post Graduate College Lakki Marwat Campus. The campus initially offered research in 2 disciplines: Education & Research (IER) and Political Science. The Government of Khyber Pakhtunkhwa has upgraded the sub campus into full-fledged university in October 2017. Currently, different departments are temporarily operated from various branch campuses. The construction work on the main campus is underway at the location of Dalo Khel.

== Departments ==
University of Lakki Marwat has currently the following departments.

- Department of Political Science
- Department of Education and Research
- Department of Botany
- Department of Zoology
- Department of Mathematics
- Department of English literature
- Department of Chemistry
- Department of Computer Science
- Department of Physics

The University of Lakki Marwat offers PhD programmes in different science subjects as well.

== See also ==
- University of Science And Technology Bannu
- University of Science And Technology Kohat
- University of Science And Technology Abboattabad
- Gomal University Dera Ismail Khan
- Government Post Graduate College Lakki Marwat
