= Government Post Graduate College Lakki Marwat =

Government degree awarding college in Lakki Marwat, Pakistan

- Address: Lakki Marwat, Pakistan
- Type: Public Sector
- Established: 1963
- Location: Lakki Marwat, Pakistan
- Website: Official Website

Government Post Graduate College Lakki Marwat is public sector degree college located in Lakki Marwat town of Khyber Pakhtunkhwa in Pakistan. The college offers programs for intermediate level both in Arts and Science groups plus it also offers courses in 4 years BS degrees and 2 years Master degree courses in Statistics, Islamiyat and Computer Science for which it is affiliated with University of Science and Technology Bannu.

== Overview and history ==
Government Post Graduate College Lakki Marwat is one of the oldest colleges in Khyber Pakhtunkhwa. It was established in 1963 and initially started as Intermediate level college. It was upgraded to degree level in 1973. The college was moved to its current campus in 1994. It becomes Postgraduate degree college in 2003 and started Master level courses in Islamiyat, Computer Science and Statistics. In 2010-2011, the college started 4 years BS programs in Chemistry, Political Science and Physics.

In September 2014, the Government of Khyber Pakhtunkhwa has created sub campus of University of Science and Technology Bannu in the college. The campus is currently offering research in 2 disciplines: Education & Research (IER) and Political Science.

== Departments and faculties ==
The college has the following departments and faculties.

=== Faculty of Social Sciences ===
- Department of Economics
- Department of English Language & Literature
- Department of Geography
- Department of Health and Physical Education
- Department of History
- Department of Islamiat
- Department of Pak Studies
- Department of Political Science
- Department of Urdu Literature

=== Faculty of Biological Sciences ===
- Department of Botany
- Department of Zoology

=== Faculty of Physical Sciences ===
- Department of Chemistry
- Department of Computer Science
- Department of Mathematics
- Department of Statistics
- Department of Physics

== Programs ==
The college currently offers the following programs.

=== BS Degrees (4 years) ===
- BS Physics
- BS Chemistry
- BS Political Science
- BS mathematics
- BS Botany
- BS zoology

=== Master Degrees (2 years) ===
- MA Islamiyat
- MSc Statistics
- MSc Computer Science

=== Intermediate ===
- FSc – Pre-Medical (2 years)
- FSc – Pre-Engineering (2 years)
- FSc – Computer Science (2 years)
- FA – General Science (2 years)
- FA – Humanities (2 years)

== See also ==
- University of Lakki Marwat
- University of Science and Technology Bannu
- Khushal Khan Khattak University
- Government Post Graduate College Karak
- Government Post Graduate College Bannu
