= Government Post Graduate College Bannu =

Pakistani college

Coordinates: 32°58′48.6″N 70°35′48″E

- Address: Bannu, Pakistan
- Type: Public Sector
- Established: 1951
- Location: Bannu, Pakistan
- Website: Official Website

Government Post Graduate College Bannu is Government sector college located in Bannu town of Khyber Pakhtunkhwa in Pakistan. The college offers programs for intermediate level both in Arts and Science groups for which it is affiliated with Board of Intermediate and Secondary Education Bannu. The college also offers 2-year BA & BSc programs plus 4 years BS programs in various disciplines for which it is affiliated with University of Science and Technology Bannu.

== Overview and history ==
Government Post Graduate College Bannu started as Intermediate college in 1951. Initially it started classes only in Social Sciences (Arts). Science classes were started in 1954. In 1955, the college started degree level Social Sciences classes while in 1967, it started degree courses in Science.

In 1973, Postgraduate level degree classes were started in English, Botany, Chemistry and Economics. Political Science and Mathematics classes were started in 1980.

BS 4-Years degree programs were started in 2010–2011 in the subjects of Zoology, Physics, computer Science, Electronics, Economics, Political Science, Chemistry, Health and Physical Education, English, Botany, Mathematics and Pakistan Studies.

== Departments and faculties ==
The college has the following departments and faculties.

=== Faculty of Physical Sciences ===
- Department of Chemistry
- Department of Computer Science
- Department of Electronics
- Department of Mathematics
- Department of Statistics
- Department of Physics

=== Faculty of Biological Sciences ===
- Department of Botany
- Department of Zoology

=== Faculty of Social Sciences ===
- Department of Economics
- Department of English
- Department of Health and Physical Education
- Department of Islamiyat/Arabic
- Department of Pak Studies
- Department of Pashto
- Department of Political Science
- Department of Urdu

== Academic programs ==
The college currently offers the following programs.

=== Intermediate ===
- FSc – Pre-Medical (2 years)
- FSc – Pre-Engineering (2 years)
- FSc – Computer Science (2 years)
- FA – General Science (2 years)
- FA – Humanities (2 years)

=== Post graduate MA/MSc(2 years) ===
- MA English
- MSc Botany
- MSc Chemistry
- MA Economics
- MA Political Science
- MSc Mathematics

=== BS Degrees (4 years) ===
- BS Zoology
- BS Physics
- BS Computer Science
- BS Electronics
- BS Economics
- BS Political Science
- BS Chemistry
- BS Health and Physical Education
- BS English
- BS Botany
- BS Mathematics
- BS Pakistan Studies

== Notable alumni ==
- Baz Muhammad Khan, Former Member of the Senate of Pakistan
- Afrasiab Khattak, Former Member of the Senate of Pakistan
- Akram Khan Durrani, Former Member of the National Assembly of Pakistan
- Anwar Kamal Khan, Former Member of the Senate of Pakistan

== See also ==
- University of Science And Technology Bannu
- Khushal Khan Khattak University
- Government Post Graduate College Karak
- Government Post Graduate College Lakki Marwat
