= Khushal Khan Khattak University =

University in Pakistan

Coordinates: 33°12′30.1″N 71°14′57.1″E

Khushal Khan Khattak University, Karak
- Motto: زه به لار ورته پېدا کړم په هنر
- Motto in English: "Via art, i will create my way"
- Type: Public
- Established: October 10, 2012
- Affiliations: HEC
- Budget: Receipt 622.047/ Expenditure 606.862 (Million PKR) as of Financial year 2023-24
- Chancellor: Governor of Khyber Pakhtunkhwa
- Vice-Chancellor: Muhammad Tahir Khalily
- Administrative staff: ~200
- Students: ~7000
- Location: Karak, Khyber-Pakhtunkhwa, Pakistan
- Campus: Main Campus Karak
- Language: Pashto
- Colours: White, Blue,
- Nickname: KKKUK
- Website: www.kkkuk.edu.pk

Khushal Khan Khattak University Karak is a public sector university situated in Karak, Khyber Pakhtunkhwa, Pakistan. The main campus was situated on Bannu road and then it was shifted to a new location on main indus highway near Jail chowk near judicial complex of Karak & Takht-e-Nasrati.

== Overview and History ==
Khushal Khan Khattak University Karak was established by then ANP led provincial government of Khyber Pakhtunkhwa in October 2012. The Higher Education Commission (HEC) issued the No Objection Certificate (NOC) to the university vide notification no. 15-27/HEC/A&A/2013/1361.

The university is named after famous Pashtoon warrior and poet Khushal Khan Khattak. In May 2017, KPOGCL starts the company's chair in the university in order to establish close liaison with the academia for which Memorandum of Understanding (MoU) was signed in 2016. The construction of new main campus of the university was started in mid-2023 adjacent to Indus Highway near jail chowk which will be completed in 2024.

== Departments ==
The university has the following departments as of 2026.

- Department of Education and Research
- Department of Computer Science and Bioinformatics
- Department of Management Sciences
- Department of Communication & Media Studies
- Department of English
- Department of Library & Information Science
- Department of Material Physics and Nanotechnology
- Department of Geology
- Department of Mathematics
- Department of psychology
- Department of Political Science
- Department of Zoology
- Department of Botany
- Department of Chemistry
- Department of Medical Laboratory technology (MLT)

== Programs & Courses ==
The university currently offers the following degree programs and courses.

=== Undergraduate ===
- BS Computer Science
- BS Bioinformatics
- BS Physics
- BS Nanotechnology
- BS Geology
- BS English
- BS Library & Information Sciences
- BS Communication & Media Studies
- BBA (Honors)

=== Post Graduate ===
- MPhil Communication & Media Studies
- MPhil Library & Information Sciences
- MS Computer science
- MPhil English
- MS Management Sciences
- MS Physics

=== Doctoral ===
- PhD Management Sciences
- PhD LIS
- PhD Physics

== Affiliated Colleges ==
- Government Post Graduate College Karak
- GDC BD Shah
- GDC Ahmad Abad
- GDC Latamber
- GDC Takht-e-Nasrati
- GDC Sabir Abad
- Govt. college of Management sciences Karak
- GGDC Sabir Abad
- GGDC KDA Karak
- GGDC Takht-e-Nasrati
- Chokara Joint College Chokara

== Convocation ==
- 2026

Convocation for the sessions 2014 to 2025 was held on 12th of February 2026 at the new campus of the university.

== See also ==
- Government Post Graduate College Karak
- Kohat University of Science and Technology
- University of Science and Technology Bannu
- Universities in Pakistan
