= Government Post Graduate College Karak =

Pakistani college

Coordinates: 33°06′16″N 71°03′52″E

- Address: Bannu Road Toordand Karak, Pakistan
- Type: Public Sector
- Established: 1972
- Location: Karak, Pakistan
- Website: Official Website

Government Post Graduate College Karak is public sector college located in Karak Khyber Pakhtunkhwa, Pakistan. The college offers programs for intermediate level both in Arts and Science groups for which it is affiliated with Board of Intermediate and Secondary Education Kohat. The college also offers 2-year BA & BSc programs plus 4 years BS programs in various disciplines for which it is affiliated with Khushal Khan Khattak University. Government Post Graduate College Karak, was affiliated with Kohat University of Science and Technology, but after the establishment of Khushal Khan Khattak University in 2012, the college is now affiliated with Khushal Khan Khattak University of district Karak.

== Overview and history ==
Government Post Graduate College Karak is one of the most renowned college in Karak. It was established in 1972. The college was started as Intermediate level college in two rooms small building. The college was moved to its current campus and degree classes were started in 1974. Science classes were started in 1977. In 1988, the college was upgraded to Post graduate level and master level degree courses in Mathematics and English were started. A 4 years BS Program in Physics was started in 2010 in accordance with national education policy 2009.

== Vision ==
The college cherishes it as a holy dream to prepare enlightened future builders and leaders of the society. The graduates of this institution are to shoulder national and global responsibilities with humanistic approach towards solution of variegated issues that the present world is facing.

== Departments and faculties ==
The college has the following departments and faculties.

=== Social Sciences ===
- Department of Economics
- Department of English
- Department of Geography
- Department of Health and Physical Education
- Department of Islamiyat
- Department of Law
- Department of Pak Studies
- Department of Pashto
- Department of Political Science
- Department of Urdu

=== Biological Sciences ===
- Department of Botany
- Department of Zoology

=== Physical Sciences ===
- Department of Chemistry
- Department of Computer Science
- Department of Mathematics
- Department of Statistics
- Department of Physics

== Programs ==
The college currently offers the following programs.

=== Intermediate Courses ===
- FSc – Pre-Medical (2 years)
- FSc – Pre-Engineering (2 years)
- FSc – Computer Science (2 years)
- FA – General Science (2 years)
- FA – Humanities (2 years)

=== BS Degrees (4 years) ===
- BS Physics
- BS Mathematics
- BS English
- BS Botany
- BS Zoology
- BS Chemistry
- BS Political Science
- BS Economics

- Bs pashto
- Bs Urdu

== See also ==
- Khushal Khan Khattak University
- Government Post Graduate College Bannu
- Government Post Graduate College Lakki Marwat
