= IMSciences =

Institute of Management Sciences
- Motto: Management Education with Public Spirit and Market Dynamism
- Type: Public
- Established: 1995
- Affiliations: NBEAC, NCEAC, HEC
- Endowment: Rs. 42m
- Director: Prof. Dr. Usman Ghani 1
- Students: 5000+
- Location: Peshawar, Pakistan
- Acronym: IMSciences
- Website: www.imsciences.edu.pk/

The Institute of Management Sciences (also known as IMSciences) is a public sector government owned autonomous institution recognized by Higher Education Commission. The institute was founded in 1995 from elements of the University of Peshawar. In the Higher Education Commission (HEC) rankings for 2010, the institute was ranked 7th in the Business Education category. In the subsequent HEC rankings for 2013–14 and 2015, it improved to 5th and 4th position respectively among business schools in Pakistan.

The institute is located in the Hayatabad area of Peshawar and is organised into four faculties —management sciences, computer sciences, information technology and liberal arts.

It is recognised as a degree-awarding institution by the Higher Education Commission of Pakistan and is chartered by the Government of Khyber Pakhtunkhwa.

The institute has two incubation centers: IM|Durshal, a combined program of KPITB and IM|Sciences, and the Business Incubation Centre (BIC).

== Degrees offered ==
The institute has been granting degrees since 2005 at undergraduate, graduate and postgraduate levels.

- Undergraduate Programs
  - Bachelor of Business Administration (BBA)
  - BS Accounting and Finance
  - BS Business Analytics
  - BS Hospitality & Tourism
  - BS Economics
  - BS Social Sciences
  - BS Psychology
  - BS English
  - BS Computer Science
  - BS Software Engineering
  - BS Artificial Intelligence
  - BS Data Science
  - BS Cyber Security
- Graduate Programs
  - Master of Business Administration (MBA)
  - MS Economics
  - MS Management
  - MS Development Studies
  - MS Project Management
  - MS Islamic Business & Finance
  - MS Governance & Public Policy
  - MS Data Science
  - MS Computer Science
  - MPhil English Linguistics
- Postgraduate Programs
  - PhD Management
  - PhD Economics
  - PhD Islamic Business & Finance
  - PhD Computer Science

The institute also offers a "split-site PhD" program with the Southampton Management School at the University of Southampton in the United Kingdom.
