= Kohat University of Science & Technology =

Public university in Khyber Pakhtunkhwa, Pakistan

Kohat University of Sciences and Technology
- Motto: أَفَلا يَتَدَبَّرُونَ [وہ قران میں غور کیوں نہیں کرتے!]
- Type: Public
- Established: 2001
- Affiliations: Higher Education Commission (Pakistan), Pharmacy Council of Pakistan
- Chancellor: Governor of Khyber Pakhtunkhwa
- Vice-Chancellor: Sardar Khan
- Students: 6090
- Undergraduates: 4098
- Postgraduates: 937
- Doctoral students: 55
- Location: Kohat, Khyber Pakhtunkhwa, Pakistan
- Campus: Urban, Hangu Campus
- Colors: Pink, White & Purple
- Nickname: KUST
- Website: kust.edu.pk

The Kohat University of Science and Technology (KUST) is a public university located at the Kohat District within the Khyber Pakhtunkhwa province of Pakistan. It was established in 2001. The university was inaugurated by the then Governor of Khyber Pakhtunkhwa, Lt. Gen. Syed Iftikhar Hussain Shah(late).

== History ==
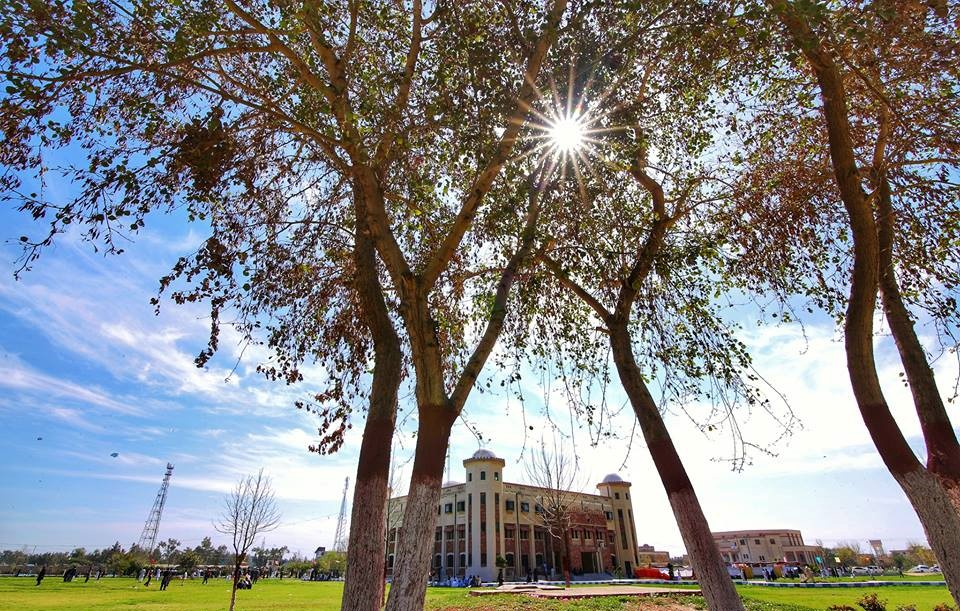
Kohat University of Science & Technology

KUST attained the status of degree-awarding institution vide NWFP ordinance No. XXIII of 2001 and the subsequent notification No. Legis: 1 (12) 2001/4451-56, of August 30, 2001.

The university was founded with four institutes - Institute of Information Technology, Institute of Management Sciences, Institute of Education and Research and Department of Microbiology. These offered two-year and four-year bachelor degrees and two-year master degrees in 2004. Later on, the university was expanded by establishing departments in Physics, Chemistry, Botany, Zoology (Dr. Farzana Perveen has established the department of Zoology at KUST from the beginning and brings it up) and Microbiology. These departments offer B.S. (Hons.), M.Sc., M.Phil. and Ph.D. degree programs.

The first vice chancellor of the university was Prof. Dr. Sher Ali Khan Shinwari.

KUST is ranked 22 in the general category of the Higher Education Commission (Pakistan) rankings.

== Faculties ==
=== Physical & Numerical Sciences ===
- Institute of Computing
- Institute of Numerical Sciences
- Department of Physics

=== Social Sciences ===
- Institute of Business Studies
- Institute of Education & Research
- Department of English
- Department of Pashto
- Department of Islamic Studies
- Department of Economics
- Department of Pakistan Studies
- Department of Journalism & Mass Communication
- Department of Education Psychology
- Department of Social Work
- Department of Sociology

=== Biological Sciences ===
- Department of Biotechnology & Genetics Engineering
- Department of Microbiology
- Department of Botany
- Department of Zoology
- Department of Environmental Sciences
- Department of Medical Lab Technologies

=== Faculty of Chemical & Pharmaceutical Sciences ===
- Department of Chemistry
- Department of Pharmacy

=== Allied Health Sciences ===
- Doctor of physical therapy
- Bachelor of Science in Nursing
- Bachelor of Emergency Care
- Human Nutrition and Dietetics

== Academics ==
=== Degree programs ===
KUST offered the following degree programs. The regular duration of BS and MS/M Phil degree programs are 4 and 2 years, respectively.

Discipline	Degree Program		
Discipline	BS	MS	Ph.D
Nursing	✓		
Software Engineering	✓	✓	
Computer Sciences	✓	✓	✓
Doctor of Pharmacy (Pharm.D)	✓		
Psychology	✓		
Biotechnology & Genetic	✓	✓	✓
Biochemistry	✓	✓	
Medical Laboratory Technology	✓		
Botany	✓	✓	✓
Microbiology	✓	✓	✓
Journalism & Mass Communication	✓	✓	
Tourism & Hospitality	✓		
Public Administration	✓	✓	✓
Business Administration	✓	✓	✓
Finance & Accounting	✓	✓	✓
Economics	✓	✓	✓
Philosophy	✓		
Mathematics	✓	✓	✓
Physics	✓	✓	✓
Chemistry	✓	✓	✓
English	✓	✓	✓
Sociology	✓	✓	
Social Work	✓	✓	
Pakistan Studies	✓	✓	
Islamic Studies	✓	✓	

== Vice Chancellors ==
List of the Vice Chancellors from the date of establishment:

- Dr Sher Ali Khan Shinwari (Late) (2001 - 2002)
- Khalid Niazi (2003 - 2004)
- Ihsan Illahi (2004)
- Zabta Khan Shinwari (2004 - 2006)
- Lutfullah Kakakheil (2007 - 2010.
- Nasir Jamal Khattak (2011 - 2014)
- Jamil Ahmed (2017–2020)
- Syed Tasleem Hussain [Acting VC] (March 2020 - 2021
- Prof. Dr. Sardar Khan (2021–2024)
- Prof.Dr Naseer ud din (2024 –2025)
- Prof. Dr. Zafar Ilyas (6th May 2025 to Present)
