= Khyber Pakhtunkhwa =

Province of Pakistan

Khyber Pakhtunkhwa خیبر پختونخوا (Urdu) خېبر پښتونخوا (Pashto)
- Province
- Province of Khyber Pakhtunkhwa
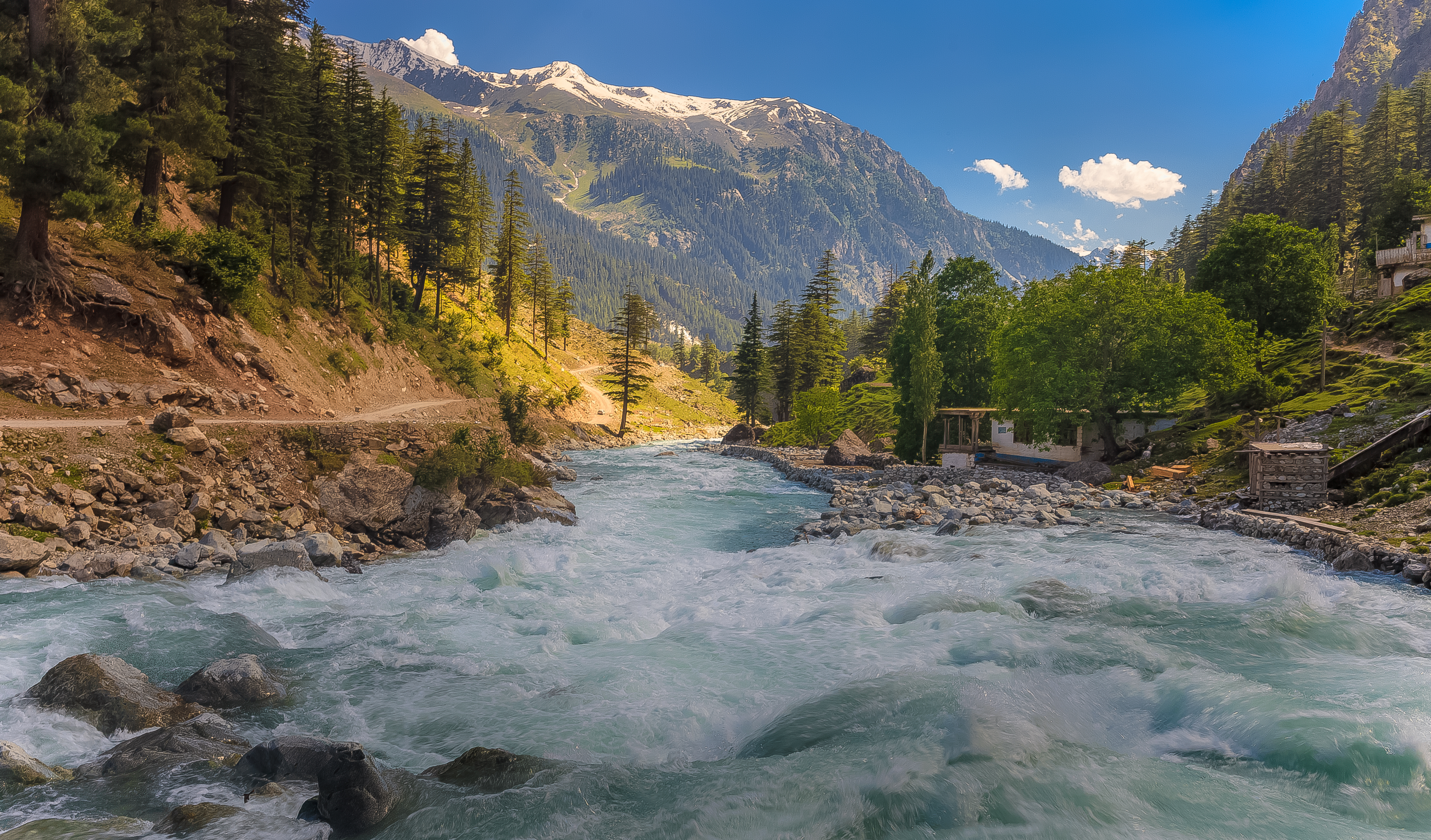
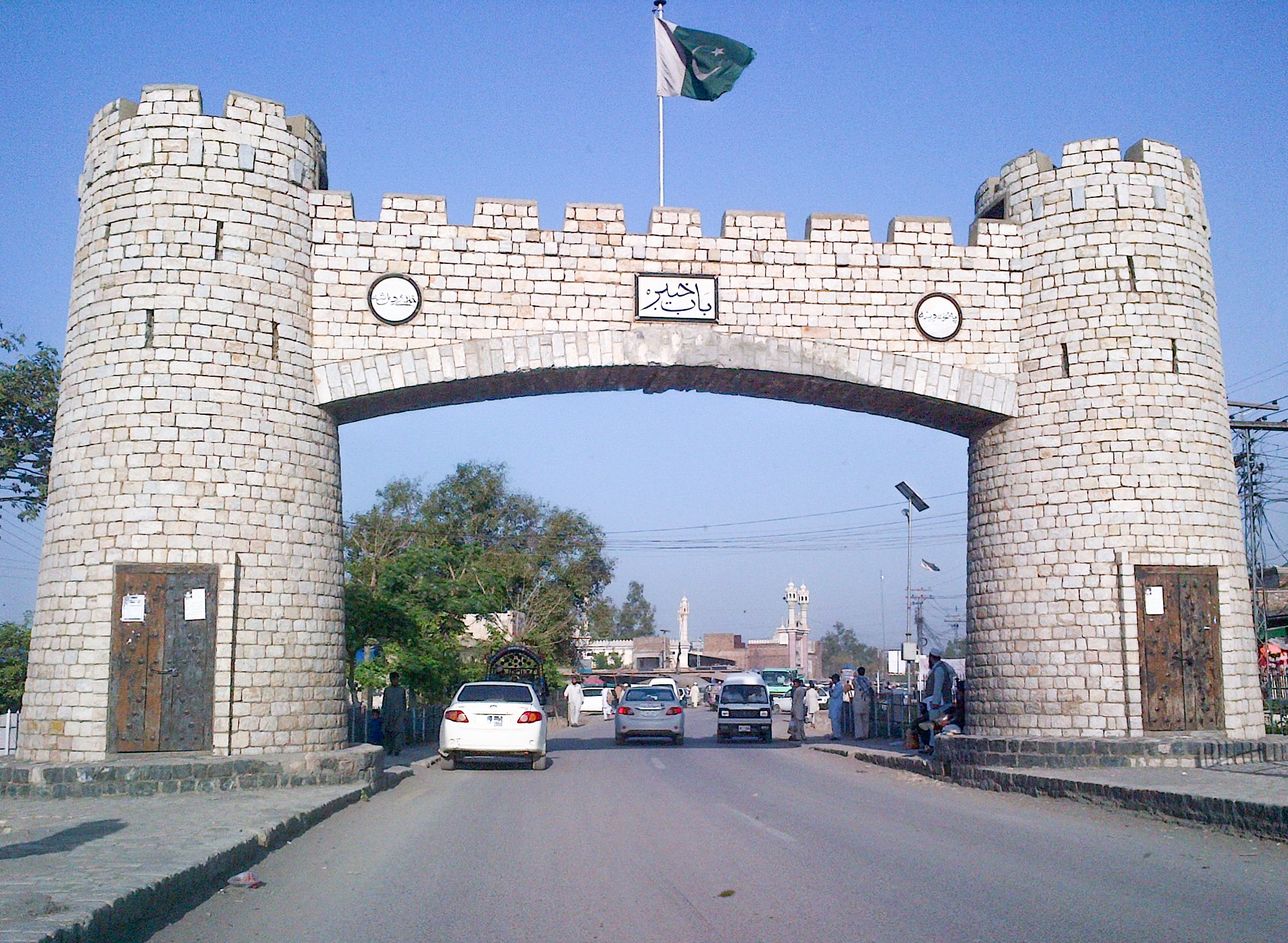
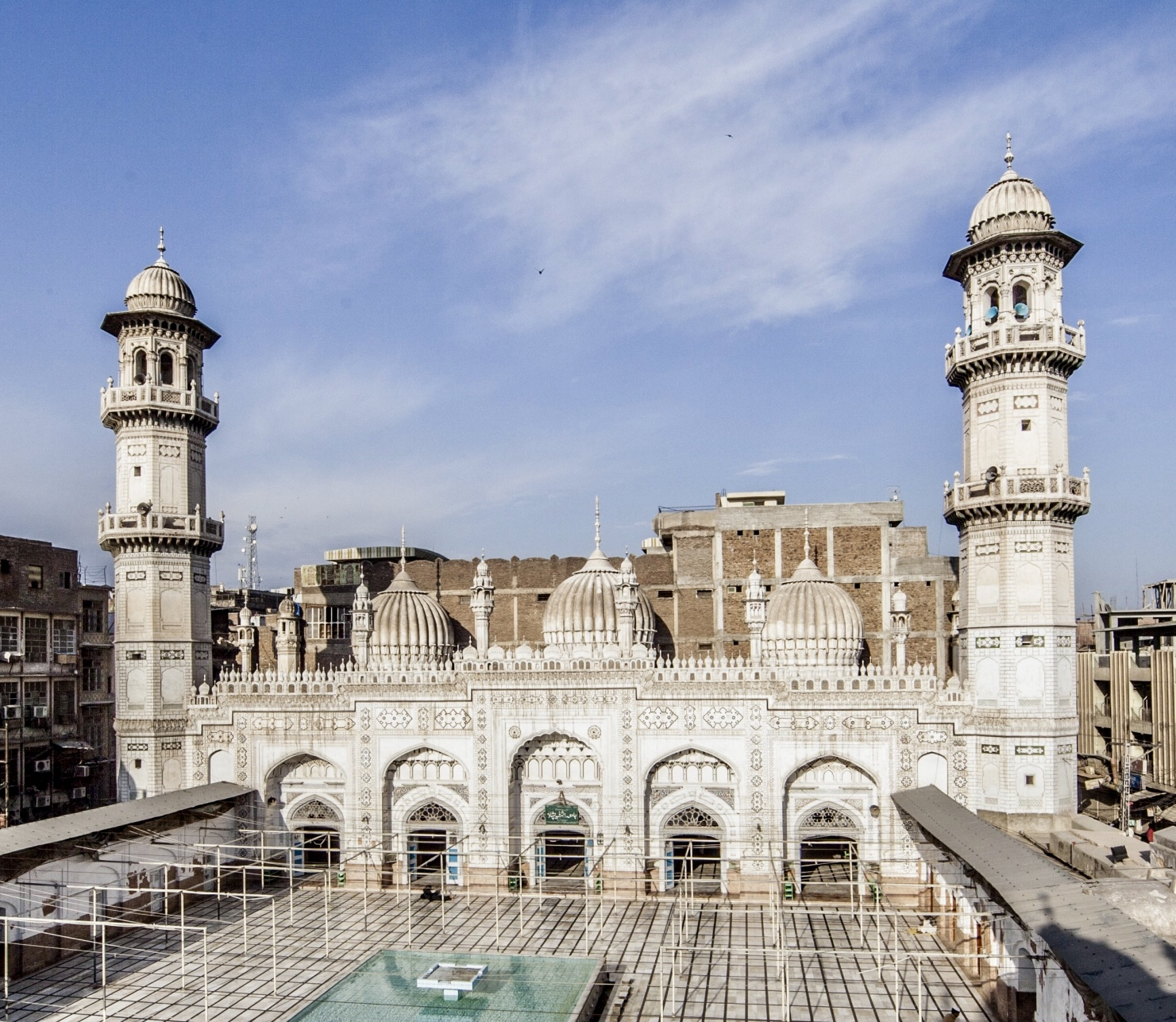
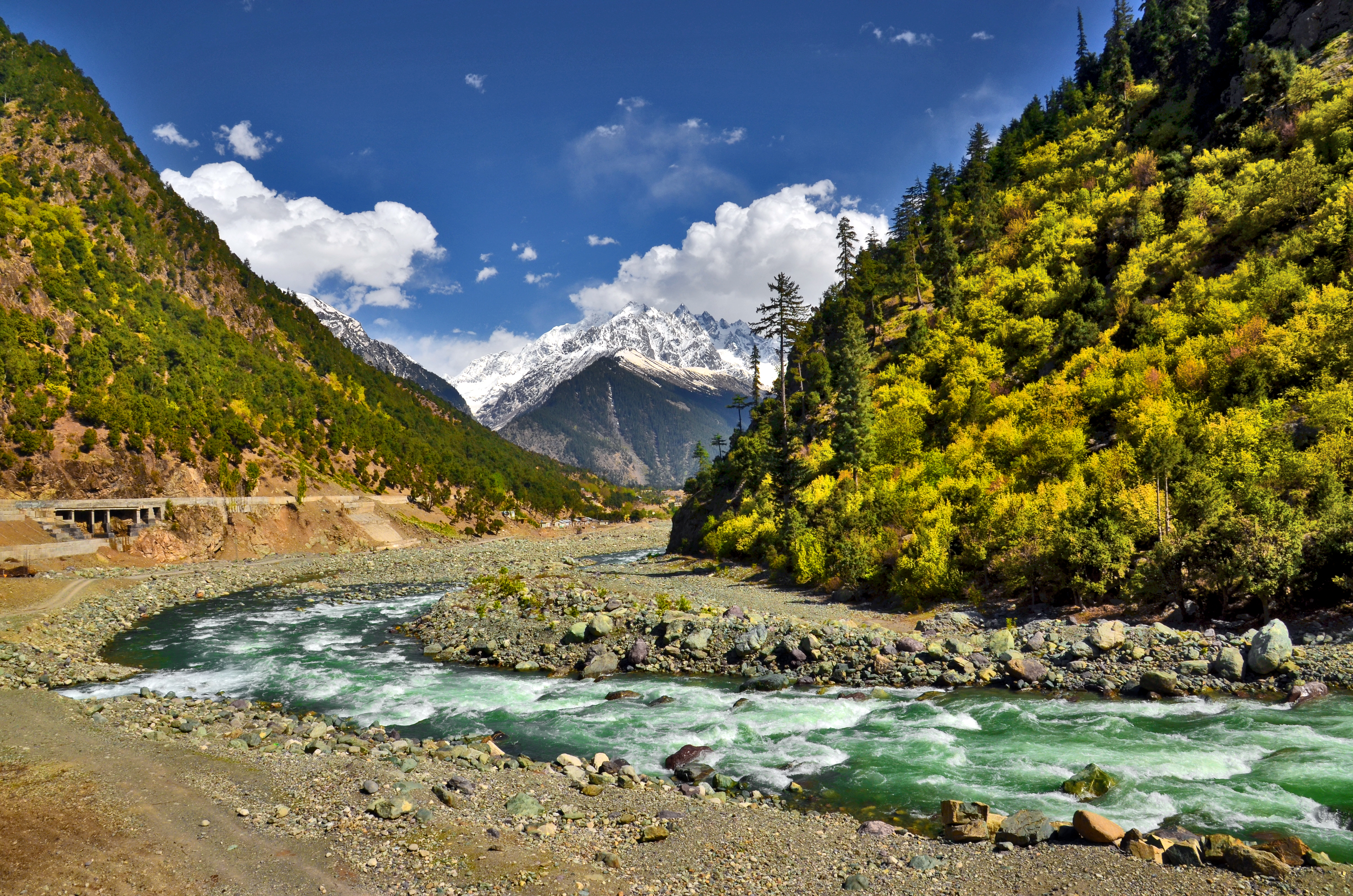
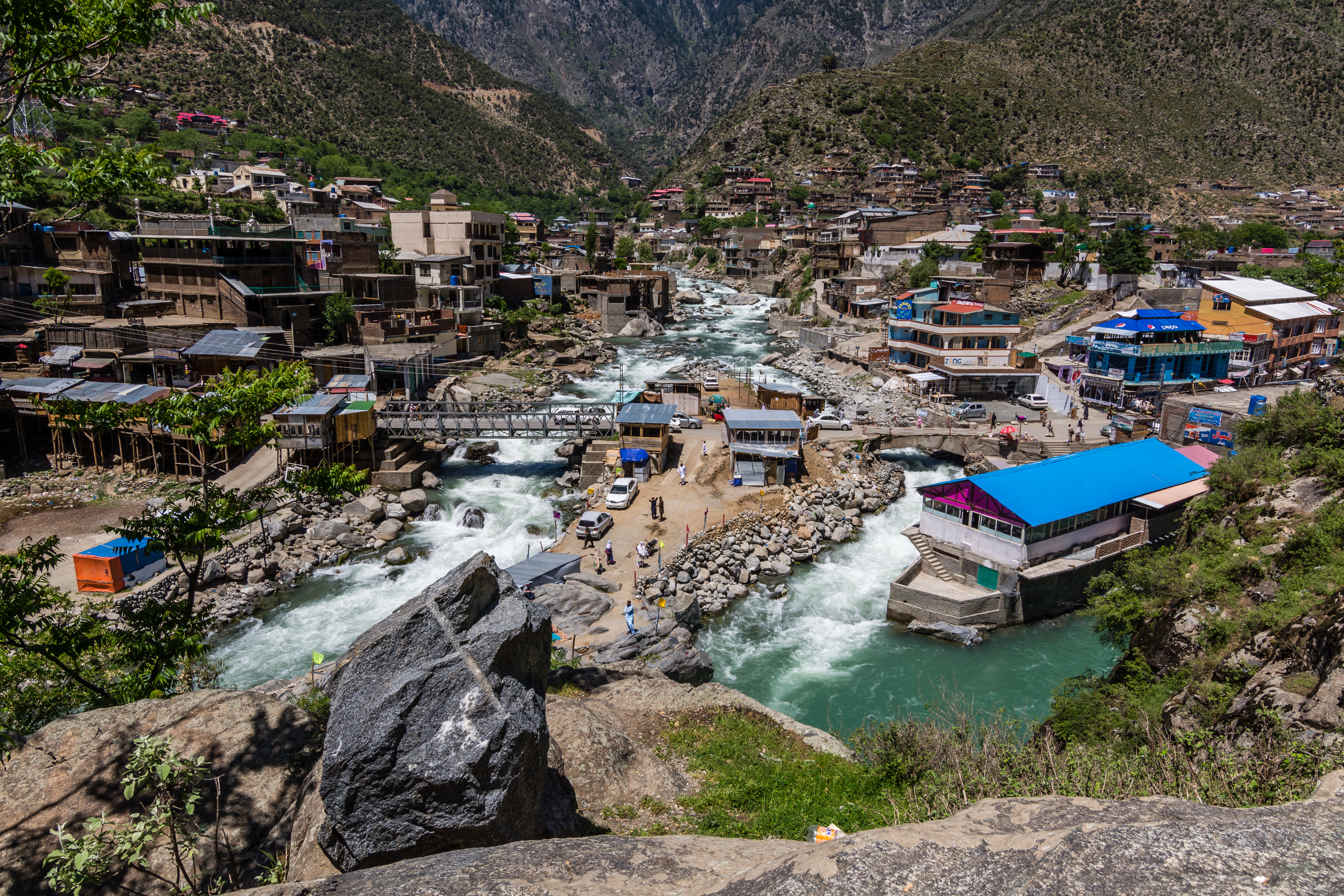
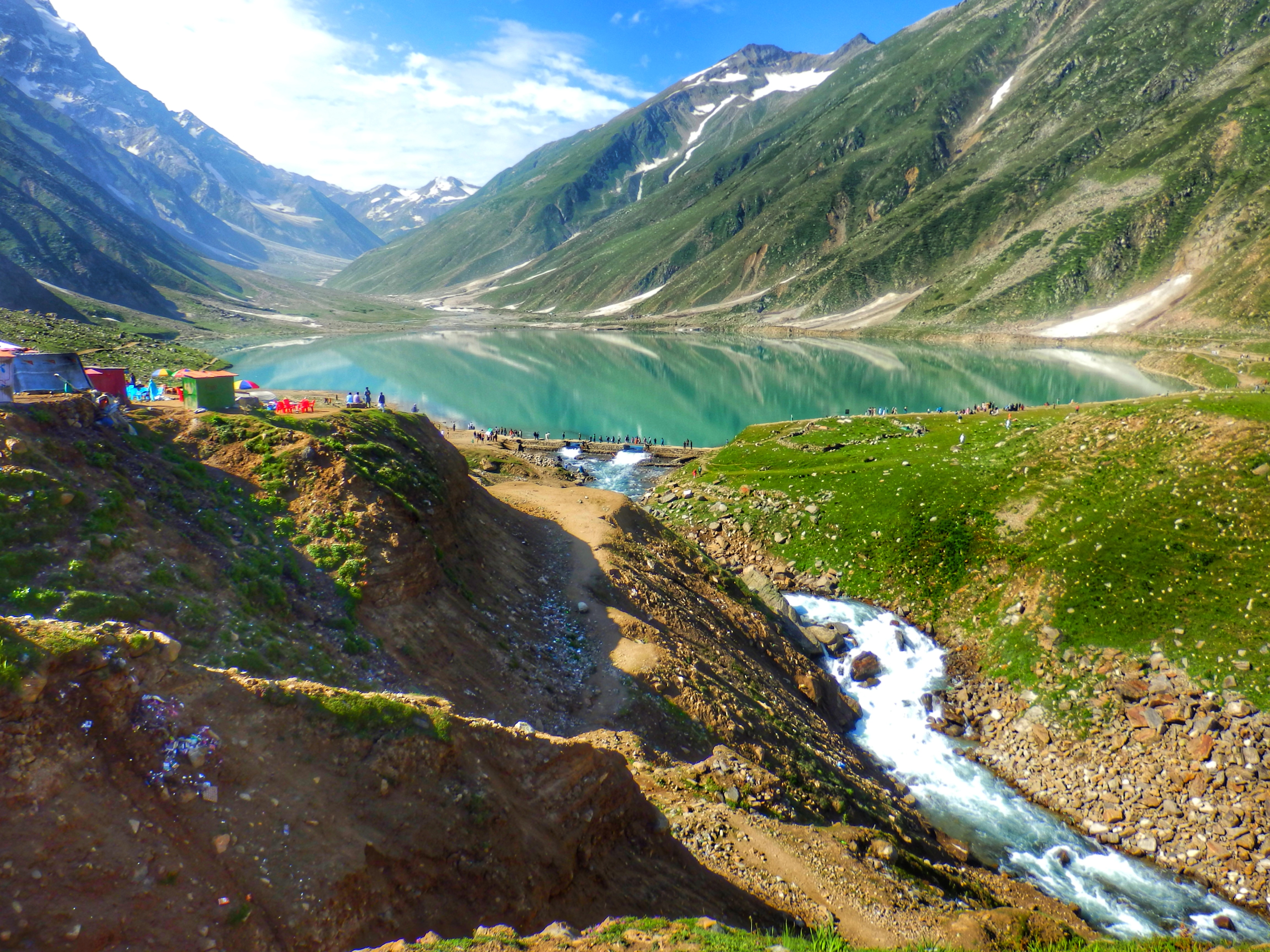
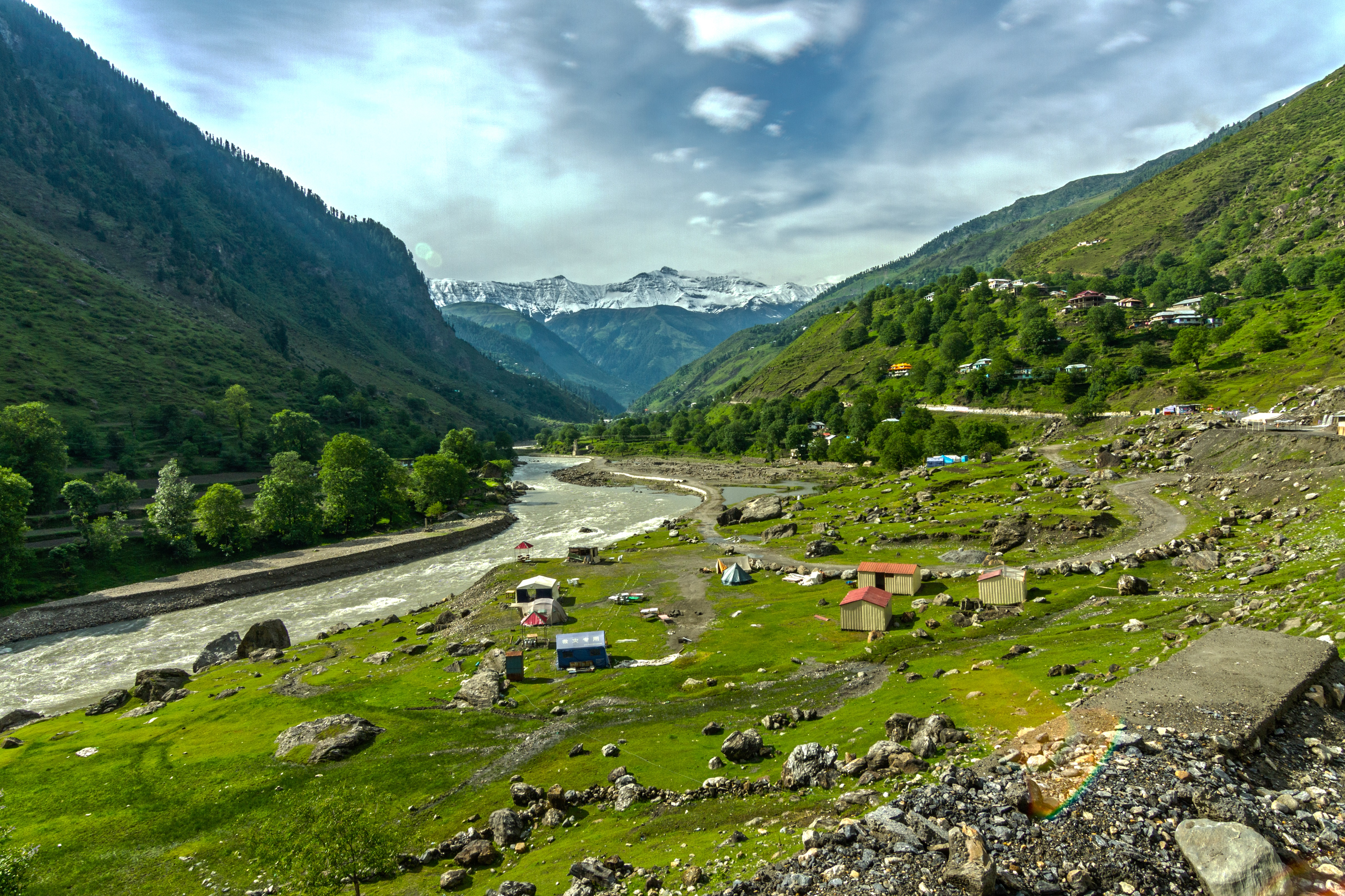
- Swat River Bab-e-Khyber Mahabat Khan Mosque Kalam Valley Bahrain Lake Saiful Muluk Kaghan Valley

- Flag Seal

- Location of Khyber Pakhtunkhwa within Pakistan
- Coordinates: 34.00°N 71.32°E
- Country: Pakistan
- Established (as NWFP): 9 November 1901; 125 years ago
- Accession to Pakistan: 14 August 1947; 79 years ago
- Merged into West Pakistan: 1955; 71 years ago
- Restoration: 1 July 1970; 56 years ago
- Renamed: 15 April 2010; 16 years ago
- FATA Merger: 31 May 2018; 8 years ago
- Capital and largest city: Peshawar
- Administrative Divisions: 07: Bannu Division Dera Ismail Khan Division Hazara Division Kohat Division Malakand Division Mardan Division Peshawar Division

Government
  - Type: Federated parliamentary government
  - Body: Government of Khyber Pakhtunkhwa
  - Governor: Faisal Karim Kundi
  - Chief Secretary: Nadeem Aslam Chaudhry
  - Legislature: Provincial Assembly
  - High Court: Peshawar High Court

Area
  - Province: 101,741 km^{2} (39,282 sq mi)
  - Rank: 4th

Population (2023 census)
  - Province: 40,856,097
  - Rank: 3rd
  - Density: 402/km^{2} (1,040/sq mi)
  - Urban: 6,131,296 (15.01%)
  - Rural: 34,724,801 (84.99%)

GDP (nominal)
  - Total (2022): $38 billion (3rd) (Note: KPK's contribution to national economy was 10.39%, or $152 billion (PPP) and $38 billion (nominal) in 2022.)

GDP (PPP)
  - Total (2022): $152 billion (3rd)
- Time zone: UTC+05:00 (PKT)
- Area code: 9291
- ISO 3166 code: PK-KP
- Official languages: Urdu; English
- Spoken: Pashto; Hindko; Saraiki; Kohistani; Gujari; Khowar; Shina; Kalasha
- Notable sports teams: List: Peshawar Zalmi; Peshawar Panthers; Khyber Pakhtunkhwa cricket team
- HDI (2019): 0.529 ▲ low
- Literacy rate (2023): Total: (51.09%); Male: (64.57%); Female: (37.15%)
- Seats in National Assembly: 65
- Seats in Provincial Assembly: 145
- Divisions: 7
- Districts: 38
- Tehsils: 105
- Union councils: 986
- Website: kp.gov.pk

Khyber Pakhtunkhwa (Note: /ˌkaɪbər pəkˈtuːŋkwə/; Pashto: خېبر پښتونخوا [ˈxebaɾ paxtunˈxwɑ]; Urdu: خیبر پختونخوا, pronounced [ˈxɛːbəɾ pəxˈtuːnxʷɑː]) (abbreviated KP) is a province of Pakistan. Located in the northwestern region of the country, Khyber Pakhtunkhwa is the fourth largest province of Pakistan by land area and the third-largest province by population. It is bordered by Balochistan to the south; Punjab, Islamabad Capital Territory, and Azad Kashmir to the east; and Gilgit-Baltistan to the north and northeast. It shares an international border with Afghanistan to the west. Khyber Pakhtunkhwa has a varied geography of rugged mountain ranges, valleys, rolling foothills, and dense agricultural farms.

The history of the present province of Khyber Pakhtunkhwa is characterized by frequent invasions by various empires, largely due to its geographical proximity to the historically important Khyber Pass. It was the site of the ancient Gandhara, and was historically a stronghold of Buddhism. Islam became dominant in the region after the 11th-century conquest of the Hindu Shahi kingdom by the Ghaznavids. The predecessor of the present province was constituted in 1901, under the British Raj, when the North-West Frontier Province (NWFP) was created by bifurcating the northwestern districts of the erstwhile Punjab Province. In 1969, the princely states of Chitral, Swat and Dir were merged into the province, while on 24 May 2018, the FATA as well as the PATA were merged into Khyber Pakhtunkhwa after the 25th Constitutional Amendment.

Although it is colloquially known by a variety of other names, the present name was brought into effect for the North-West Frontier Province in April 2010, following the enactment of the 18th Constitutional Amendment. While it is the third-largest Pakistani province in terms of both its population and its economy, it is geographically the smallest. Khyber Pakhtunkhwa is a multiethnic province that makes up 16.9% of Pakistan's total population. Numerous ethnolinguistic and ethnic groups reside across different parts of the province.

== Etymology ==
The present name Khyber Pakhtunkhwa means the "Khyber side of the land of the Pashtuns", where the word Pakhtunkhwa is variously translated as the "land of Pashtuns", or "Pashtun culture and society". For over a hundred years after its creation as a province of British Raj in 1901, it was known as the North-West Frontier Province until 2010 due to its relative location being in the northwest of the nation. After the independence of Pakistan, it continued with the name but a Pashtun political party, Awami National Party based in the province demanded that the province name be changed to "Pakhtunkhwa". They reasoned that names of other provinces, namely Punjab, Sindh and Balochistan denoted their dominant ethnicities but that was not the case for Pashtun people.

Although Pakistan Muslim League – Nawaz (PML–N) and Pakistan People's Party (PPP), the largest political parties in the 1990s, supported the name amendment proposed by ANP, Pakistan Muslim League wanted a neutral name which did not carry an exclusively Pashtun identity in it, as it argued that there were other ethnic communities living in the province, such as the Hazarewals of the Hazara region, which opposed the proposed name. The NWFP chief minister, Sardar Mehtab Ahmed Khan, called for a referendum on the issue as a way of determining the name in 1997, but this was rejected by ANP who threatened to withdraw from national politics.

In early 2010, the process of renaming proceeded and the Pakistani Senate confirmed the name change to Khyber Pakhtunkhwa in the 18th amendment to the Constitution of Pakistan with unanimous voting on 15 April 2010. The name change was met with protests by other ethnic minorities, who feared increased dominance by Pashtuns. On 10 April 2010, the Khyber Pakhtunkhwa Police acting on the direction of ANP government opened fire at unarmed protesters, killing seven and injuring dozens, and protests against the name change and for a separate province were suppressed through police violence.

The word Khyber was introduced in the name as it is the name of a major pass which connects Pakistan to Afghanistan. The province has had various names throughout history. The name Gandhāra, of an ancient civilization centered in the present-day province, was also proposed by PMLN, as a neutral name for the province. Other names used or proposed for the province include Sarhad, Afghania, Pashtunistan, Pathanistan, Sarhad, Abaseen, Khyber, or a combination of these names, such as Hazara-Pakhtunkhwa and Gandhara-Pakhtunkhwa.

== History ==
=== Ancient history ===
The Indus Valley Civilisation (3300 BCE – 1700 BCE) was one of the earliest human civilisations to emerge in the region. Considered a cradle of civilisation, its decline was followed by migration of Indo-Iranian peoples from Central Asia, which gave rise to Gandhara grave culture, later developing into the Gandhara civilisation. Gandhara features prominently in the Vedic mythology, and was known for its art and sculptures, as well as Buddhist culture. The people of Gandhara spoke Gandhari language. Gandhara was conquered by Alexander the Great, who crossed the Hindu Kush in the spring of 327 BCE and defeated the tribes of Assakenoi and Gouraios.

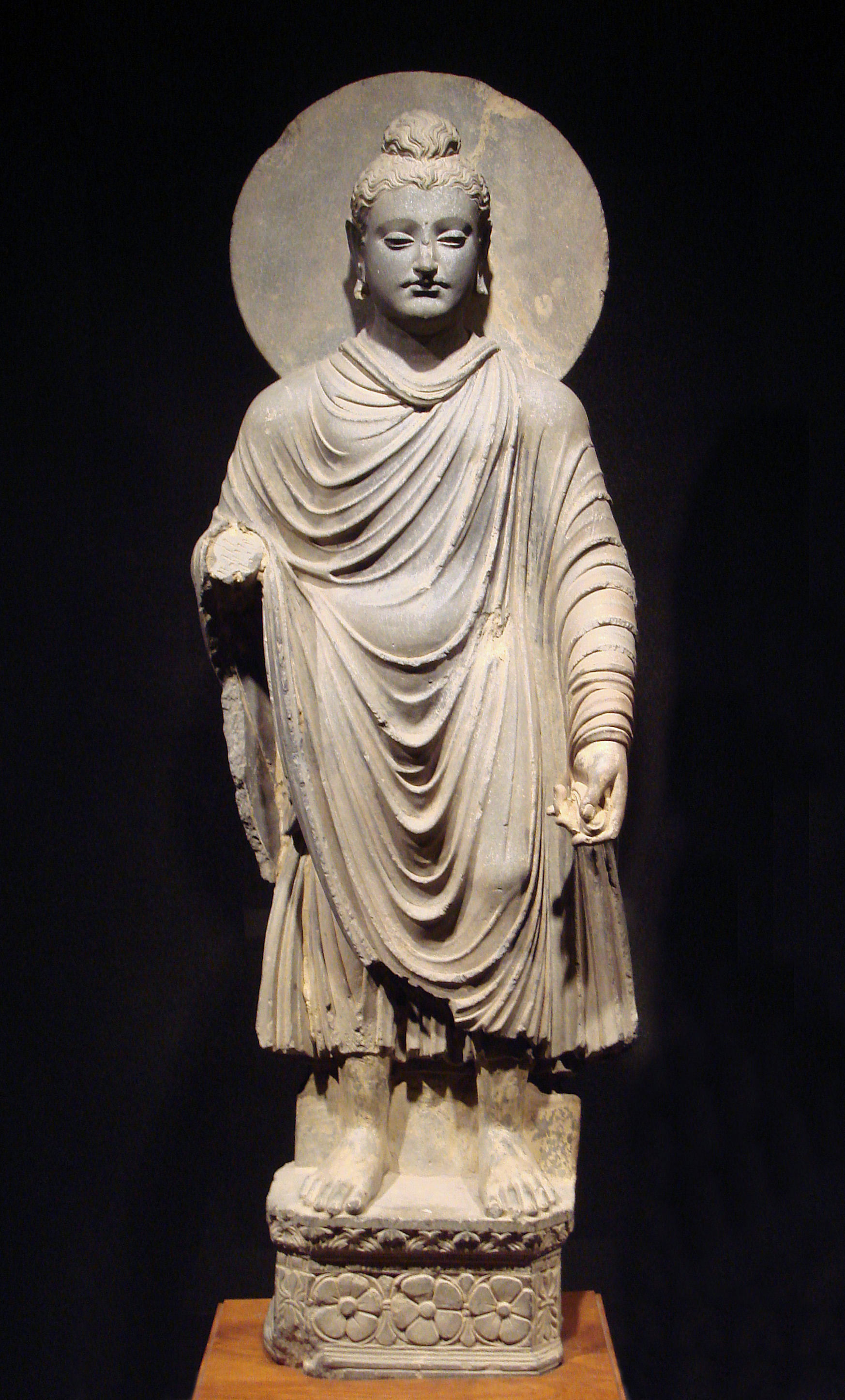
The Standing Buddha from Gandhara, a 1st century CE Gandharan Buddhist representation of the Buddha.

The Macedonian rule did not remain for long, as soon Chandragupta Maurya entered into conflict with Seleucus I Nicator, the successor of Alexander in Persia. A short war between the two emperors was followed by a peace treaty in 302 BCE; Seleucus ceded the lands of Aria, Arachosia, Gandhara, and Gedrosia to Chandragupta in exchange for a matrimonial alliance and 500 elephants. Ashoka the Great, the grandson of Chandragupta, spent his youth as viceroy in the region. He converted to Buddhism and made it the official religion of the empire. His rock-inscriptions are found at Shahbazgarhi and Mansehra.

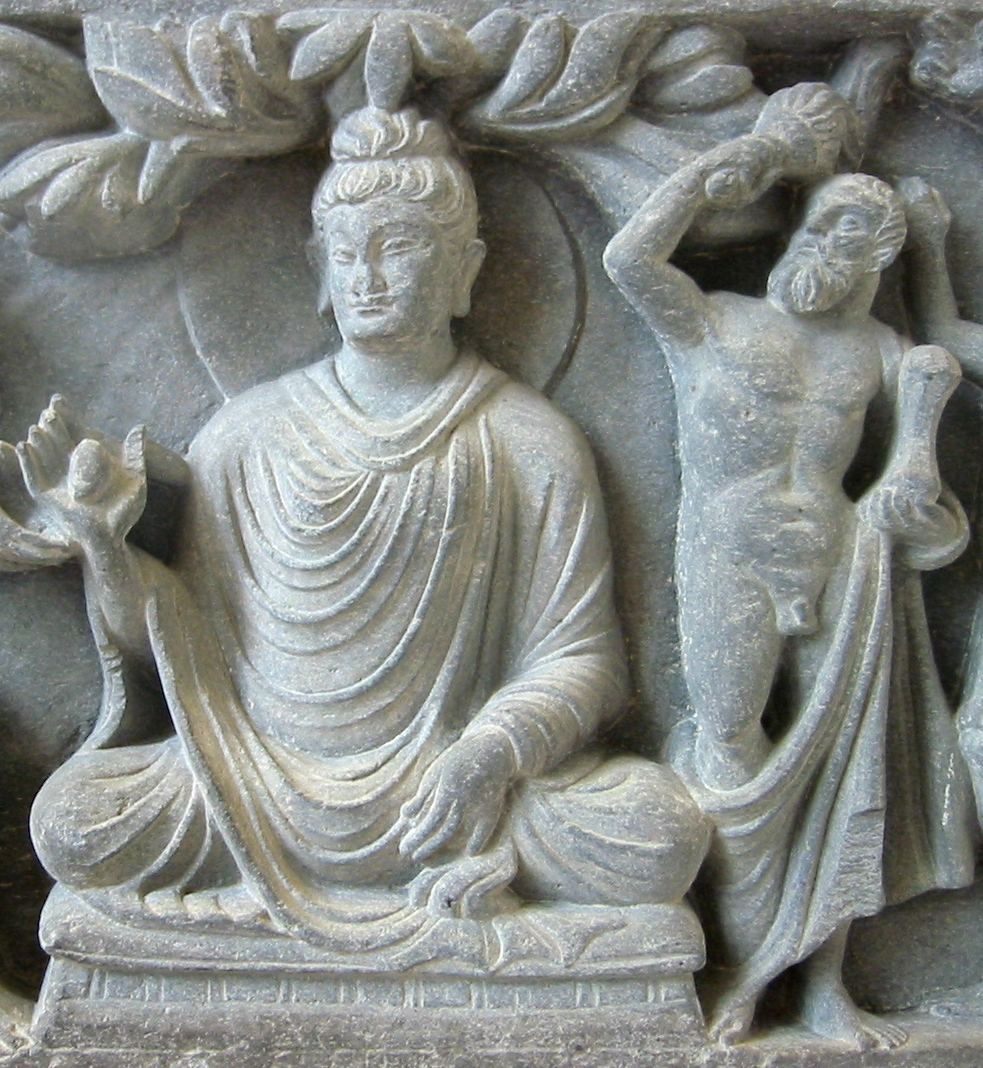
Greco-Buddhist representation of the Buddha, seated to the left of a depiction of Vajrapani in the guise of the Hellenic god Heracles.

The decline of Mauryas allowed Greco-Bactrians to expand into Gandhara under Demetrius I. Menander I (reigned 155–130 BCE), the greatest of the Indo-Greeks, drove the Greco-Bactrians out of Gandhara and beyond the Hindu Kush, becoming king shortly after his victory.

The last known Indo-Greek ruler was Theodamas, from the Bajaur area of Gandhara, mentioned on a 1st-century CE signet ring, bearing the Kharoṣṭhī inscription "Su Theodamasa" (Su was the Greek transliteration of the Kushan royal title Shau "Shah" or "King"). The migrating Indo-Scythian tribes from Central Asia displaced the Indo-Greeks and ruled a kingdom that stretched from Gandhara to Mathura from the middle of the 2nd century BCE to the 1st century BCE. They were replaced by yet another group of central Asian origins, the Indo-Parthians, who built the Buddhist monastery of Takht-i-Bahi. They had Taxila in Punjab as their residence, but during their last few years of existence the capital shifted between Kabul and Peshawar.

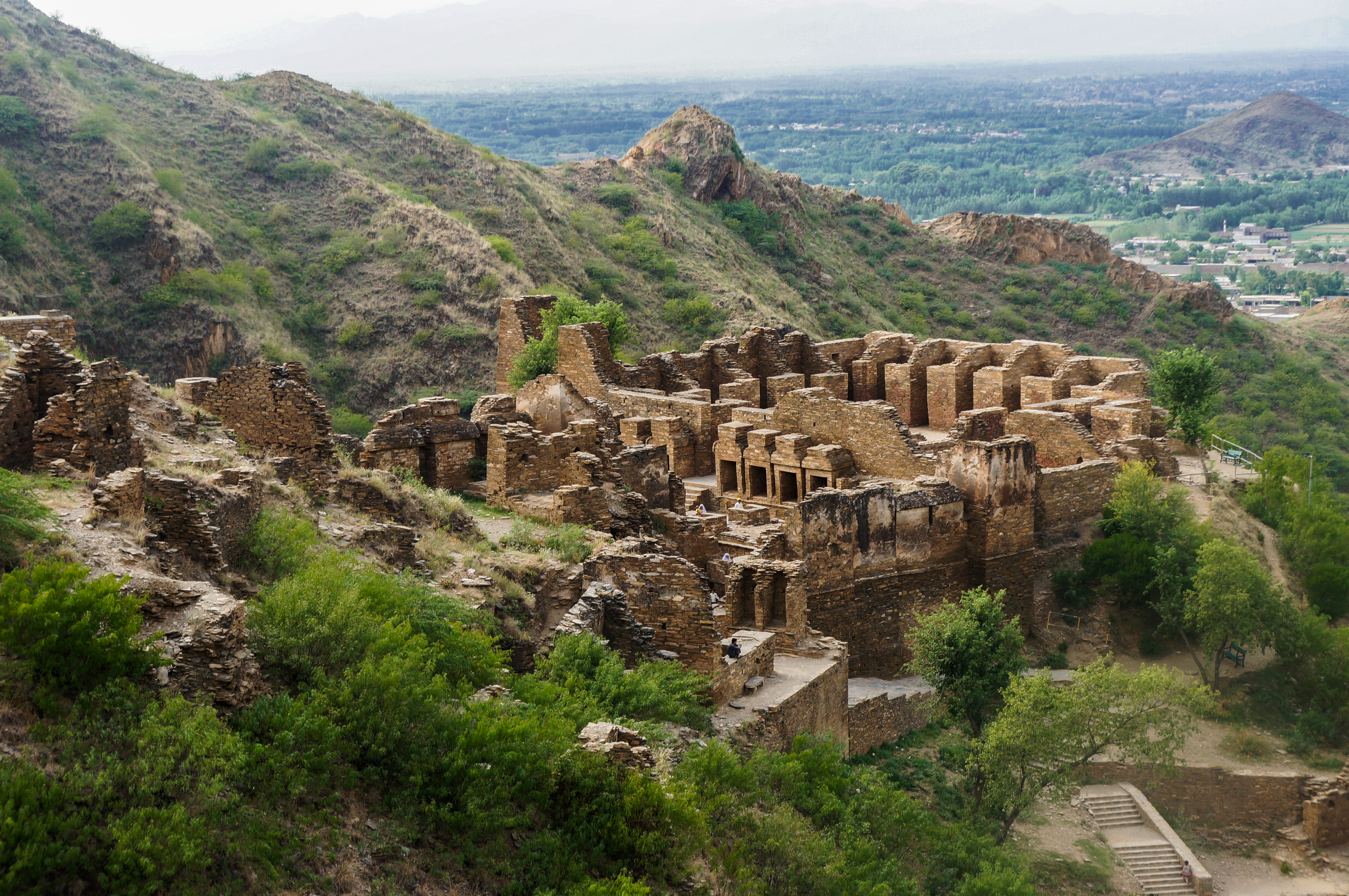
Ancient Buddhist monastery Takht-i-Bahi (a UNESCO World Heritage Site) constructed by the Indo-Parthians.

In the first century CE, the Yuezhi nomads were forced southwards by the nomadic Xiongnu. One group, known as the Kushan, took the lead, and its chief Kadphises I seized vast territories extending south to the Kabul valley. Their greatest ruler was Kanishka the Great, who had his capital at Peshawar and like Ashoka patronised Buddhism.

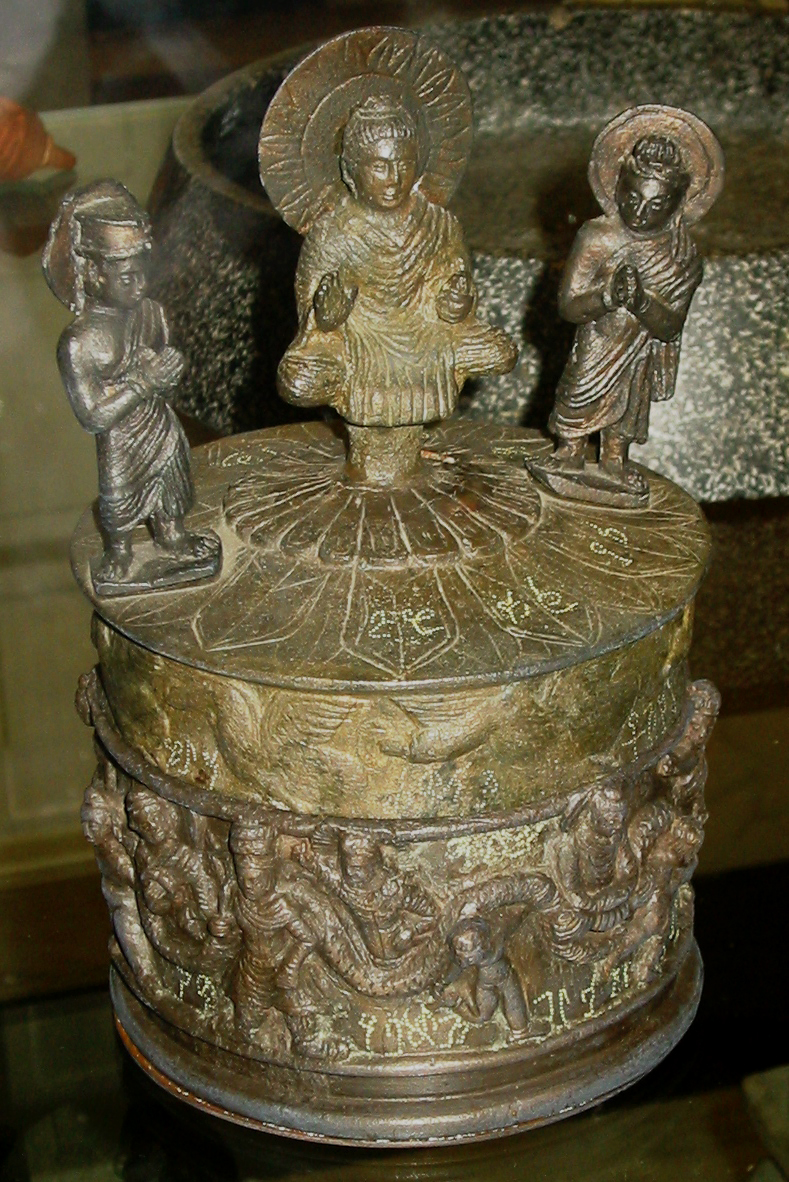
The Kanishka stupa once kept sacred Buddhist relics in the Kanishka casket.

Kushans were followed by various groups of Huna people. The reign of Alchon Hun ruler Mihirakula in the 6th century was particularly disastrous for the Buddhism, as he prosecuted Buddhists and destroyed their monasteries, resulting in the rise of Hinduism in Gandhara.

=== Medieval history ===
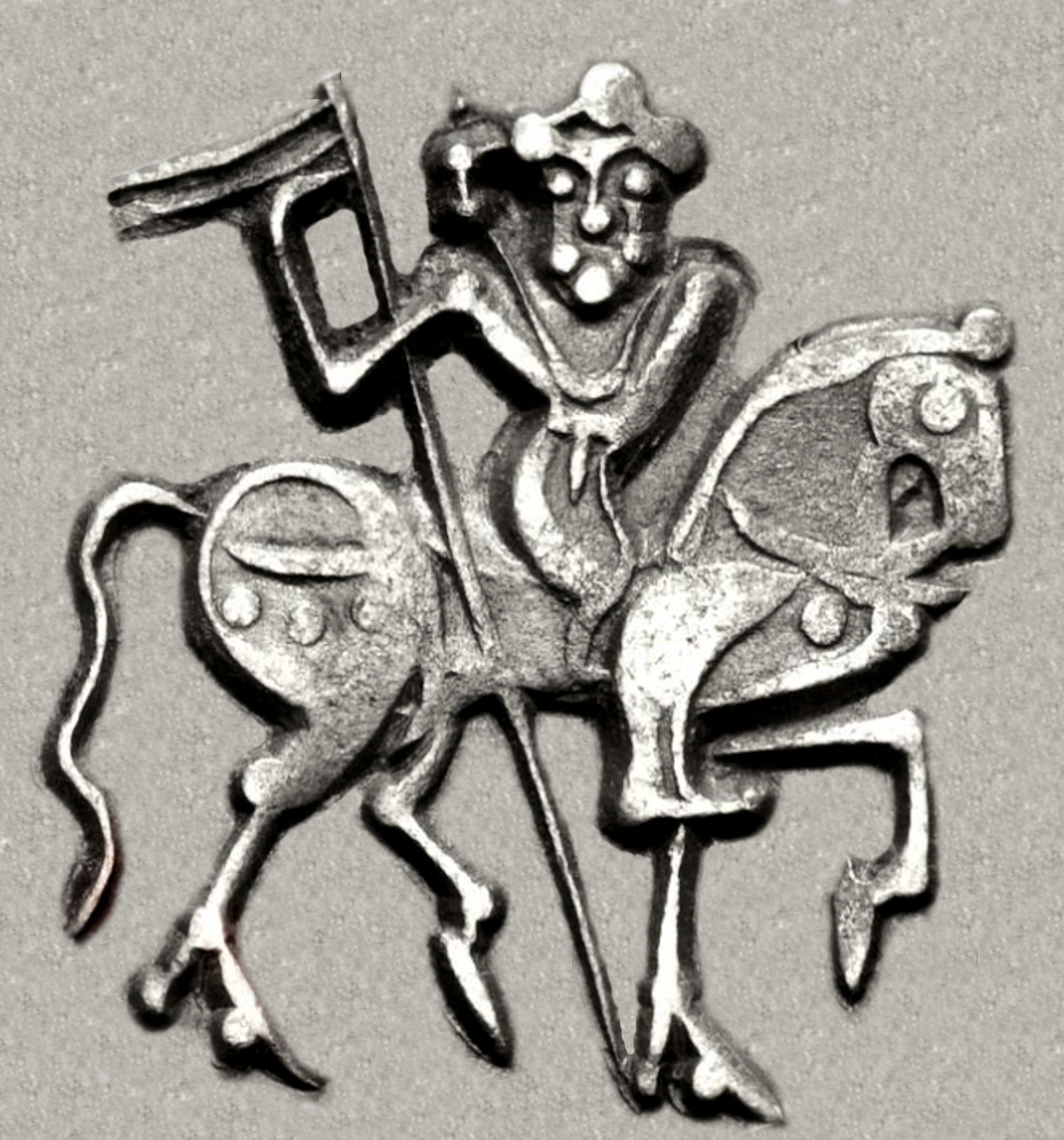
Horseman on a coin of Spalapati, i.e. the "War-lord" of the Hindu Shahis. The headgear has been interpreted as a turban.

The Turk Shahis ruled Gandhara until 870, when they were overthrown by the Hindu Shahis. Of Brahman or Kshatriya origins, the Hindu Shahis are suggested by some scholars to have originated from Oddiyana (Swat). Their capital was at Udabandhapura, near the modern village of Hund. At its zenith, the kingdom stretched from Kabul and Gandhara to western Punjab under Jayapala (r. 964–1001). Jayapala fought a series of battles against the invading Ghaznavids; Ghaznavid ruler Mahmud finally annexed Gandhara by defeating Jayapala at the battle of Peshawar in 1001. Hindu Shahis continued their struggle for independence but were unsuccessful. They eventually exiled themselves to the Kashmir Siwalik hills.

Dilazak was the first Pashtun tribe to migrate to Peshawar Valley during the Ghaznavid period. Mahmud of Ghazni and his descendants reigned till 1179, when Muhammad of Ghor took Peshawar, making it part of his expanding Ghurid Empire.

Following the disintegration of the Ghurid Empire, the Delhi Sultanate rose in the subcontinent. Throughout 13th and 14th centuries Peshawar and surrounding areas remained the scene of battles between Delhi sultans and numerous invading Mongol armies. In the 15th century Yousafzais migrated to Peshawar and Swat, displacing Dilazaks and Swatis.

=== Modern period ===
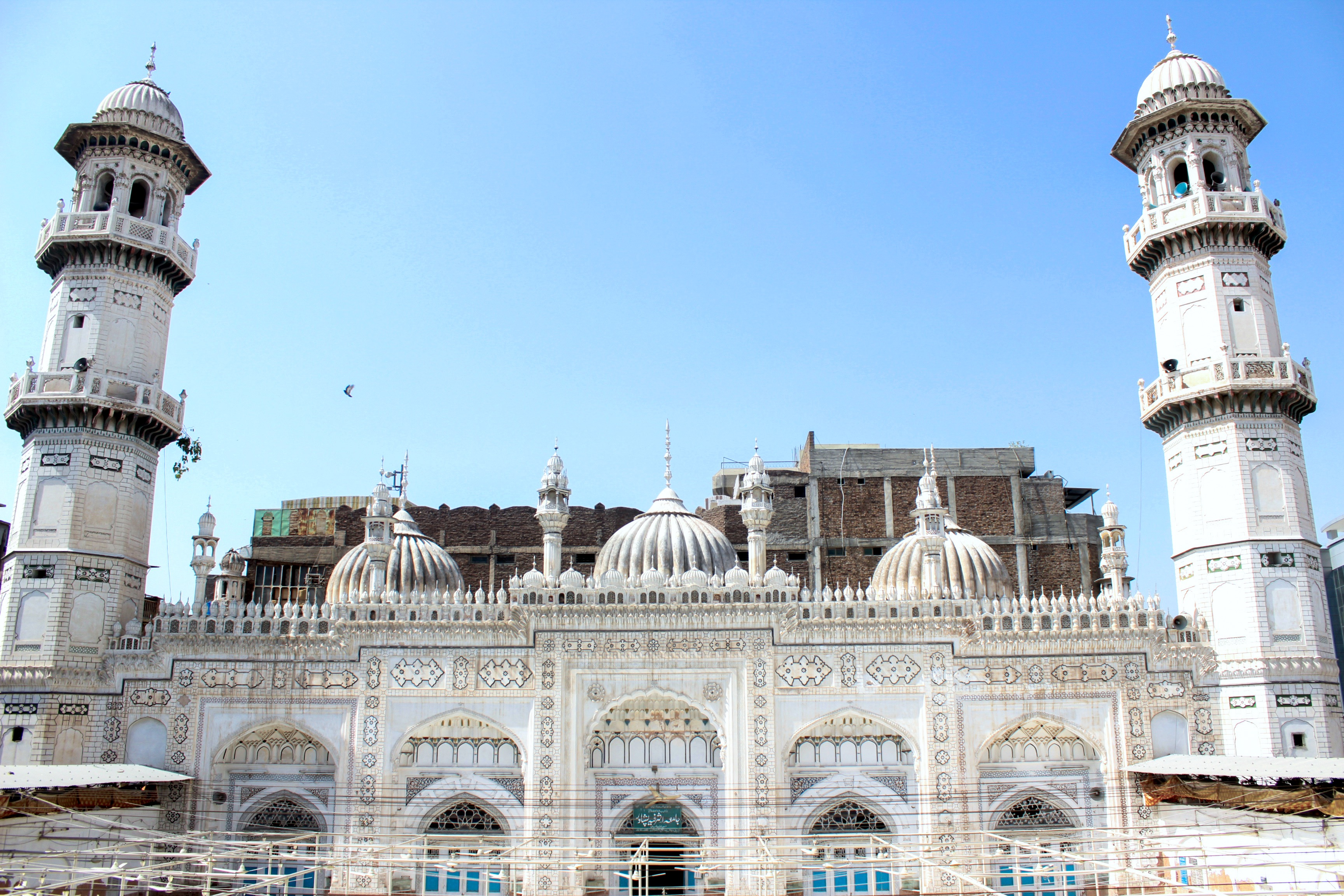
The white-marble façade of the Mohabbat Khan Mosque was founded by Mughal governor Mohabbat Khan in 1630.

In the early 16th-century, Peshawar, Kohat and surrounding areas were annexed by the Mughal emperor Babur. Babur married Bibi Mubarika, the daughter of Yousafzai chief. He noted the town of Peshawar as Bagram. His grandson, Akbar the Great carried out administrative reforms in the region in 1580. During the Mughal period, Hazara was a part of Punjab while much of rest of the present-day province was a part of Kabul Subah, which had provincial capitals at Peshawar and Kabul.

Akbar faced rebellion by the Yousafzai tribes, as did his great-grandson Aurangzeb, when they rose against Mughals in 1667, and engaged in pitched-battles with Mughal battalions in Peshawar and Attock. Afridi tribe also rebelled against Aurangzeb in 1670s. The Afridis massacred a Mughal battalion in the Khyber Pass in 1672 and shut the pass to lucrative trade routes. Following another massacre in the winter of 1673, Mughal armies led by emperor Aurangzeb himself regained control of the entire area in 1674, and enticed tribal leaders with various awards in order to pacify tribes.

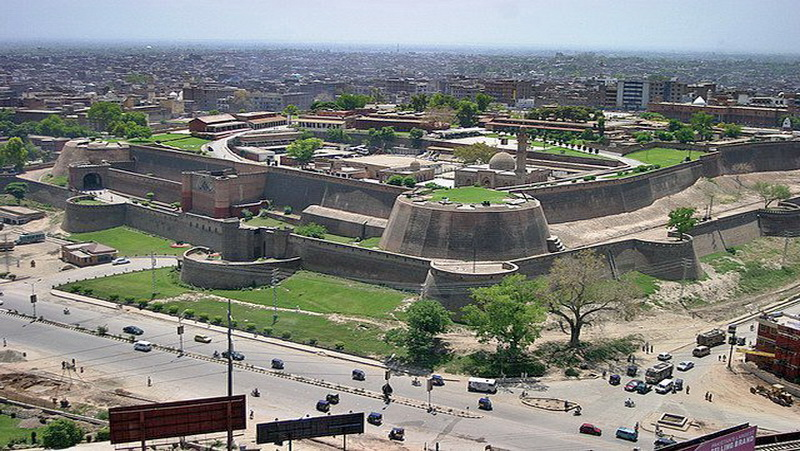
Bala Hissar fort in Peshawar was used as a royal residence for the Durrani Empire.

On 18 November 1738, Peshawar was captured by the Afsharid armies during the Persian invasion of the Mughal Empire under Nader Shah. Peshawar was invaded subsequently by Ahmad Shah Durrani, founder of the Durrani Empire, in 1748. Ahmad Shah expanded his rule over Kashmir, Sindh and much of Punjab. His rule was briefly interrupted by an invasion of the Marathas, who ruled over Peshawar for eleven months from 1758 till early 1759 when the Durrani rule was re-established. The northern regions of Kohistan and Chitral, inhabited by Dardic peoples, remained outside the Durrani sphere of influence.

Under Timur Shah, the Mughal practice of using Kabul as a summer capital and Peshawar as a winter capital was reintroduced. The Bala Hissar Fort served as the residence of Durrani kings during their winter stay in Peshawar. In 1809, the British sent an emissary to the court of Shah Shujah Durrani in Peshawar, marking the first diplomatic meeting between the British and Durrani rulers.

Ranjit Singh captured Peshawar in 1818, but left it under control of Jahandad Khan in return of paying tribute. In 1823, his armies decisively defeated Azim Khan at the Battle of Nowshera, and he appointed Yar Muhammad Khan as the vassal. From 1826 to 1830 Peshawar became a centre of activities of Syed Ahmad Barelvi, who had declared jihad against the Sikh Empire. Sultan Muhammad Khan rendered valuable services for Ranjit Singh against Ahmed Barelvi, and massacred thousands of his followers in November 1830, forcing Ahmed Barelvi to relocate to Hazara. Ultimately Peshawar was directly annexed by Hari Singh Nalwa in 1834. Shah Shuja Durrani recognised Peshawar as a part of kingdom of Ranjit Singh under the tripartite treaty signed in 1838.

=== British colonial period ===
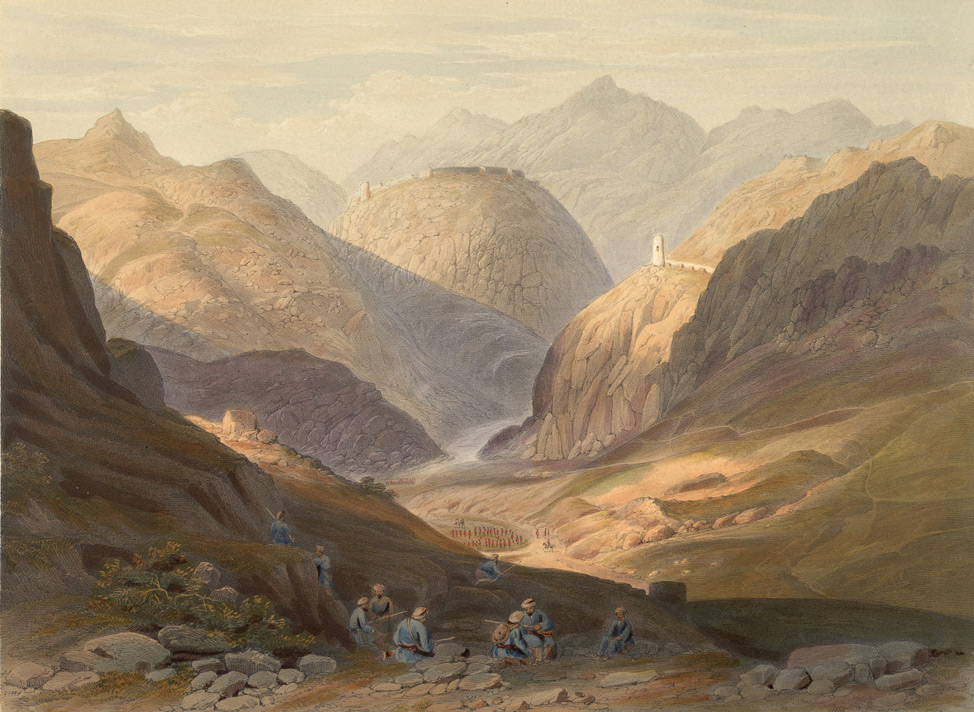
A colonial era lithograph of the Khyber Pass, made in 1848 by James Rattray.

The British East India Company defeated the Sikh Empire in the Second Anglo-Sikh War in 1849, and incorporated western portions of the present-day province into British Raj, which remained part of the Province of Punjab until 1901. During the 1857 war of independence, Pashtun tribes throughout the region were generally neutral or supportive of the British, in contrast to other parts of Raj which rose up in revolt against the British. The British raised 35,000 soldiers from among Pashtun tribes, which proved instrumental in putting down the rebellion.

British had inherited Kohat, Bannu, Peshawar, Hazara, Mardan and Dera Ismail Khan from the Sikh Empire, which they declared settled districts. In the other parts of what would later become North-Western Frontier Province, the British control was tenuous. The defeat of the Kingdom of Kabul in the Second Anglo-Afghan War in 1878 was followed by further expansion of British suzerainty in the tribal areas of Kurram, Waziristan and Khyber. In 1893, the boundary with Afghanistan was finalised under a treaty agreed to by the Afghan king, Abdur Rahman Khan. British awarded parts of Chitral in Asmar, as well as Nuristan, to Afghanistan under the terms of treaty. The Durand treaty also established the Wakhan Corridor, recognised as a part of Afghanistan to act as buffer zone between British and Russian Empire.

In 1895, the British campaign against Chitral resulted in Chitral being formally brought under British suzerainty. In the same year, the colonial government established the Malakand Agency to supervise Chitral as well as the tribes of Swat and Dir. Earlier, these areas had been under the jurisdiction of Gilgit Agency. The tribes of Waziristan rose in rebellion in 1897 against British; the rebellions by Waziris continued to flare up until 1947.

In 1901, North-West Frontier Province was created by separating the five districts of Punjab, namely Peshawar, Kohat, Bannu, Hazara and Dera Ismail Khan, by the colonial government for the administrative ease and supervision of northwestern borders. Following the Third Anglo-Afghan War in 1919, Afghan King Amanullah Khan signed the Treaty of Rawalpindi, in which Afghanistan recognised the Durand Line as official border between the two powers while British recognised sovereignty of Afghanistan.

In 1918, Swat was recognised as a princely state by British Indian government, the last of the princely states to be recognised as such. The British government transferred Indus Kohistan from the Gilgit Agency to NWFP in November 1934.

Concurrently, the British continued their large public works projects in the region, and extended the Great Indian Peninsula Railway into the region, which connected the modern Khyber Pakhtunkhwa region to the plains of India to the east. Other projects, such as the Attock Bridge, Islamia College University, Khyber Railway, and establishment of cantonments in Peshawar, Kohat, Mardan, and Nowshera further cemented British rule in the region.

During colonial period, North-West Frontier Province was a "scene of repeated outrages on Hindus." There were other tensions in the area as well, particularly those that involved agitations by Pashtun tribesmen against the Imperial government. For example, in 1936, a British Indian court ruled against the marriage of a Hindu girl allegedly converted to Islam in Bannu, after the girl's family filed a case of abduction and forced conversion. The ruling was based on the fact that the girl was a minor and was asked to make her decision of conversion and marriage after she reaches the age of majority, till then she was asked to live with a third party. After the girl's family filed a case, the court ruled in the family's favour, angering the local Muslims who had later gone on to lead attacks against the Bannu Brigade. Such controversies stirred up anti-Hindu sentiments amongst the province's Muslim population. By 1947 the majority of the ulama in the province began supporting the Muslim League's idea of Pakistan.

After 1946 elections a Congress-led ministry was established in the province under Khan Abdul Jabbar Khan, a brother of Abdul Ghaffar Khan. The two politicians were opposed to partition of British India. When the partition became inevitable, in June 1947, Khudai Khidmatgars led by Mirzali Khan, Abdul Ghaffar Khan, and other demanded from British government the choice of a separate independent state for Pashtuns, which was refused as the principles laid for their departure required regions under their control to choose either to join India or Pakistan, with no third option.

The 1947 North-West Frontier Province referendum to allow voters to choose between joining India or Pakistan was held on 6 July 1947 and the referendum results were made public on 20 July 1947. According to the official results, there were 572,798 registered voters, out of which 289,244 (99.02%) votes were cast in favour of Pakistan, while 2,874 (0.98%) were cast in favour of India. The referendum was boycotted by Khudai Khidmatgars; their appeal for boycott had an effect, as according to an estimate, the total turnout for the referendum was 15% lower than the total turnout in the 1946 elections, although over half of all eligible voters had voted for Pakistan.

Abdul Ghaffar Khan pledged allegiance to the new state of Pakistan in 1947, and thereafter abandoned his goals of an independent Pashtunistan and a united India in favour of supporting increased autonomy for the NWFP within Pakistan. He was subsequently arrested several times for his opposition to the strong centralized rule. He later claimed that "Pashtunistan was never a reality. The idea of Pashtunistan never helped Pashtuns and it only caused suffering for them." He further claimed that the "successive governments of Afghanistan only exploited the idea for their own political goals".

=== Post-independence ===
After the independence of Pakistan in 1947, Afghanistan was the sole member of the United Nations to vote against Pakistan's accession to the UN because of Kabul's claim to the Pashtun territories on the Pakistani side of the Durand Line. This led to border tensions with Pakistan. Afghanistan's governments have periodically refused to recognize Pakistan's inheritance of past treaties regarding the Pak-Afghan border. During the 1950s, Afghanistan supported the Pashtunistan movement, a secessionist movement that failed to gain substantial support amongst the tribes of the North-West Frontier Province.

After the Afghan-Soviet War, North-West Frontier Province became one of the areas of top focus for the War against Terror. The province was reported to struggle with the social and infrastructure issues even as other parts of the country continue to receive funding.

In 2010, the name of the province changed to "Khyber Pakhtunkhwa". Protests arose among the locals of the Hazara division due to this name change, as they began to demand their own province. Seven people were killed and 100 injured on 11 April 2010 by Khyber Pakhtunkhwa Police to suppress the protests.

The Provincial Assembly of Khyber Pakhtunkhwa approved a bill on 28 May 2018 to merge the FATA as well as the Provincially Administered Tribal Areas into Khyber Pakhtunkhwa following the approval of the Twenty-fifth Amendment to the Constitution of Pakistan by the national legislature; it was signed into law on 31 May by then President of Pakistan Mamnoon Hussain, which officially completed the administrative merger process.

== Geography ==
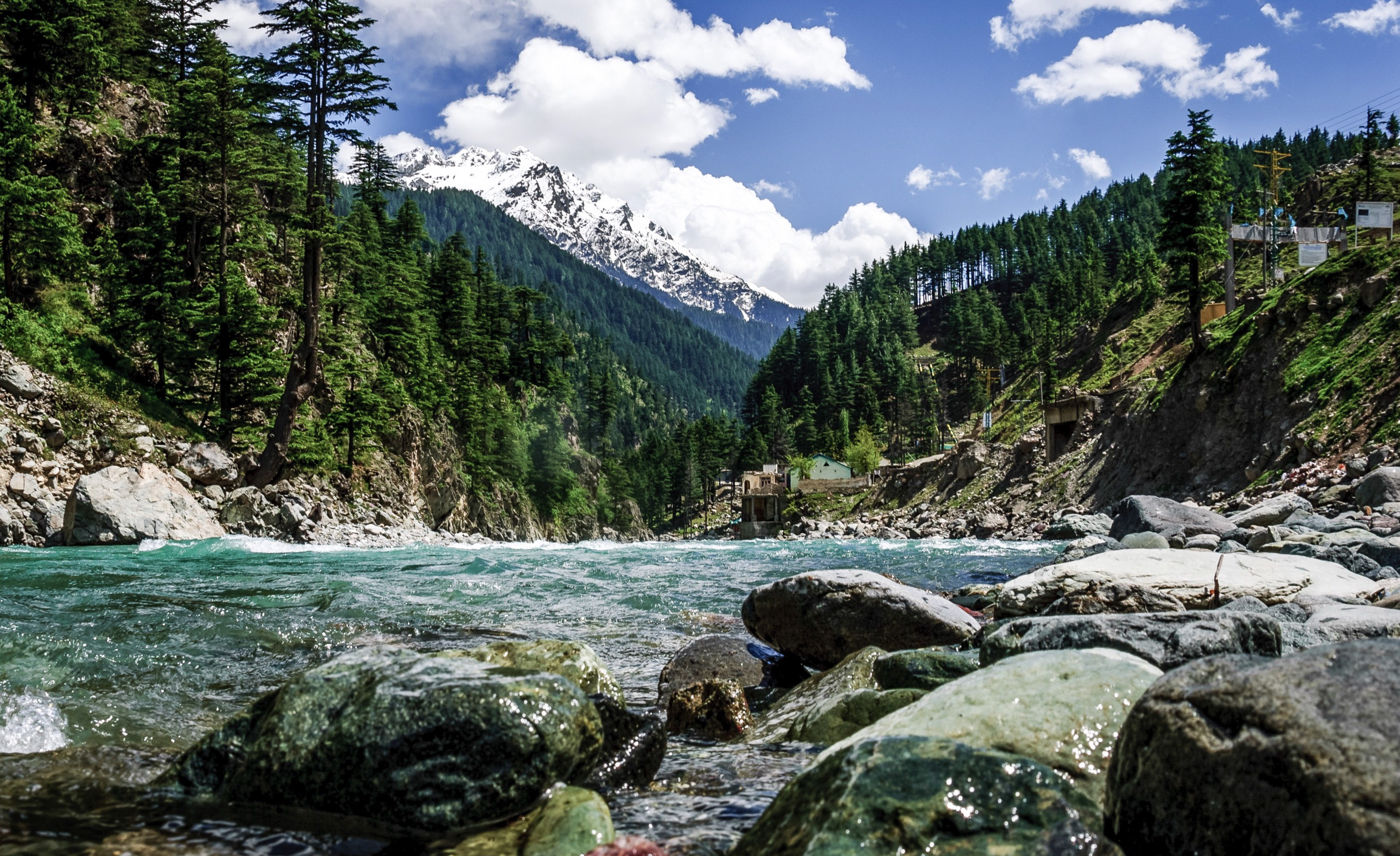
Northern parts of the province feature forests and dramatic mountain scenery, as in Swat District.

Khyber Pakhtunkhwa sits primarily on the Iranian plateau and comprises the junction where the slopes of the Hindu Kush mountains on the Eurasian Plate give way to the Indus-watered hills approaching South Asia. This situation has led to seismic activity in the past. The well-known Khyber Pass links the province to Afghanistan, while the Kohalla Bridge in Circle Bakote Abbottabad is a major crossing point over the Jhelum River in the east.

Geographically the province can be divided into two zones: the northern zone extending from the ranges of the Hindu Kush to the borders of the Peshawar basin and the southern zone extending from Peshawar to the Derajat basin.

The northern zone is cold and snowy in winters with heavy rainfall and pleasant summers with the exception of the Peshawar basin, which is hot in summer and cold in winter. It has moderate rainfall.

The southern zone is arid with hot summers and relatively cold winters and scanty rainfall. The Sheikh Badin Hills, a spur of clay and sandstone hills that stretch east from the Sulaiman Mountains to the Indus River, separates Dera Ismail Khan District from the Marwat plains of the Lakki Marwat. The highest peak in the range is the limestone Sheikh Badin Mountain, which is protected by the Sheikh Badin National Park. Near the Indus River, the terminus of the Sheikh Badin Hills is a spur of limestone hills known as the Kafir Kot hills, where the ancient Hindu complex of Kafir Kot is located.

The major rivers that run in the province are Kabul, Swat, Chitral, Kunar, Siran, Panjkora, Bara, Kurram, Dor, Haroo, Gomal, and Zhob.

=== Climate ===
The climate of Khyber Pakhtunkhwa varies immensely for a region of its size, encompassing most of the many climate types found in Pakistan. The province stretching southwards from the Baroghil Pass in the Hindu Kush covers almost six degrees of latitude; it is mainly a mountainous region. Dera Ismail Khan is one of the hottest places in South Asia while in the mountains to the north the weather is mild in the summer and intensely cold in the winter. The air is generally very dry; consequently, the daily and annual range of temperature is quite large.

Rainfall also varies widely. Although large parts of Khyber Pakhtunkhwa are typically dry, the province also contains the wettest parts of Pakistan in its eastern fringe especially in monsoon season from mid-June to mid-September.

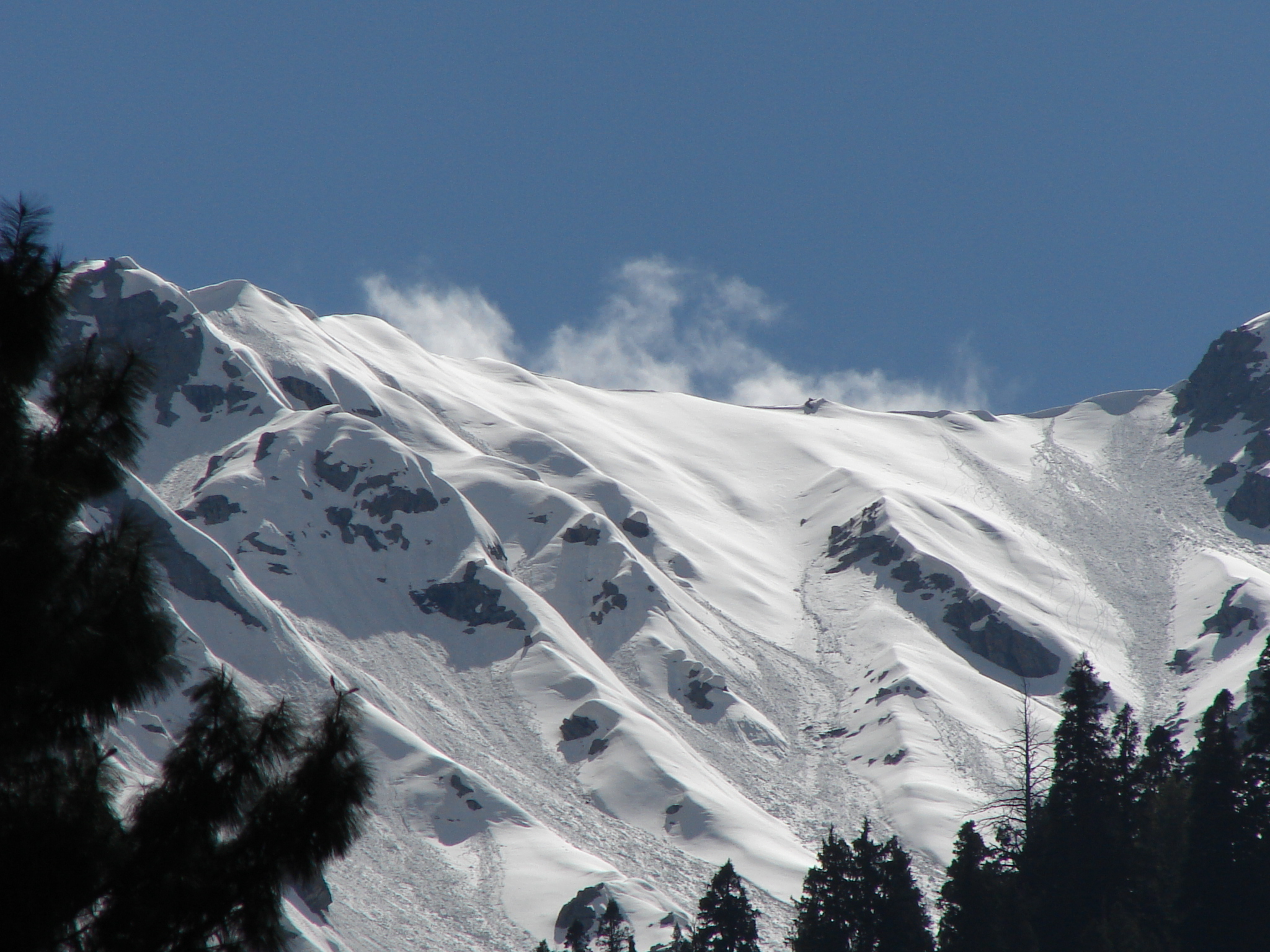
Ghabral, Swat Valley

==== Upper and Lower Chitral Districts ====
Upper Chitral District and Lower Chitral District, due to their location, are completely sheltered from the monsoon that controls the weather in eastern Pakistan, owing to its relatively westerly location and the shielding effect of the Nanga Parbat massif. In many ways, they have more in common regarding climate with Central Asia than South Asia. The winters are generally cold even in the valleys, and heavy snow during the winter blocks passes and isolates the region. In the valleys, however, summers can be hotter than on the windward side of the mountains due to lower cloud cover: Chitral can reach 40 °C (104 °F) frequently during this period. However, the humidity is extremely low during these hot spells and, as a result, the summer climate is less torrid than in the rest of the Indian subcontinent.

Most precipitation falls as thunderstorms or snow during winter and spring, so that the climate at the lowest elevations is classed as Mediterranean (Csa), continental Mediterranean (Dsa) or semi-arid (BSk). Summers are extremely dry in the north of Chitral district and receive only a little rain in the south around Drosh.

At elevations above 5,000 metres (16,400 ft), as much as a third of the snow which feeds the large Karakoram and Hindukush glaciers comes from the monsoon since these elevations are too high to be shielded from its moisture.

==== Central Khyber Pakhtunkhwa ====
Dir

Climate chart (precipitation, max. and min. temperature)
J	F	M	A	M	J	J	A	S	O	N	D
121 11 −3	177 12 −2	254 16 3	166 23 8	86 28 12	54 32 16	160 31 19	169 30 18	84 29 14	50 25 7	58 20 2	83 14 −1
- █ Average max. and min. temperatures in °C
- █ Precipitation totals in mm
- Source: World Climate Data
Imperial conversion
J	F	M	A	M	J	J	A	S	O	N	D
4.8 52 27	7 54 28	10 61 37	6.5 73 46	3.4 82 54	2.1 90 61	6.3 88 66	6.7 86 64	3.3 84 57	2 77 45	2.3 68 36	3.3 57 30
- █ Average max. and min. temperatures in °F
- █ Precipitation totals in inches

On the southern flanks of Nanga Parbat and in Upper and Lower Dir Districts, rainfall is much heavier than further north because moist winds from the Arabian Sea are able to penetrate the region. When they collide with the mountain slopes, winter depressions provide heavy precipitation. The monsoon, although short, is generally powerful. As a result, the southern slopes of Khyber Pakhtunkhwa are the wettest part of Pakistan. Annual rainfall ranges from around 500 millimetres (20 in) in the most sheltered areas to as much as 1,750 millimetres (69 in) in parts of Abbottabad and Mansehra Districts.

This region's climate is classed at lower elevations as humid subtropical (Cfa in the west; Cwa in the east); whilst at higher elevations with a southerly aspect, it becomes classed as humid continental (Dfb). However, accurate data for altitudes above 2,000 metres (6,560 ft) are practically nonexistent here, in Chitral, or in the south of the province.

Dera Ismail Khan

Climate chart (precipitation, max. and min. temperature)
J	F	M	A	M	J	J	A	S	O	N	D
10 20 4	18 22 7	35 27 13	22 34 19	17 39 23	14 42 27	61 39 27	58 37 26	18 37 24	5 33 17	2 28 11	10 22 5
- █ Average max. and min. temperatures in °C
- █ Precipitation totals in mm
- Source: World Climate Data
Imperial conversion
J	F	M	A	M	J	J	A	S	O	N	D
0.4 68 39	0.7 72 45	1.4 81 55	0.9 93 66	0.7 102 73	0.6 108 81	2.4 102 81	2.3 99 79	0.7 99 75	0.2 91 63	0.1 82 52	0.4 72 41
- █ Average max. and min. temperatures in °F
- █ Precipitation totals in inches

The seasonality of rainfall in central Khyber Pakhtunkhwa shows very marked gradients from east to west. At Dir, March remains the wettest month due to frequent frontal cloud bands, whereas in Hazara more than half the rainfall comes from the monsoon. This creates a unique situation characterized by a bimodal rainfall regime, which extends into the southern part of the province described below.

Since cold air from the Siberian High loses its chilling capacity upon crossing the vast Karakoram and Himalaya ranges, winters in central Khyber Pakhtunkhwa are somewhat milder than in Chitral. Snow remains very frequent at high altitudes but rarely lasts long on the ground in the major towns and agricultural valleys. Outside of winter, temperatures in central Khyber Pakhtunkhwa are not so hot as in Chitral.

Significantly higher humidity when the monsoon is active means that heat discomfort can be greater. However, even during the most humid periods the high altitudes typically allow for some relief from the heat overnight.

==== Southern Khyber Pakhtunkhwa ====
As one moves further away from the foothills of the Himalaya and Karakoram ranges, the climate changes from the humid subtropical climate of the foothills to the typically arid climate of Sindh, Balochistan and southern Punjab. As in central Khyber Pakhtunkhwa, the seasonality of precipitation shows a very sharp gradient from west to east, but the whole region very rarely receives significant monsoon rainfall. Even at high elevations, annual rainfall is less than 400 millimetres (16 in) and in some places as little as 200 millimetres (8 in).

Temperatures in southern Khyber Pakhtunkhwa are extremely hot: Dera Ismail Khan in the southernmost district of the province is known as one of the hottest places in the world with temperatures known to have reached 50 °C (122 °F). In the cooler months, nights can be cold and frosts remain frequent; snow is very rare, and daytime temperatures remain comfortably warm with abundant sunshine.

=== National parks ===
There are about 37 national parks in Pakistan, 8 out of these are in Khyber Pakhtunkhwa.

Name	Photo	Location	Date established	Area (Hec)	Key wildlife
Ayubia National Park		Abbottabad District	1984	3,122	Indian leopard, Leopard cat, Yellow-throated marten, Asian palm civet, Masked palm civet, Rhesus macaque, Red giant flying squirrel, Koklass pheasant and Kalij pheasant
Chitral Gol National Park		Lower Chitral District	1984	7,750	Markhor, Urial, Snow leopard, Persian leopard, Himalayan lynx, Himalayan brown bear, Chukar partridge, Snow partridge, Himalayan snowcock and Himalayan black bear
Broghil Valley National Park		Upper Chitral District	2010	134,744	Siberian ibex, Himalayan musk deer, Himalayan brown bear and Long-tailed marmot
Sheikh Badin National Park		Dera Ismail Khan District	1999	15,540	Persian leopard, Indian wolf, Bengal fox, Urial, Markhor, Chukar partridge, Indian boar, Black francolin and Grey francolin
Saiful Muluk National Park		Mansehra District	2003	12,026	Himalayan black bear, Yellow-throated marten, Masked palm civet, Himalayan goral, Himalayan musk deer, Siberian ibex, Himalayan monal and Cheer pheasant
Lulusar-Dudipatsar National Park		Mansehra District	2003	75,058	Persian leopard, Yellow-throated marten, Himalayan black bear, Siberian ibex, Himalayan goral, Himalayan monal and Western tragopan

== Demographics ==
=== Population ===
Historical population
Year	Pop.	±%
1855	1,209,736	—
1868	1,718,200	+42.0%
1881	1,955,515	+13.8%
1891	2,281,708	+16.7%
1901	2,125,480	−6.8%
1911	3,819,027	+79.7%
1921	5,076,476	+32.9%
1931	4,684,364	−7.7%
1941	5,415,666	+15.6%
1951	5,899,905	+8.9%
1961	7,599,627	+28.8%
1972	10,879,781	+43.2%
1981	13,259,875	+21.9%
1998	20,919,976	+57.8%
2017	35,501,964	+69.7%
2023	40,856,097	+15.1%

The province is home to 16.9 percent of Pakistan's total population. It had a population of 40.9 million at the time of the 2023 Census of Pakistan. About 85% of the population lived in rural areas.

As per a 2025 Dawn News report, based on data compiled by research organisation Population Council, UK Aid and the United Nations Population, Khyber Pakhtunkhwa had an annual growth rate of 2.38%. According to demographic projections, if the province’s current total fertility rate of 4 children per woman remains unchanged, Khyber Pakhtunkhwa's population could reach approximately 78 million by 2050.

Divisions of Khyber Pakhtunkhwa
Division	Population 2023 Census	Population 2017 Census	Population 1998 Census	Area (km^{2})	Capital
Peshawar	10,035,171	7,403,817	3,923,588	9,134	Peshawar
Malakand	9,959,399	7,514,694	4,262,700	31,162	Saidu Sharif
Hazara	6,188,736	5,325,121	3,505,581	17,064	Abbottabad
Mardan	4,639,498	3,997,677	2,486,904	3,175	Mardan
Kohat	3,752,436	2,218,971	1,307,969	12,377	Kohat
Dera Ismail Khan	3,188,779	2,019,017	1,091,211	18,854	Dera Ismail Khan
Bannu	3,092,078	2,044,074	1,165,692	9,975	Bannu

=== Ethnicity ===
Khyber Pakhtunkhwa is one of Pakistan's most diverse provinces. It is home to numerous ethnolinguistic and ethnic groups that live across different parts of KPK. Four main ethnolinguistic groups of Khyber Pakhtunkhwa are Pashtuns, Hindkowans, Saraikis and Kohistanis. One-third of the province's population is non-Pashtun and mainly concentrated in the northern areas.

==== Main ethnic groups ====
- Pashtun: The largest ethnic group in Khyber Pakhtunkhwa is the Pashtuns. They predominantly speak Pashto as their mother tongue and are found throughout the province. The Pashtuns of KPK observe tribal code of conduct called Pashtunwali which has four high value components called nang (honour), badal (revenge), melmastiya (hospitality) and nanawata (rights to refuge).
- Awan: They are mainly found in Hazara division and speak Hindko as their mother tongue. They are the second main ethnic group and are mainly found in Hazara division of Khyber Pakhtunkhwa.
- Gujjar: They are mainly found in the Hazara, Mardan, Peshawar, and Malakand divisions. They are the third main ethnic group of Khyber Pakhtunkhwa and speak Pashto, Gujari, and Hindko as their mother tongues. Some Gujars in Chitral also speak 'Khowar' as their mother tongue.
- Jat (Jutt): They are mainly found in the Dera Ismail Khan division of Khyber Pakhtunkhwa and they speak Saraiki as their mother tongue.
- Kohistanis: They are a group of people mainly found in Kohistan region, as well as in the Swat and Chitral valleys. They are primarily include Gawri, Torwali, Bateri, and Indus Kohistanis communities, who speak their own dialect of the Kohistani languages.

==== Other ethnic groups ====
- Kho people: They are mainly found in Upper and Lower Chitral Districts of Khyber Pakhtunkhwa and Kohistan region. They speak their own Khowar language.
- Shina: They mainly found in Kohistan region of Khyber Pakhtunkhwa and speak Shina language.
- Kalasha: They are a non-Muslim indigenous tribe mainly found in three Kalasha valleys of Upper Chitral district of Khyber Pakhtunkhwa. They speak their own Kalasha language.
- Other minority groups: Khyber Pakhtunkhwa is also to other minority groups. These include Syeds, Tanaolis, Dhunds, Mallliars, Balochs, Rajputs, Sheikhhs, Kharrals, Mughals, Qureshis, Baghbans, Parachas, Kassabs, and Gakhars. There are also various Muslim artisan castes, inducing Tarkhan, Julaha, Mochi, Lohar, Kumhar, Sonar and Teli.

In the districts of Abbottabad, Haripur and Mansehra Hindkowans also known as Hazarewals, reside. They also form a significant urban population in the cities of Peshawar and Kohat, although their historical influence has weakened in recent decades due to the rural to urban migration and the influx of Afghans.

==== Refugees ====
As per 2026 UNHCR report, around 374,922 Afghan refugees remain in the province. They are registered as citizens of Afghanistan, despite having been born and raised in Pakistan for decades. Majority of them are ethnic Pashtuns and Tajiks.

=== Languages ===
Languages of Khyber Pakhtunkhwa (2023 Census)
1. Pashto (81.0%)
2. Hindko (9.39%)
3. Saraiki (3.17%)
4. Kohistani (2.45%)
5. Urdu (0.64%)
6. Punjabi (0.24%)
7. Shina (0.17%)
8. Others (2.94%)

According to the 2023 census, the most widely spoken language is Pashto, native to 81% of the population and spoken throughout the province. Other main languages include Hindko spoken by 9.39%, Saraiki by 3.17%, and Kohistani languages by 2.45%.

Urdu is spoken by 0.64%, Punjabi by 0.24%, and Shina by 0.17% of the population. Hindko is primarily spoken in the Hazara Division in the northeast, and Saraiki-speakers are found in Dera Ismail Khan and Tank districts in the far south of the province. Punjabi is mainly spoken in Hazara division, as well as in the cities of Nowshera, Peshawar, and Kohat. Kohistani languages are mainly spoken in Kohistan region and Upper Swat district. Gujari language is spoken in all major cities of Khyber Pakhtunkhwa and in the northern half of the province. Shina is mainly spoken in Kohistan region, while Khowar is spoken in Upper and Lower Chitral Districts.

Urdu, the national and official language, serves as a lingua franca. It is used as a common language between different ethnic groups. In communities that speak other indigenous languages, people often use Pashto and Urdu as their second and third languages.

Kohistani languages is an umbrella term encompassing several languages spoken in the north of the province, including Indus Kohistani, Bateri, Chilisso, Gawri, Gawro, Torwali, and Mankiyali. In 2011 the provincial government approved in principle the introduction of Pashto, Saraiki, Hindko, Khowar and Kohistani as compulsory subjects for schools in the areas where they are spoken.

==== Other languages ====
Around 1 million people selected the "Other" category, as most of these languages were not listed in the census. Other languages make up 2.94% of Khyber Pakhtunkhwa including Gujari and Khowar. Gujari language, along with Burushaski, Wakhi, and Kalkoti is spoken by 1% of the population. Gujari is spoken in all major cities and the northern half of Khyber Pakhtunkhwa, while others are spoken near border areas of Gilgit-Baltistan. Khowar, along with Kalasha, Phalura, Dameli, Gawar-Bati, Balti, Yidgha, and Shekhai, is spoken by 1% of the population, mainly in the Upper and Lower Chitral Districts.

Remaining 0.94% speak other minority languages. The Afghans in Pakistan speak mainly Pashto among each other. Some speak Dari, Hazaragi, and Tajik, which are dialects of Persian.

Language in Khyber Pakhtunkhwa (1881–2023)
Mother Tongue	1881		1891		1901		1911		1921		1931		1951		2017		2023	
Mother Tongue	Pop.	%	Pop.	%	Pop.	%	Pop.	%	Pop.	%	Pop.	%	Pop.	%	Pop.	%	Pop.	%
Greater Punjabi (Note: Punjabi languages and dialects amalgamated for comparative purposes, as they were previously enumerated jointly as Punjabi languages and dialects. Includes speakers of Western Punjabi (Lahnda) (Hindko-Saraiki: Peshawari, Pahari-Pothwari, Derawali, Chinawab, Multani, Chachhi, Ghebi, Tanoli, Kohati, Awankari, Hariani, and others) and also includes speakers of Standard Punjabi. Both are included as one on table for continuity between censuses, as enumeration results frequently shifted as standardization of the various Punjabi dialects and languages was an ongoing process, with speakers of Standard Punjabi comprising a majority as per the 1911 census, while speakers of Western Punjabi (Lahnda) comprised a majority as per the 1921 and 1931 census.)	1,050,061	53.7%	1,226,648	53.76%	876,604	42.75%	916,365	41.71%	1,000,255	44.43%	1,102,905	45.48%	1,008,434	24.54%	4,820,336	13.58%	5,203,012	12.73%
Pashto	870,816	44.53%	1,023,021	44.84%	1,088,606	53.08%	1,221,859	55.62%	1,202,326	53.4%	1,279,471	52.76%	2,875,751	69.98%	28,363,363	79.89%	32,919,592	80.57%
Urdu (Note: Previously also enumerated as Hindi or Hindustani.)	17,645	0.9%	15,686	0.69%	15,598	0.76%	16,995	0.77%	8,814	0.39%	19,221	0.79%	50,409	1.23%	298,319	0.84%	259,925	0.64%
English	4,554	0.23%	5,204	0.23%	4,601	0.22%	5,720	0.26%	9,762	0.43%	7,852	0.32%	125	0%	—N/a	—N/a	—N/a	—N/a
Persian	4,028	0.21%	3,962	0.17%	2,851	0.14%	3,454	0.16%	2,352	0.1%	6,030	0.25%	4,422	0.11%	—N/a	—N/a	—N/a	—N/a
Kashmiri	3,736	0.19%	2,218	0.1%	821	0.04%	533	0.02%	343	0.02%	1,796	0.07%	—N/a	—N/a	46,084	0.13%	6,471	0.02%
Balochi	2,510	0.13%	554	0.02%	92	0%	—N/a	—N/a	—N/a	—N/a	—N/a	—N/a	4	0%	27,846	0.08%	30,636	0.07%
Nepali	1,020	0.05%	2,655	0.12%	—N/a	—N/a	5,179	0.24%	4,149	0.18%	5,140	0.21%	—N/a	—N/a	—N/a	—N/a	—N/a	—N/a
Dogri	624	0.03%	336	0.01%	674	0.03%	46	0%	—N/a	—N/a	—N/a	—N/a	—N/a	—N/a	—N/a	—N/a	—N/a	—N/a
Sindhi	204	0.01%	101	0%	196	0.01%	—N/a	—N/a	7	0%	—N/a	—N/a	23	0%	32,134	0.09%	10,019	0.02%
Bengali	202	0.01%	106	0%	—N/a	—N/a	—N/a	—N/a	217	0.01%	—N/a	—N/a	900	0.02%	—N/a	—N/a	—N/a	—N/a
Balti	38	0%	—N/a	—N/a	—N/a	—N/a	—N/a	—N/a	—N/a	—N/a	—N/a	—N/a	—N/a	—N/a	—N/a	—N/a	858	0%
Gujarati	16	0%	282	0.01%	—N/a	—N/a	97	0%	11	0%	—N/a	—N/a	—N/a	—N/a	—N/a	—N/a	—N/a	—N/a
Marathi	1	0%	61	0%	—N/a	—N/a	219	0.01%	1	0%	—N/a	—N/a	—N/a	—N/a	—N/a	—N/a	—N/a	—N/a
Chitrali (Khowar–Kalasha)	—N/a	—N/a	7	0%	1	0%	41	0%	—N/a	—N/a	—N/a	—N/a	97,489	2.37%	—N/a	—N/a	5,632	0.01%
Rajasthani (Note: Includes Gujari, Odki, Marwari, and Mewati.)	—N/a	—N/a	—N/a	—N/a	53,329	2.6%	25,812	1.17%	22,637	1.01%	596	0.02%	—N/a	—N/a	—N/a	—N/a	93	0%
Kohistani	—N/a	—N/a	—N/a	—N/a	—N/a	—N/a	117	0.01%	222	0.01%	377	0.02%	65,647	1.6%	—N/a	—N/a	996,182	2.44%
Brahui	—N/a	—N/a	—N/a	—N/a	—N/a	—N/a	—N/a	—N/a	—N/a	—N/a	—N/a	—N/a	—N/a	—N/a	70,357	0.2%	1,570	0%
Shina	—N/a	—N/a	—N/a	—N/a	—N/a	—N/a	—N/a	—N/a	—N/a	—N/a	—N/a	—N/a	—N/a	—N/a	—N/a	—N/a	70,140	0.17%
Others	60	0%	867	0.04%	7,351	0.36%	496	0.02%	244	0.01%	1,688	0.07%	1,408	0.03%	1,843,525	5.19%	1,136,990	2.78%
Total responses	1,955,515	100%	2,281,708	100%	2,050,724	96.48%	2,196,933	57.53%	2,251,340	44.35%	2,425,076	51.77%	4,109,398	69.65%	35,501,964	100%	40,641,120	99.47%
Total population	1,955,515	100%	2,281,708	100%	2,125,480	100%	3,819,027	100%	5,076,476	100%	4,684,364	100%	5,899,905	100%	35,501,964	100%	40,856,097	100%
Note1: 1881, 1891, 1901, 1911, 1921, and 1931 census populations for language data is for North-West Frontier Province only (Peshawar District, Dera Ismail Khan District, Hazara District, Bannu District, and Kohat District) and excludes the Federally Administered Tribal Areas (both administrative divisions later merged to form Khyber Pakhtunkhwa in 2018), as linguistic data was not collected in the latter region at the time. Note2: 1951 census populations include all of North-West Frontier Province and some enumerated populations of the Federally Administered Tribal Areas.

=== Religion ===
Religion in Khyber Pakhtunkhwa (2023 Census)
Religion	Percent
Islam	99.62%
Christianity	0.33%
Hinduism	0.02%
Others	0.03%

The overwhelming majority of the residents of the Khyber Pakhtunkhwa follows and professes Sunni Islam while there is a significant amount of Shia Muslims in areas such as Kurram, Kohat, Hangu, Orakzai, Dera Ismail Khan, Mardan, and many other districts throughout central-southern KPK. Apart from Twelver Shias there are Isma'ilis in the Chitral district. The tribe of Kalasha in southern Chitral still retain an ancient form of Polytheism mixed with Animism, a faith once dominant in the mountainous upper northeast of the district. There are a small numbers of residents who are adherents of the Roman Catholic denomination of Christianity, Hinduism, and Sikhism, mainly living in Peshawar and other urban centres.

Religion in Khyber Pakhtunkhwa (1855–2023)
Religious group	1855		1868		1881		1891		1901		1911		1921		1931		1941		1951		1961		1972		1981		1998		2017		2023	
Religious group	Pop.	%	Pop.	%	Pop.	%	Pop.	%	Pop.	%	Pop.	%	Pop.	%	Pop.	%	Pop.	%	Pop.	%	Pop.	%	Pop.	%	Pop.	%	Pop.	%	Pop.	%	Pop.	%
Islam	1,099,134 (Note: At the time of enumeration, only two religious categories broadly existed, including one response for Dharmic faiths, referred to as Hindoo; the other category included one response for Abrahamic and other faiths, referred to as Mahomedan and others non Hindoo.)	90.86%	1,563,061	90.97%	1,787,341	91.4%	2,088,015	91.51%	1,890,479	92.19%	2,039,994	92.86%	2,062,786	91.62%	2,227,303	91.84%	2,788,797	91.8%	5,858,080	99.89%	7,569,026	99.88%	7,998,232	99.58%	13,194,345	99.51%	20,808,480	99.47%	35,428,857	99.79%	40,486,153	99.62%
Christianity	—N/a	—N/a	3,801	0.22%	4,725	0.24%	5,437	0.24%	5,119	0.25%	6,585	0.3%	10,610	0.47%	12,213	0.5%	10,889	0.36%	3,823	0.07%	7,463	0.1%	12,828	0.16%	44,514	0.34%	38,974	0.19%	50,018	0.14%	134,884	0.33%
Hinduism (Note: 1951, 1961, 1972, 1981, 1998, 2017, 2023: Including Jāti (Castes) and Scheduled Castes.)	110,602	9.14%	141,441 (Note: Including total Chamar & Chuhra populations, enumerated separately during the 1868 census.)	8.23%	154,081	7.88%	166,984	7.32%	129,306	6.31%	119,942	5.46%	149,881	6.66%	142,977	5.9%	180,321	5.94%	2,432	0.04%	1,474	0.02%	5,014	0.06%	5,253	0.04%	7,011	0.03%	6,373	0.02%	6,102	0.02%
Sikhism	—N/a	—N/a	6,904	0.4%	9,205	0.47%	21,110	0.93%	25,733	1.25%	30,345	1.38%	28,040	1.25%	42,510	1.75%	57,939	1.91%	—N/a	—N/a	—N/a	—N/a	—N/a	—N/a	729	0.01%	—N/a	—N/a	—N/a	—N/a	4,050	0.01%
Jainism	—N/a	—N/a	52	0.003%	106	0.01%	108	0.005%	37	0.002%	4	0%	3	0%	0	0%	1	0%	—N/a	—N/a	—N/a	—N/a	—N/a	—N/a	—N/a	—N/a	—N/a	—N/a	—N/a	—N/a	—N/a	—N/a
Zoroastrianism	—N/a	—N/a	—N/a	—N/a	52	0.003%	48	0.002%	46	0.002%	49	0.002%	20	0.001%	60	0.002%	24	0.001%	—N/a	—N/a	10	0%	39	0%	462	0.003%	—N/a	—N/a	—N/a	—N/a	36	0%
Buddhism	—N/a	—N/a	—N/a	—N/a	0	0%	0	0%	0	0%	0	0%	0	0%	2	0%	25	0.001%	—N/a	—N/a	4	0%	77	0.001%	58	0%	—N/a	—N/a	—N/a	—N/a	—N/a	—N/a
Judaism	—N/a	—N/a	—N/a	—N/a	—N/a	—N/a	4	0%	4	0%	14	0.001%	0	0%	11	0%	71	0.002%	—N/a	—N/a	—N/a	—N/a	—N/a	—N/a	—N/a	—N/a	—N/a	—N/a	—N/a	—N/a	—N/a	—N/a
Ahmadiyya	—N/a	—N/a	—N/a	—N/a	—N/a	—N/a	—N/a	—N/a	—N/a	—N/a	—N/a	—N/a	—N/a	—N/a	—N/a	—N/a	—N/a	—N/a	—N/a	—N/a	—N/a	—N/a	—N/a	—N/a	12,333	0.09%	48,703	0.23%	7,204	0.02%	951	0.002%
Others	—N/a	—N/a	2,941	0.17%	5	0%	2	0%	0	0%	0	0%	0	0%	0	0%	0	0%	215	0.004%	209	0.003%	16,134	0.2%	2,181	0.02%	16,808	0.08%	9,512	0.03%	8,944	0.02%
Total Responses (Note: Total responses during all colonial–era (1855, 1868, 1881, 1891, 1901, 1911, 1921, 1931, and 1941) census counts are an amalgamation of all the districts of North-West Frontier Province at the time, including Hazara, Mardan, Peshawar, Kohat, Bannu, and Dera Ismail Khan. Religious affiliation was not enumerated in the Federally Administered Tribal Areas and former princely states of Amb, Chitral, Dir, Phulra and Swat during all colonial–era census counts. Religious affiliation was not enumerated in the Federally Administered Tribal Areas during one modern–era census count (1972). Total responses in all other modern–era (1951, 1961, 1981, 1998, 2017, 2023) census counts are an amalgamation of the North-West Frontier Province and Federally Administered Tribal Areas. Both administrative divisions would ultimately merge to form Khyber Pakhtunkhwa in 2018.)	1,209,736	100%	1,718,200	100%	1,955,515	100%	2,281,708	100%	2,050,724	96.48%	2,196,933	57.53%	2,251,340	44.35%	2,425,076	51.77%	3,038,067	56.1%	5,864,550 (Note: Excluding 35,355 persons claiming Nationalities other than Pakistani.)	99.4%	7,578,186 (Note: Excluding 21,441 persons claiming Nationalities other than Pakistani.)	99.72%	8,032,324	73.83%	13,259,875	100%	20,919,976	100%	35,501,964	100%	40,641,120	99.47%
Total Population	1,209,736	100%	1,718,200	100%	1,955,515	100%	2,281,708	100%	2,125,480	100%	3,819,027	100%	5,076,476	100%	4,684,364	100%	5,415,666	100%	5,899,905	100%	7,599,627	100%	10,879,781	100%	13,259,875	100%	20,919,976	100%	35,501,964	100%	40,856,097	100%
Note 1: Total responses during all colonial–era (1855, 1868, 1881, 1891, 1901, 1911, 1921, 1931, and 1941) census counts amalgamate all districts of North-West Frontier Province at the time, including Hazara, Mardan, Peshawar, Kohat, Bannu, and Dera Ismail Khan. All colonial–era census counts did not enumerate religious affiliation in the Federally Administered Tribal Areas alongside Amb, Chitral, Dir, Phulra and Swat princely states. Note 2: Religious affiliation was not enumerated in the Federally Administered Tribal Areas during one modern–era census count (1972). Total responses in all other modern–era (1951, 1961, 1981, 1998, 2017, 2023) census counts are an amalgamation of the North-West Frontier Province and Federally Administered Tribal Areas. Both administrative divisions would ultimately merge to form Khyber Pakhtunkhwa in 2018.

== Government and politics ==
=== Political leanings and the legislative branch ===
In rural areas of Khyber Pakhtunkhwa, especially in the west and south, people often vote based on tribe, biradari, or family connections rather that political party policies. This is called vertical alignment. Horizontal alignment means people support a party because of its ideology. Pashtuns dominant local politics of Khyber Pakhtunkhwa. Other groups such as Sayeds, Gujjars, and Swatis are influential in the local politics of Malakand and Hazara divisions. Awan, Abbasi and Tanoli are also politically influential in the Hazara division. In Mansehra District, tribal leaders won the National Assembly seats in the 1990, 1993, and 1997 elections. There was also competition between Gurjars and Sayeds. Because Gurjars had a larger population, the Pakistan Muslim League – Nawaz gave the election ticket to a Gujjars leader, who then won the seat.

The Provincial Assembly is a unicameral legislature, which consists of 145 members elected to serve for a constitutionally bounded term of five years. Historically, the province perceived to be a stronghold of the Awami National Party (ANP); a pro-Russian, by procommunist, left-wing and nationalist party. Since the 1970s, the Pakistan Peoples Party (PPP) also enjoyed considerable support in the province due to its socialist agenda. Khyber Pakhtunkhwa was thought to be another leftist region of the country after Sindh.

After the nationwide general elections held in 2002, a plurality voting swing in the province elected one of Pakistan's only religiously based provincial governments led by the ultra-conservative Muttahida Majlis-e-Amal (MMA) during the administration of President Pervez Musharraf. The American involvement in neighbouring Afghanistan contributed towards the electoral victory of the Islamic coalition led by Jamaat-e-Islami Pakistan (JeI) whose social policies made the province a ground-swell of anti-Americanism. The electoral victory of MMA was also in context of guided democracy in the Musharraff administration that barred the mainstream political parties, the leftist Pakistan Peoples Party and the centre-right Pakistan Muslim League (N) (PML(N)), whose chairmen and presidents having been barred from participation in the elections.

Policy enforcement of a range of social restrictions, though the implementation of strict Shariah was introduced by the Muttahida Majlis-e-Amal government. But the law was never fully enacted due to objections of the Governor of Khyber Pakhtunkhwa backed by the Musharraf administration. Restrictions on public musical performances were introduced, as well as a ban prohibiting music to be played in public places as part of the "Prohibition of Dancing and Music Bill, 2005" – which led to the creation of a thriving underground music scene in Peshawar. The Islamist government also attempted to enforce compulsory hijab on women, and wished to enforce gender segregation in the province's educational institutions. The coalition further tried to prohibit male doctors from performing ultrasounds on women, and tried to close the province's cinemas. In 2005, the coalition successfully passed the "Prohibition of Use of Women in Photograph Bill, 2005," leading to the removal of all public advertisements that featured women.

At the height of Taliban insurgency in Pakistan, the religious coalition lost its grip in the general elections held in 2008, and the religious coalition was swept out of power by the leftist Awami National Party which also witnessed the resignation of President Musharraf in 2008. The ANP government eventually led the initiatives to repeal the major Islamist's social programs, with the backing of the federal government led by PPP in Islamabad. Public disapproval of ANP's leftist program integrated in civil administration with the sounded allegations of corruption as well as popular opposition against religious program promoted by the MMA swiftly shifted the province's leniency away from the left in 2012. In 2013, the provincial politics shifted towards populism and nationalism when the PTI, led by Imran Khan, was able to form the minority government in coalition with the JeI; the province now serves as the stronghold of the PTI and is perceived as one of the more right wing areas of the country. After the 2018 election, PTI increased their seat share and formed a majority government.

In non-Pashtun areas, such as Abbottabad, and Hazara Division, the PML(N), the centre-right party, enjoys considerable public support over economical and public policy issues and has a substantial vote bank.

=== Executive branch ===
The executive branch of the Kyber Pakhtunkhwa is led by the Chief Minister elected by popular vote in the Provincial assembly while the Governor, a ceremonial figure representing the federal government in Islamabad, is appointed from the necessary advice of the Prime Minister of Pakistan by the President of Pakistan.

The provincial cabinet is then appointed by the Chief Minister who takes the Oath of office from the Governor. In matters of civil administration, the Chief Secretary assists the Chief Minister on executing its right to ensure the writ of the government and the constitution.

=== Judicial branch ===
The Peshawar High Court is the province's highest court of law whose judges are appointed by the approval of the Supreme Judicial Council in Islamabad, interpreting the laws and overturn those they find unconstitutional.

=== Administrative divisions and districts ===
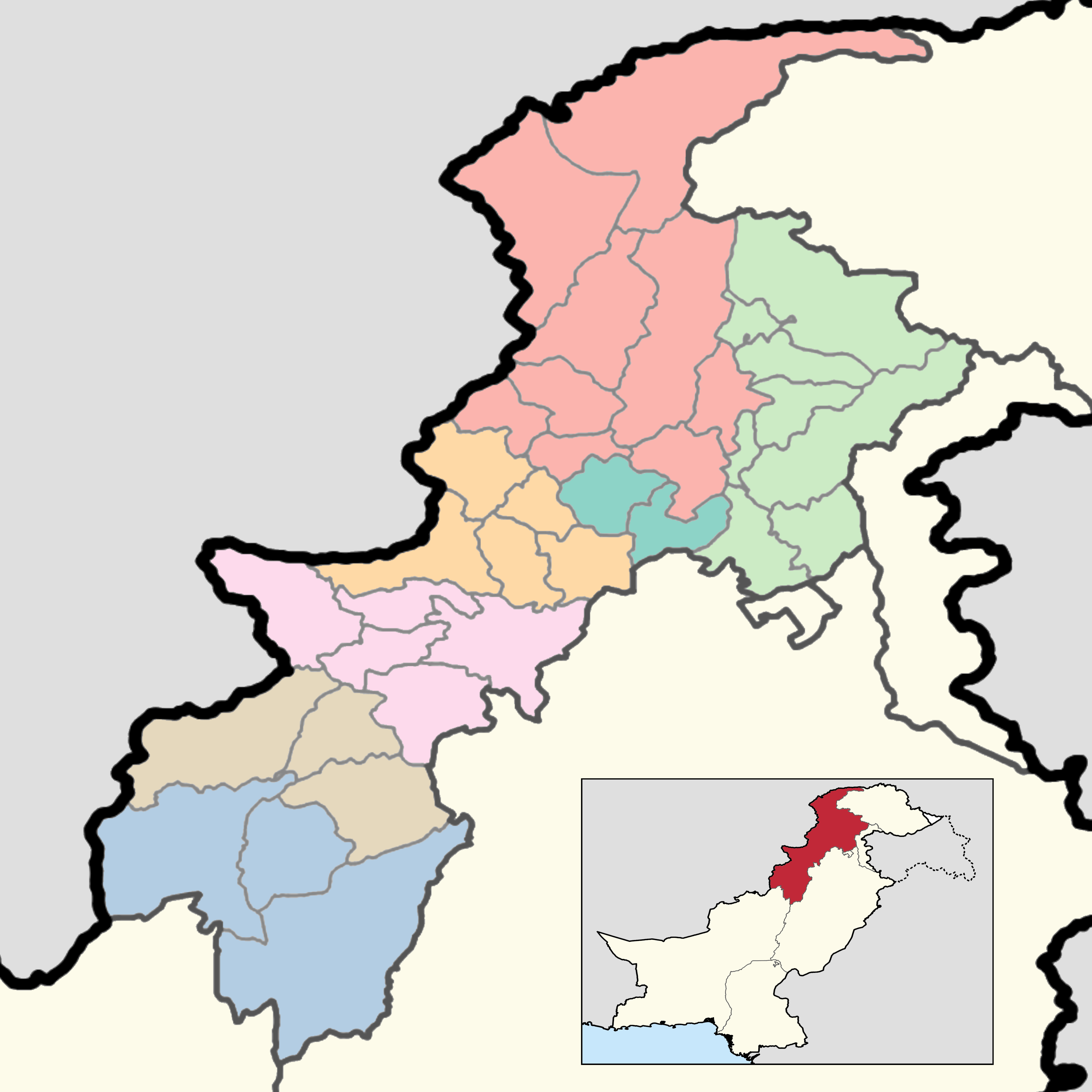
The various divisions of Khyber Pakhtunkhwa. From the top-right: Light green: Hazara division Red: Malakand division Teal: Mardan division Orange: Peshawar division Pink: Kohat division Brown: Bannu division Blue: Dera Ismail Khan division

Khyber Pakhtunkhwa is divided into seven divisions – Bannu, Dera Ismail Khan, Hazara, Kohat, Malakand, Mardan, and Peshawar. Each division is split up into anywhere between two and nine districts, and there are 38 districts in the entire province. Following is a list showing each district ordered by alphabetical order. A full list showing different characteristics of each district, such as their population, area, and a map showing their location can be found at the main article.

- Abbottabad District
- Allai District
- Bajaur District
- Bannu District
- Battagram District
- Buner District
- Charsadda District
- Central Dir District
- Dera Ismail Khan District
- Hangu District
- Haripur District
- Karak District
- Khyber District
- Kohat District
- Kolai-Palas District
- Kurram District
- Lakki Marwat District
- Lower Chitral District
- Lower Dir District
- Lower Kohistan District
- Lower South Waziristan District
- Malakand District
- Mansehra District
- Mardan District
- Mohmand District
- North Waziristan District
- Nowshera District
- Orakzai District
- Peshawar District
- Shangla District
- Swabi District
- Swat District
- Tank District
- Tor Ghar District
- Upper South Waziristan District
- Upper Chitral District
- Upper Dir District
- Upper Kohistan District

=== Major cities ===
Peshawar is the capital and largest city of Khyber Pakhtunkhwa. The city is the most populous and comprises more than one-eighth of the province's population.

== Economy ==
Khyber Pakhtunkhwa's dominance: forestry

Khyber Pakhtunkhwa has the third largest provincial economy in Pakistan. Khyber Pakhtunkhwa's share of Pakistan's GDP has historically comprised 10.5%, although the province accounts for 11.9% of Pakistan's total population. The part of the economy that Khyber Pakhtunkhwa dominates is forestry, where its share has historically ranged from a low of 34.9% to a high of 81%, giving an average of 61.56%. Currently, Khyber Pakhtunkhwa accounts for 10% of Pakistan's GDP, 20% of Pakistan's mining output and, since 1972, it has seen its economy grow in size by 3.6 times.

Agriculture remains important and the main cash crops include wheat, maize, tobacco (in Swabi), rice, sugar beets, as well as fruits are grown in the province.

Some manufacturing and high-tech investments in Peshawar have helped improve job prospects for many locals, while trade in the province involves nearly every product. The bazaars in the province are renowned throughout Pakistan. Unemployment has been reduced due to the establishment of industrial zones.

Workshops throughout the province support the manufacture of small arms and weapons. The province accounts for at least 78% of the marble production in Pakistan.

=== Infrastructure ===
The Sharmai Hydropower Project is a proposed power generation project located in the Upper Dir District of Khyber Pakhtunkhwa on the Panjkora River with an installed capacity of 150MW.

== Social issues ==
The Awami National Party sought to rename the province "Pakhtunkhwa", which translates to "Land of Pakhtuns" in the Pashto language. This was opposed by some non-Pashtuns in the province and political parties such as the Pakistan Muslim League-N (PML-N) and Muttahida Majlis-e-Amal (MMA), due to the PML-N deriving its support in the province from primarily non-Pashtun Hazara regions.

In 2010, the announcement that the province would have a new name led to a wave of protests in the Hazara region. On 15 April 2010, Pakistan's senate officially named the province "Khyber Pakhtunkhwa" with 80 senators in favour and 12 opposed. The MMA, who until the elections of 2008 had a majority in the Khyber Pakhtunkhwa government, had proposed "Afghania" as a compromise name.

After the 2008 general election, the Awami National Party formed a coalition provincial government with the Pakistan Peoples Party. The Awami National Party has its strongholds in the Pashtun areas of Pakistan, particularly in the Peshawar valley, while Karachi in Sindh has one of the largest Pashtun populations in the world—around 7 million by some estimates. In the 2008 election, the ANP won two Sindh assembly seats in Karachi. The Awami National Party has been instrumental in fighting the Taliban. In the 2013 general election Pakistan Tehreek-e-Insaf won a majority in the provincial assembly and has now formed their government in coalition with Jamaat-e-Islami Pakistan.

=== Non-government organisations ===
The following is a list of some of the major NGOs working in Khyber Pakhtunkhwa:

- Alkhidmat Foundation
- Aurat Foundation
- Shaukat Khanum Memorial Cancer Hospital & Research Centre
- Sarhad Rural Support Programme
- Human Rights Commission of Pakistan
- Frontier Education Foundation

== Folk music and culture ==
=== Music ===
Pashto folk music is popular in Khyber Pakhtunkhwa and has a rich tradition going back hundreds of years. The main instruments are the rubab, mangey and harmonium. Khowar folk music is popular in Chitral and northern Swat. The tunes of Khowar music are very different from those of Pashto, and the main instrument is the Chitrali sitar. A form of band music composed of clarinets (Surnai) and drums is popular in Chitral. It is played at polo matches and dances. The same form of band music is played in the neighbouring Northern Areas.

=== Literature ===
There is an important literature produced in the province, mainly in Pashto but also in Urdu and in Hindko, and in 2022 more than 25,000 books were published in these three languages.

== Education ==
University of Peshawar

Islamia College University

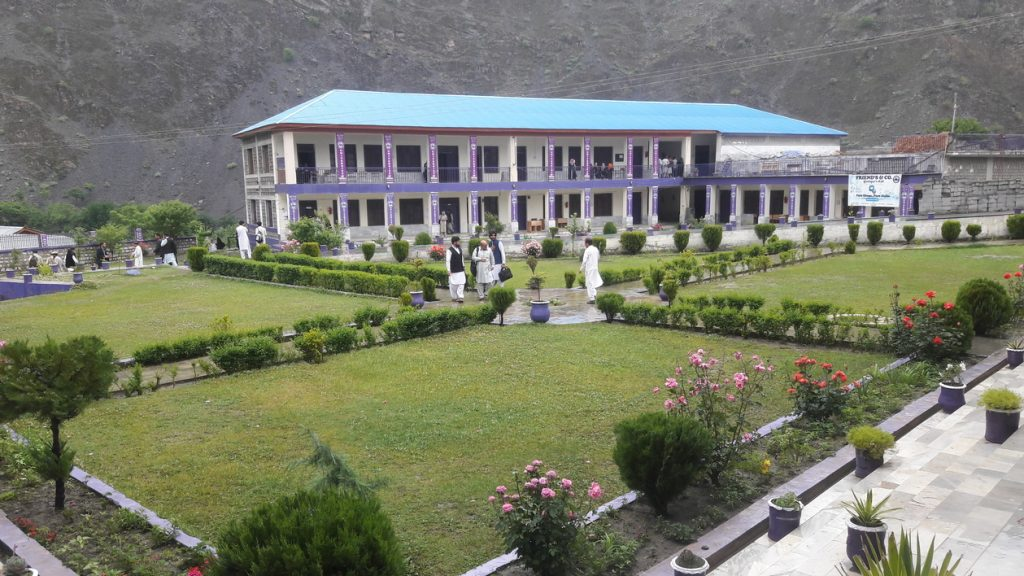
University of Chitral

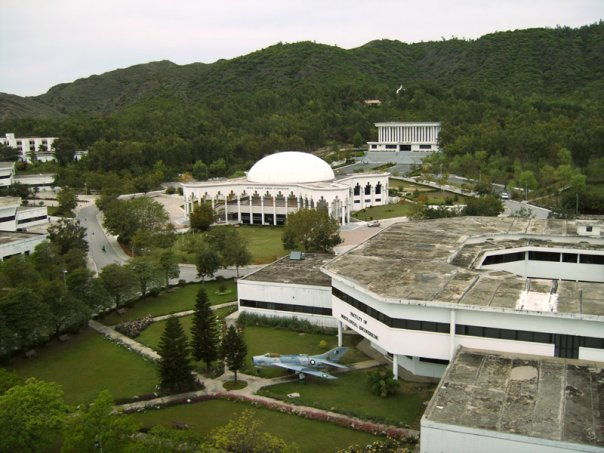
Ghulam Ishaq Khan Institute of Engineering Sciences and Technology

As FATA became part of KPK, all the literacy rates are recalculated by combining literacy rates of both regions.

Year	Total	Male	Female	Rural	Urban
1972	14.05%	...	...	...	...
1981	14.75%	23.39	5.54%	...	...
1998	32.63%	47.85%	16.38%	...	...
2017	49.51%	64.53%	34.34%	46.01%	66.63%
2023	51.09%	64.57%	37.15%	48.35%	65.55%

Khyber Pakhtunkhwa has traditionally had a very low literacy rate, although this is changing in recent times. As of the 2017 census, the literacy rate for Khyber Pakhtunkhwa (including FATA) is 51.66%. In rural areas, the literacy rate is 48.44% of the population while in urban areas it is 66.86%. Khyber Pakhtunkhwa has a huge gap in literacy rate between sexes – for men it is 66.67% while the female literacy rate is 34.58%, just over half the male literacy rate. This gap is particularly prominent in the overwhelmingly-Pashto rural areas, where traditional gender norms have generally limited education of women. As of 2021, Khyber Pakhtunkhwa (KP) has the highest literacy growth rate in the whole country (Pakistan).

=== Engineering universities ===
- CECOS University of Information Technology and Emerging Science, Peshawar
- National University of Sciences and Technology, Islamabad- College of Aeronautical Engineering, Risalpur Campus
- COMSATS Institute of Information Technology, Islamabad (Abbottabad Campus)
- City University of Science and Information Technology, Peshawar
- Gandhara Institute of Science & Technology, PGS Engineering College (University of Engineering & Technology, Peshawar)
- Ghulam Ishaq Khan Institute of Engineering Sciences and Technology, Topi-Swabi
- Iqra University Peshawar (Formerly Iqra University, Karachi (Peshawar Campus)
- National University of Sciences and Technology, Islamabad- Military College of Engineering, Risalpur Campus
- National University of Computer & Emerging Sciences, Islamabad (Peshawar Campus)
- University of Engineering & Technology, Peshawar (Main Campus)
- University of Engineering and Technology, Peshawar (Mardan Campus)
- University of Engineering & Technology, Peshawar (Bannu Campus)
- University of Engineering & Technology, Peshawar (Abbottabad Campus)
- University of Engineering & Technology, Peshawar (Kohat Campus)
- Sarhad University of Science and Information Technology, Peshawar
- Abasyn University, Peshawar
- University of Science and Technology, Bannu
- IMSciences, Peshawar
- Gomal University, Dera Ismail Khan

=== Major educational establishments ===
- Cadet College Razmak, North Waziristan District.
- Abbottabad Public School, Abbottabad
- Army Burn Hall College, Abbottabad
- University of Science and Technology Bannu, Bannu
- Cadet College Kohat, Kohat
- Edwardes College, Peshawar
- Abdul Wali Khan University Mardan, Mardan
- Gomal University, Dera Ismail Khan
- Islamia College University, Peshawar
- University of Agriculture, Peshawar
- University of Malakand, Chakdara
- University of Peshawar, Peshawar
- Khushal Khan Khattak University, Karak
- IMSciences, Peshawar
- Forward Degree College, Peshawar
- Khyber Medical University, Peshawar
- Khyber Girls Medical College, Peshawar
- Khyber Medical College, Peshawar

== Sports and tourism ==
=== Sports ===
Cricket is the main sport played in Khyber Pakhtunkhwa. It has produced world-class sportsmen like Shahid Afridi, Younis Khan, Khushdil Shah, Fakhar Zaman, Naseem Shah and Umar Gul. Besides producing cricket players, Khyber Pakhtunkhwa has the honour of being the birthplace of many world-class squash players, including greats like Hashim Khan, Qamar Zaman, Jahangir Khan and Jansher Khan.

== CNIC Codes ==
- Bannu Division (11XXX)
- Dera Ismail Khan Division (12XXX)
- Hazara Division (13XXX)
- Kohat Division (14XXX)
- Malakand Division (15XXX)
- Mardan Division (16XXX)
- Peshawar Division (17XXX)

== See also ==
- Northern Pakistan
- List of cultural heritage sites in Khyber Pakhtunkhwa
- List of hospitals in Khyber Pakhtunkhwa
