= University of Science & Technology Bannu =

Public University in Bannu, Pakistan

- د بنو د ساينس او ټکنالوژۍ پوهنتون
- Type: Public
- Established: 2005
- Chancellor: Governor of Khyber Pakhtunkhwa
- Vice-Chancellor: Prof. Dr Safdar Rehman Ghazi
- Registrar: Dr. Khairullah khan
- Location: Bannu, Khyber-Pakhtunkhwa, Pakistan
- Campus: Rural
- Colours: Gold, Green, Blue
- Nickname: USTB
- Website: www.ustb.edu.pk

The University of Science & Technology Bannu (USTB) (Pashto: د بنو د ساينس او ټکنالوژۍ پوهنتون) is a public university located in the rural area of Bannu District, Khyber-Pakhtunkhwa, Pakistan.

Established in 2005, the university offers undergraduate, post-graduate, and doctoral programmes in engineering, social and natural sciences, arts, and humanities.

== Faculties and degrees ==
UST Bannu's first academic year was September 2005, with 200 students in various disciplines of IIT (Institute of Information Technology) and IMS (Institute of Management Sciences). Presently, Bachelor and Master level degrees are offered while the university has the intention to offer PhD level degrees. Department of Physics, Chemistry, Botany and Biotechnology also in place. Department of Education and Maths also established. All the departments offer postgrad and undergrad admissions. Soon Lakki Marwat campus will be established. The UST Bannu intends to offer degrees in Life Sciences, Engineering & Technology, Social Sciences, Physical Sciences, Business Studies and Humanities.

== Governance ==
The University of Science and Technology Bannu is a newly established Pakistan Public Sector University created under Provincial Assembly Act No. XIII in 2005. (Notification No: PA/NWFP/Legis:1/2005/28/16.)

It is an autonomous body governed by the Chancellor's Committee. This committee is headed by the Governor of the Khyber-Pakhtunkhwa wide Ordinance of 2005, comprises seven members and is the major policy maker and controlling body of the university. The committee is a think tank of leading experts in education, religious scholars, leaders in the business community and senior officials of the government. The committee acts as a bridge between the university and the community.
