= Shina people =

Ethnolinguistic group in South Asia

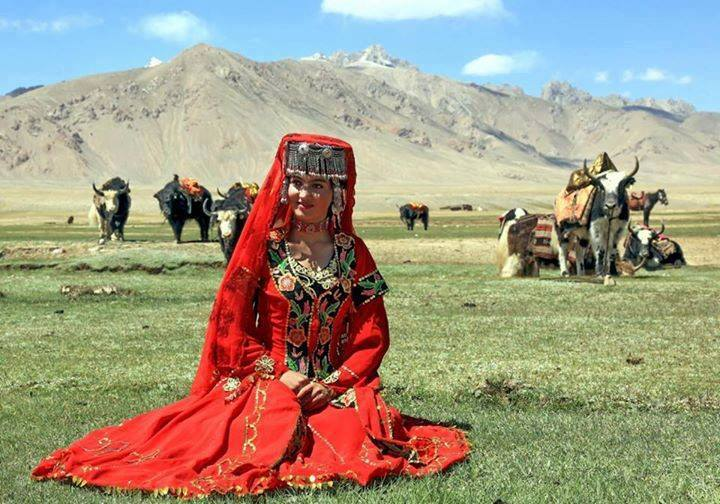
- Shina woman in bridal attire

Total population
- c. 1,178,400 including Kohistani, Shina

Regions with significant populations
- Pakistan: 1,146,000 (2018)
- India: Ladakh 32000, Gurez 37000

Languages
- L1: Shina (native language); L2: Urdu (national language of Pakistan)

Religion
- Predominantly: Islam

Related ethnic groups
- Other Indo-Aryan peoples

The Shina (Shina: ݜݨیاٗ, Ṣiṇyaá) or Gilgitis are an Indo-Aryan ethnolinguistic group primarily residing in Gilgit-Baltistan and Indus Kohistan in Pakistan, as well as in the Gurez and Dras regions of Jammu and Kashmir and Ladakh in India. They speak an Indo-Aryan language, called Shina and their geographic area of predominance is referred to as Shinaki.

== Geography ==
In Pakistan, the Shina, also known as Gilgitis after their largest city, Gilgit, are the major ethnic group of Gilgit-Baltistan, and the Shina language is spoken by an estimated 600,000 people living mainly in Gilgit-Baltistan and Kohistan. People belonging to the Shina community people are also settled in the upper Neelum Valley in Pakistan, as well as in Dras, in the far northwest of the Kargil district of Ladakh and in the Kishenganga Valley (Gurez) of northern Jammu and Kashmir in India. Outliers of Shina such as Brokskat speakers are found in Ladakh, Palula and Sawi speakers in Chitral, Ushojo speakers in the Swat Valley, and Kalkoti speakers in Panjkora Valley. Many Shina people have also migrated to Karachi and Islamabad for employment, carrying out business, and education purposes, and many of them have permanently settled in these cities.

== History ==
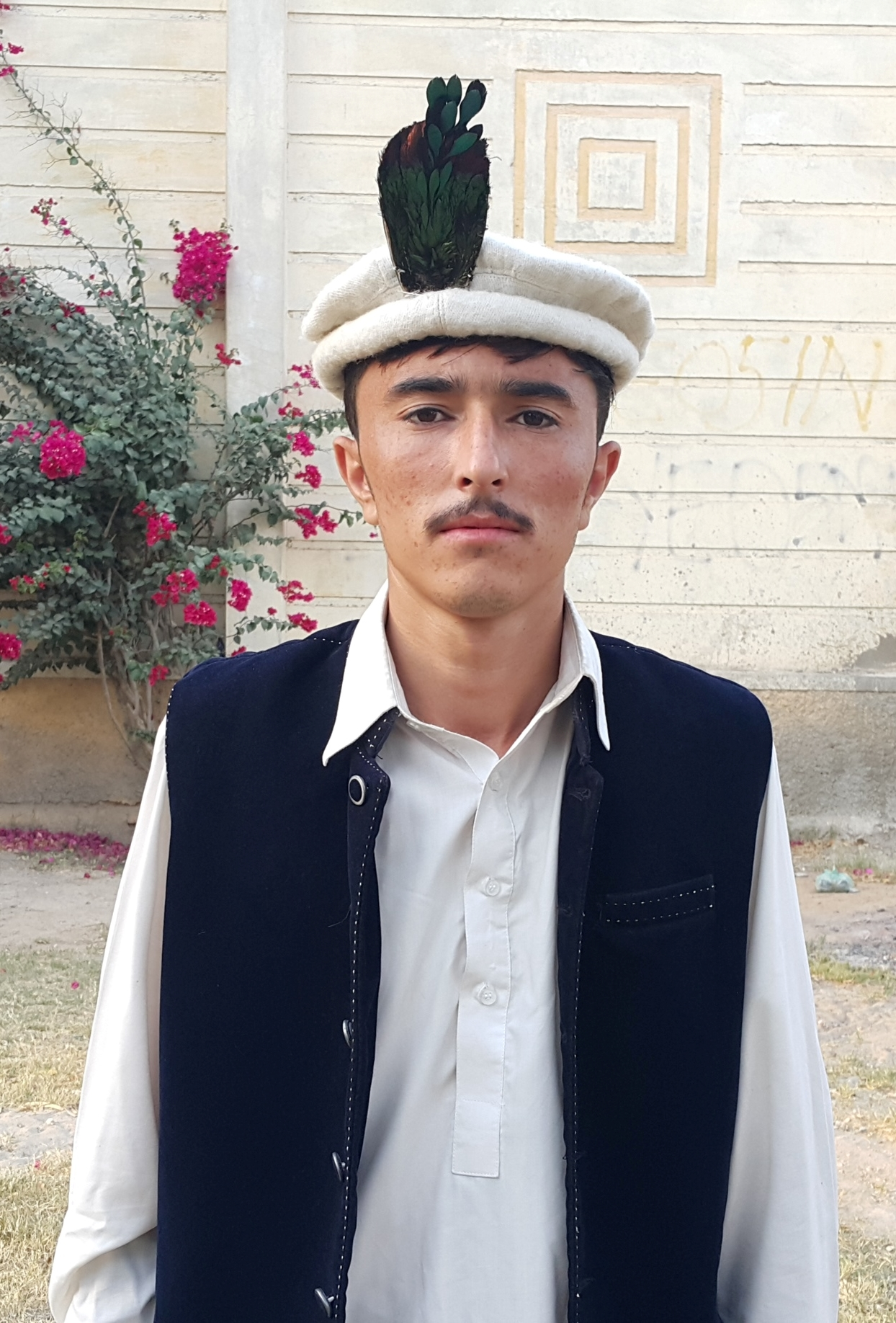
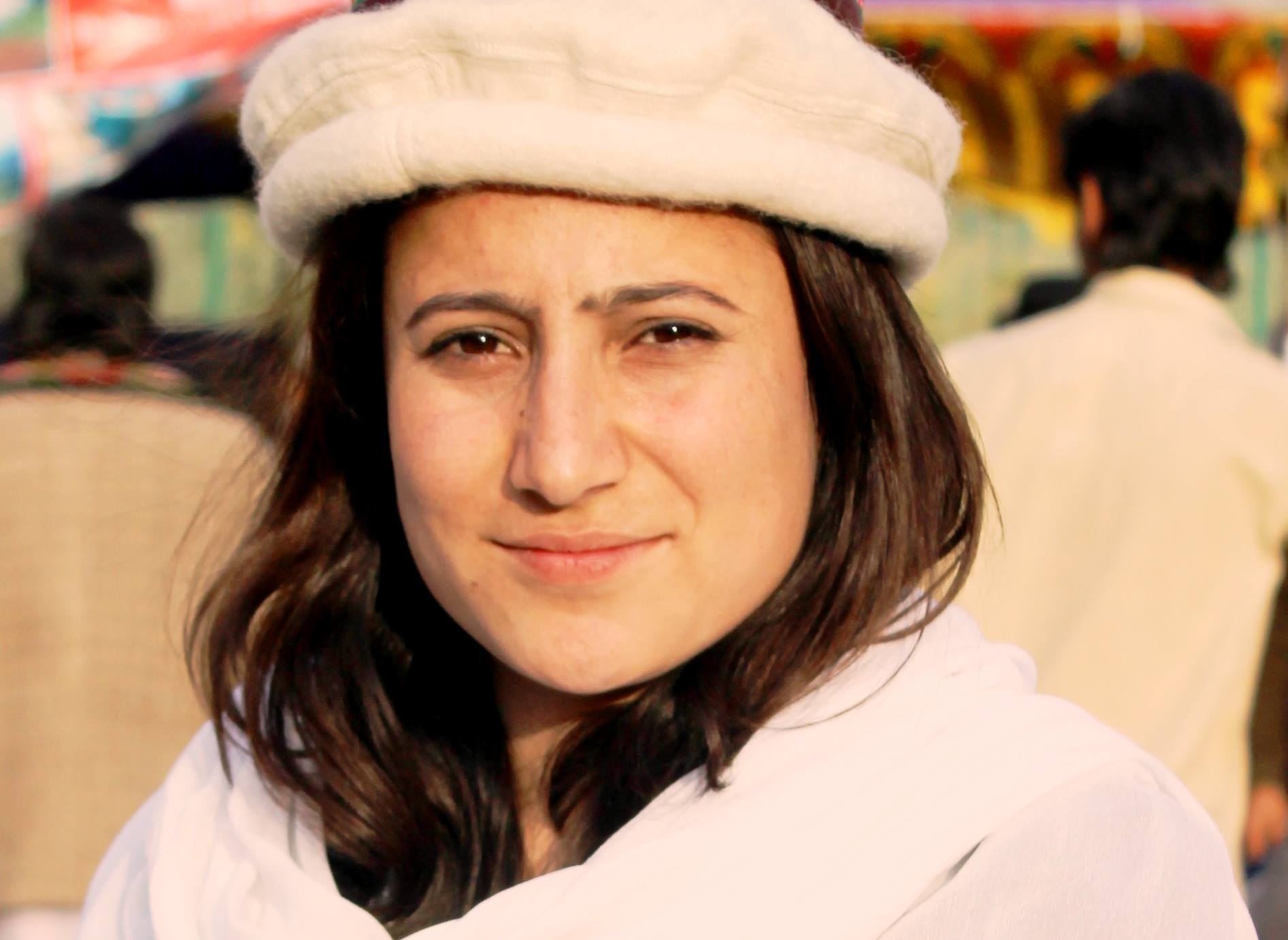
Shina man and woman in traditional attire, including the traditional cap featuring a shati (feather)

The Shina people are believed to have expanded into the Gilgit region from their original homeland in Shinkari, located in the Kohistan region along the Indus River, around the 6th century or 7th century CE. Following their migration to Gilgit, Shina-speaking communities gradually settled in parts of Chitral, the Nagar Valley, Baltistan, and areas of Ladakh, including Kargil. Some accounts suggest that the Shina were among the early settlers of Ladakh and ruled parts of the region prior to the Tibetan invasions. The last king of Shina ethnicity in Ladakh is said to have been Tatah Khan (also known as Tratryi). A number of place names in the Kargil region are believed to have Shina linguistic origins, and some historians propose that the name "Kargil" itself may be derived from a Shina personal name, "Kargi". Today, Shina-speaking communities in Ladakh are primarily found in the Drass region, Kargil town, and the Batalik sector.

The Shina people historically practised Hinduism, as well as Buddhism. However, both Hinduism and Buddhism were relegated to being the religion of the ruling and upper class although Hinduism had more success among the masses. Their chief peculiarity was their feeling towards the cow, which they held in abhorrence and was considered by them as unclean. Even after the majority of the ethnic group's conversion to Islam, orthodox Shins would continue to neither eat beef, drink cow's milk nor touch any vessel containing it, because a dead cow or a suckling calf is considered especially unclean, so that purification was necessary even if the garments touched it. In Gilgit, Hunza and Nagar, the Hindu Shins formerly practised sati, which ceased before A.D. 1740. 1877, in that region, marked the last year that Shina men underwent Hindu cremation rites.

The Shina were exposed to Islam around the 12th century. Waves of conversions occurred during the 14th, 16th and 17th centuries. By the late 19th century, most Shina were adherents of Islam. Many castes of the Shina people in Kohistan, such as the Açar'îta caste, converted to Islam in the 19th century coinciding with Pashtunization and this faith is now observed by the majority of the ethnic group. A small minority of related ethnic groups, chiefly the Brokpa community, continue to practice Buddhism, though the majority of them are adherents to Islam.

== Genetics ==
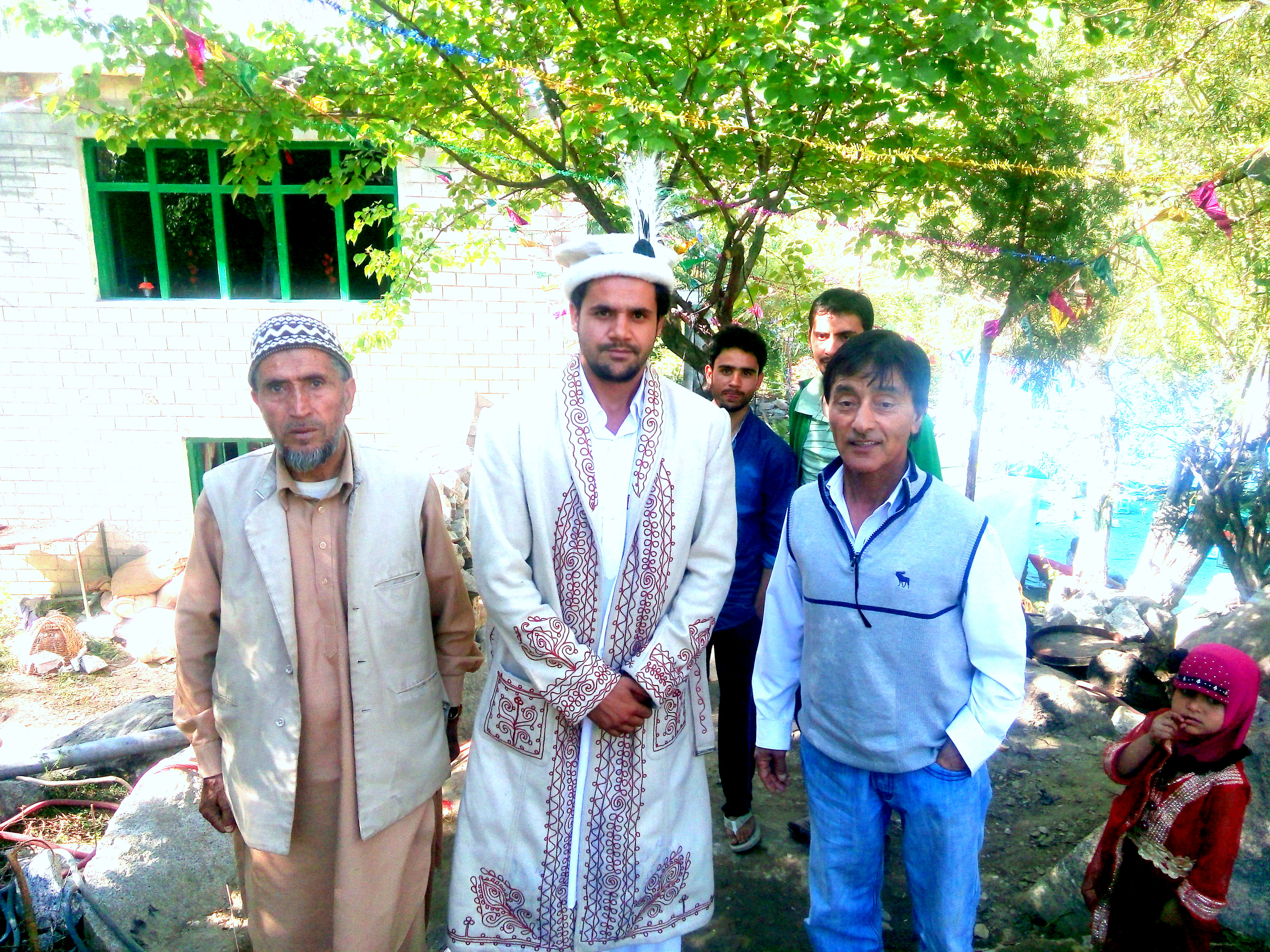
Shina in Kargil, Ladakh

Mah Noor et al. (2019) found West Eurasian mtDNA in 89% (eight out of nine) of Shina samples. These included one sample each from the following haplogroups: H14a, T1a, H2a, T2, U7, U5b and HV2. Additionally, 11.1% (one sample) of the samples belonged to haplogroup M54, which is of South Asian origin. The mtDNA sequences obtained from the Shina population were then compared with those from surrounding north-western Pakistani population groups. Haplogroup frequency, phylogenetic tree and network analyses identified the West Eurasian ancestral origin of the Shina group, showing nearby maternal ancestral relationships with the Kashmiri population. However, no close genetic relationship was depicted between the Shina and the nearby Kho population group.

== Festivals ==
The Shina festival of Chili marks the commencement of wheat sowing, as with other celebrations in the Indian subcontinent, including Lohri and Makar Sankranti. Chilli also formerly had a connection with the worship of the cedar. Cedar worship is prevalent among historic the Hindu communities of Himalayas, from the Hindu Kush region to Himachal and Uttarakhand. It is known as Deodar, which is derived from the Sanskrit word Devadaru, which means "wood of the gods" and is a compound of the words deva (god) and dāru (wood, etym. tree). The Cedar is also sacred in Kafiristan.

== Notable people ==
- Hasan Raheem, singer-songwriter
- Ali Sadpara, mountaineer

== See also ==
- Shina language
- Gilgit Scouts
