= Languages of Pakistan =

- Dominant mother tongue in the districts of Pakistan as of the 2017 Pakistani census
- Official: Urdu (nationwide) (Note: Urdu and English have official status all around the country under the provisions of the Pakistani constitution); English (nationwide); Sindhi (in Sindh) (Note: Sindh's official language is Sindhi. It is the only province in the country that has its own official language, alongside the nationally official languages Urdu and English)
- National: Urdu (Note: Under the provisions of the Pakistani constitution, Urdu has status as the 'national language')
- Regional: Over 70 regional languages
- Signed: Pakistani Sign Language
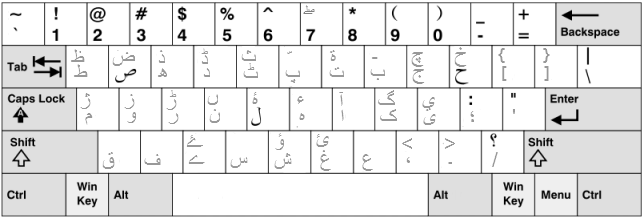
- Keyboard layout: QWERTY and Urdu keyboard

Pakistan is a multilingual country with over 70 languages spoken as first languages. The majority of Pakistan's languages belong to the Indo-Iranian group of the Indo-European language family.

Urdu is the national language and the lingua franca of Pakistan, and while sharing official status with English, it is the preferred and dominant language used for inter-communication between different ethnic groups. Numerous regional languages are spoken as first languages by Pakistan's various ethnolinguistic groups.

According to the 2023 census, languages with more than a million speakers each include Punjabi, Pashto, Sindhi, Saraiki, Urdu, Balochi, Hindko, Brahui and the Kohistani languages. The census excludes data from Gilgit-Baltistan and Azad Kashmir, therefore Shina and Balti population might not be exact. There are approximately 60 local languages with fewer than a million speakers.

== List of languages ==
The 2022 edition of Ethnologue lists 80 established languages in Pakistan. Of these, 68 are indigenous and 12 are non-indigenous. In terms of their vitality, 4 are classified as 'institutional', 24 are 'developing', 30 are 'vigorous', 15 are 'in trouble', and 4 are 'dying'.

Established languages
Language	Province (Note: Excluding large urban centres)	Language group
Aer	Sindh	Indo-Aryan
Badeshi	Khyber Pakhtunkwa	Iranian
Bagri	Punjab, Sindh	Indo-Aryan
Balochi, Makrani	Balochistan	Iranian
Balochi, Rakhshani	Balochistan	Iranian
Balochi, Sulaimani	Balochistan, Punjab, Sindh	Iranian
Balti	Gilgit-Baltistan	Sino-Tibetan
Bateri	Khyber Pakhtunkwa	Indo-Aryan
Bhaya	Sindh	Indo-Aryan
Brahui	Balochistan, Sindh	Dravidian
Burushaski	Gilgit-Baltistan	Isolate
Chilisso	Khyber Pakhtunkwa	Indo-Aryan
Dameli	Khyber Pakhtunkwa	Indo-Aryan
Dari	Khyber Pakhtunkwa, Balochistan	Iranian
Dehwari	Balochistan	Iranian
Dhatki	Sindh	Indo-Aryan
Domaaki	Gilgit-Baltistan	Indo-Aryan
English	Federal co-official	Germanic
Gawar-Bati	Khyber Pakhtunkwa	Indo-Aryan
Gawri	Khyber Pakhtunkwa	Indo-Aryan
Ghera	Sindh	Indo-Aryan
Goaria	Sindh	Indo-Aryan
Gowro	Khyber Pakhtunkwa	Indo-Aryan
Gujari	Azad Kashmir, Gilgit-Baltistan, Khyber Pakhtunkwa, Punjab	Indo-Aryan
Gurgula	Sindh	Indo-Aryan
Haryanvi aka Rangri	Sindh, Punjab	Indo-Aryan
Hazaragi	Balochistan	Iranian
Hindko, Northern	Azad Kashmir, Khyber Pakhtunkwa	Indo-Aryan
Hindko, Southern	Khyber Pakhtunkwa, Punjab	Indo-Aryan
Jadgali	Balochistan, Sindh	Indo-Aryan
Jandavra	Sindh	Indo-Aryan
Jogi	Sindh	Indo-Aryan
Kabutra	Sindh	Indo-Aryan
Kacchi	Sindh	Indo-Aryan
Kalasha	Khyber Pakhtunkwa	Indo-Aryan
Kalkoti	Khyber Pakhtunkwa	Indo-Aryan
Kamviri	Khyber Pakhtunkwa	Nuristani
Kashmiri	Azad Kashmir	Indo-Aryan
Kati	Khyber Pakhtunkwa	Nuristani
Khetrani	Balochistan	Indo-Aryan
Khowar	Gilgit-Baltistan, Khyber Pakhtunkwa	Indo-Aryan
Kyrgyz	Chitral, Hunza	Turkic
Kohistani, Indus	Khyber Pakhtunkwa	Indo-Aryan
Koli, Kachi	Sindh	Indo-Aryan
Koli, Parkari	Sindh	Indo-Aryan
Koli, Wadiyari	Sindh	Indo-Aryan
Kutchi	Sindh	Indo-Aryan
Kundal Shahi	Azad Kashmir	Indo-Aryan
Lasi	Balochistan	Indo-Aryan
Loarki	Sindh	Indo-Aryan
Mankiyali	Khyber Pakhtunkwa	Indo-Aryan
Marwari	Punjab, Sindh	Indo-Aryan
Mewati	Punjab, Sindh	Indo-Aryan
Memoni	Sindh	Indo-Aryan
Oadki	Punjab, Sindh	Indo-Aryan
Ormuri	Khyber Pakhtunkwa	Iranian
Pahari-Pothwari	Azad Kashmir, Punjab,Islamabad	Indo-Aryan
Pakistan Sign Language	Throughout	Indo-Pakistani Sign Language
Palula	Khyber Pakhtunkwa	Indo-Aryan
Pashto, Central	Balochistan, Khyber Pakhtunkwa, Punjab	Iranian
Pashto, Northern	Khyber Pakhtunkwa, Punjab, Islamabad	Iranian
Pashto, Southern	Balochistan, Khyber Pakhtunkwa, Punjab	Iranian
Punjabi	Punjab, Sindh, Islamabad	Indo-Aryan
Saraiki	Balochistan, Khyber Pakhtunkwa, Punjab, Sindh	Indo-Aryan
Sarikoli	Khyber Pakhtunkwa, Gilgit-Baltistan	Iranian
Savi	Khyber Pakhtunkwa	Indo-Aryan
Shina	Azad Kashmir, Gilgit-Baltistan, Khyber Pakhtunkwa	Indo-Aryan
Shina, Kohistani	Khyber Pakhtunkwa	Indo-Aryan
Sindhi	Sindh, Balochistan	Indo-Aryan
Sindhi Bhil	Sindh	Indo-Aryan
Torwali	Khyber Pakhtunkwa	Indo-Aryan
Urdu	Sindh, Punjab, Azad Kashmir, Islamabad	Indo-Aryan
Ushojo	Khyber Pakhtunkwa	Indo-Aryan
Vaghri	Sindh	Indo-Aryan
Wakhi	Gilgit-Baltistan, Khyber Pakhtunkwa	Iranian
Waneci	Balochistan	Iranian
Waziri	Khyber Pakhtunkwa	Iranian
Yadgha	Khyber Pakhtunkwa	Iranian

== Statistics ==
Most spoken language in each Pakistani subdivision (tehsil) (Note: The linguistic breakdown in the four provinces and ICT is as per 2023 census. For Azad Jammu and Kashmir, see the 2020 official survey. For Gilgit Baltistan see Backstrom & Radloff 1992. For Gilgit Baltistan specifically, see also the languages of Gilgit Baltistan.)

Languages of Pakistan (2023 census)
1. Punjabi (37.0%)
2. Pashto (18.1%)
3. Sindhi (14.3%)
4. Saraiki (12.0%)
5. Urdu (9.25%)
6. Balochi (3.38%)
7. Hindko (2.32%)
8. Brahui (1.16%)
9. Mewati (0.46%)
10. Kohistani (0.43%)
11. Kashmiri (0.11%)
12. Shina (0.05%)
13. Balti (0.02%)
14. Kalasha (0.00%)
15. Others (1.38%)

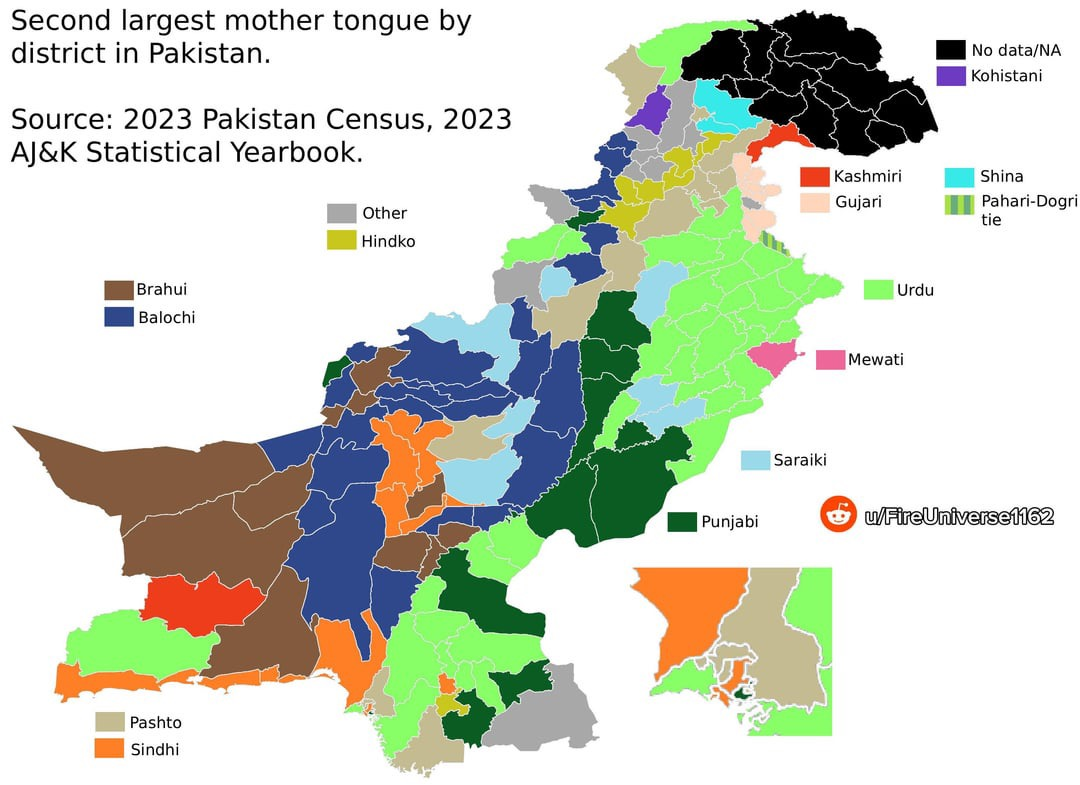
Second Largest mother tongue in Pakistan by district

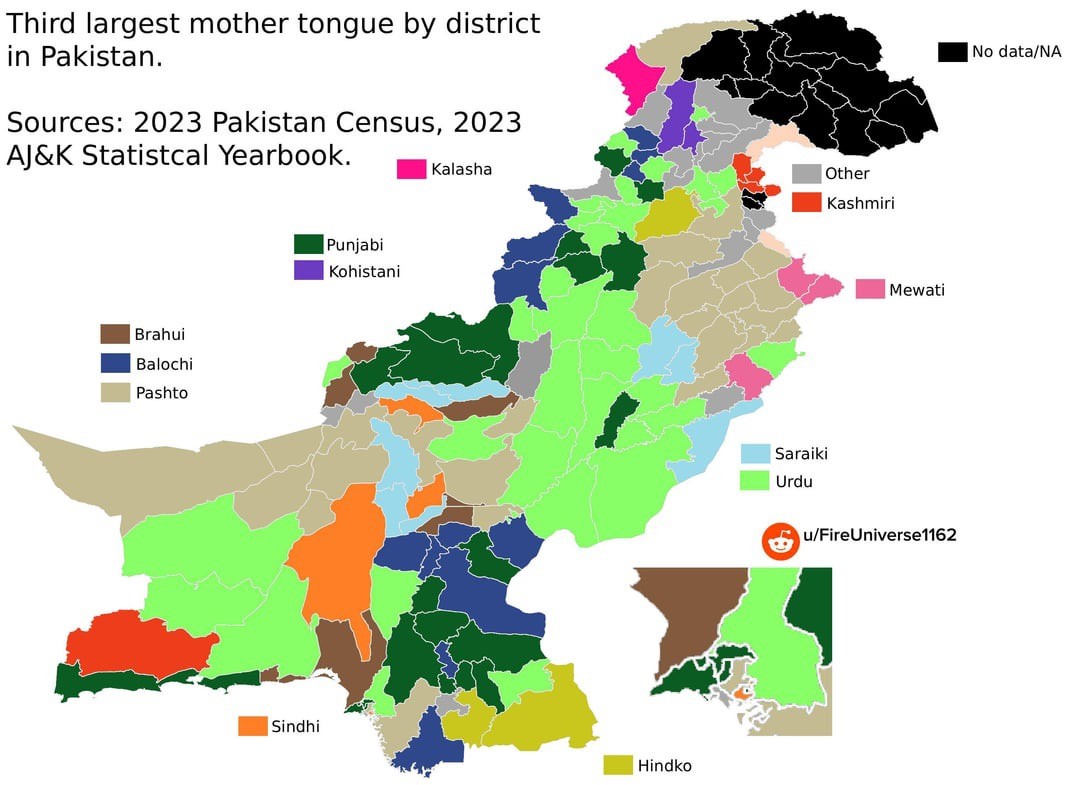
Third Largest mother tongue in Pakistan by district

Census history of major languages
Rank	Language	1951 census (Note: Only include statistics for West Pakistan)	1961 census	1972 census	1981 census	1998 census	2017 census	2023 census
1	Punjabi	67.08%	66.39%	...	48.17%	44.15%	38.78%	36.98%
2	Pashto	8.16%	8.47%	...	13.15%	15.42%	18.24%	18.15%
3	Sindhi	12.85%	12.59%	...	11.77%	14.1%	14.57%	14.31%
4	Saraiki	...	...	...	9.84%	10.53%	12.19%	12.00%
5	Urdu	7.05%	7.57%	...	7.60%	7.57%	7.08%	9.25%
6	Balochi	3.04%	2.49%	...	3.02%	3.57%	3.02%	3.38%
7	Hindko	...	...	...	2.43%	...	2.44%	2.32%
8	Brahui	0.70%	0.93%	...	1.21%	...	1.24%	1.16%
9	Mewati	...	...	...	...	...	...	0.46%
10	Kohistani	...	...	...	...	...	...	0.43%
11	Kashmiri	...	...	...	...	...	0.17%	0.11%
12	Shina	...	...	...	...	...	...	0.05%
13	Balti	...	...	...	...	...	...	0.02%
14	Kalasha	...	...	...	...	...	...	0.003%
15	Others	1.12%	1.56%	...	2.81%	4.66%	2.27%	1.38%

* Saraiki and Hindko were included with Punjabi until the 1981 census.

*Census data for the Pakistani administered territories of Gilgit-Baltistan and Azad Kashmir not available as of 2024.

== Official languages ==
=== Urdu (official language) ===
The proportion of people with Urdu as their mother tongue in each Pakistani District as of the 2023 Pakistani Census

Urdu (اردو) is the national language (قومی زبان) and lingua franca of Pakistan. According to the 2023 census, only about 9.25% of Pakistanis reported it as their first language. However, it is widely spoken and understood as a second language across the country and serves as a symbol of national identity for all the Pakistanis.

Urdu was chosen as a symbol of unity for the new state of Pakistan in 1947, because the linguistic patriotism of South Asian Muslims over Urdu played a significant role in the formation of Pakistan, and it also had already served as a lingua franca among Muslims in north and northwest British India. It is written, spoken and used in all provinces/territories of Pakistan, and together with English as the main languages of instruction, although the people from differing provinces may have different native languages.

Urdu is taught as a compulsory subject up to higher secondary school in both English and Urdu medium school systems, which has produced millions of second-language Urdu speakers among people whose native language is one of the other languages of Pakistan – which in turn has led to the absorption of vocabulary from various regional Pakistani languages, while some Urdu vocabulary has also been assimilated by Pakistan's regional languages.

=== English (co-official language) ===
English is a co-official language of Pakistan and is widely used in the executive, legislative and judicial branches as well as to some extent in the officer ranks of Pakistan's armed forces. Pakistan's Constitution and laws were written in English and are now being re-written in the local languages. It is also widely used in schools, colleges and universities as a medium of instruction. English is seen as the language of upward mobility, and its use is becoming more prevalent in upper social circles, where it is often spoken alongside native Pakistani languages. In 2015, it was announced that there were plans to promote Urdu in official business, but Pakistan's Minister of Planning Ahsan Iqbal stated, "Urdu will be a second medium of language and all official business will be bilingual." He also went on to say that English would be taught alongside Urdu in schools.

== Major regional languages ==
=== Punjabi ===
The proportion of people with Punjabi as their mother tongue in each Pakistani District as of the 2023 Pakistani Census

Punjabi (پنجابی) is an Indo-Aryan language primarily spoken in the Punjab province of Pakistan, with the prominent dialect being the Majhi dialect, written in the Shahmukhi script. Punjabi is the most widely spoken language in Pakistan. It is spoken as a first language by 36.98% of Pakistanis. The language is spoken among a significant overseas diaspora, particularly in Canada, the United Kingdom, and the United States. Punjabi is unusual among the Indo-Aryan languages and the broader Indo-European language family in its usage of lexical tone. It is also spoken in Indian Punjab but it is official there, unlike in Pakistani Punjab.

=== Pashto ===
The proportion of people with Pashto as their mother tongue in each Pakistani District as of the 2023 Pakistani Census

Pashto (پښتو) is an Iranian language spoken as a first language by more than 18.15% of Pakistanis, mainly in Khyber Pakhtunkhwa, as well as in ethnic Pashtun communities in northern Balochistan and the cities of Islamabad, Rawalpindi and most notably Karachi, which may have the largest Pashtun population of any city in the world. There are three major dialect patterns within which the various individual dialects may be classified; these are the Pakhto variety of Northern (Peshawar) variety, the southern Pashto spoken in the vicinity of Quetta.

=== Sindhi ===
The proportion of people with Sindhi as their mother tongue in each Pakistani District as of the 2023 Pakistani Census

Sindhi (سنڌي) is an Indo-Aryan language spoken as a first language by almost 14.31% of Pakistanis, mostly in the Sindh province of Pakistan. The name "Sindhi" is derived from Sindhu, the original name of the Indus River.

Like other languages of this family, Sindhi has passed through Old Indo-Aryan (Sanskrit) and Middle Indo-Aryan (Pali, secondary Prakrits, and Apabhramsha) stages of growth. 20th century Western scholars such as George Abraham Grierson believed that Sindhi descended specifically from the Vrācaḍa dialect of Apabhramsha (described by Markandeya as being spoken in Sindhu-deśa) but later work has shown this to be unlikely. It entered the New Indo-Aryan stage around the 10th century CE.

The six major known dialects of the Sindhi language are Siroli, Vicholi, Lari, Thari, Lasi and Kutchi.

=== Saraiki ===
The proportion of people with Saraiki as their mother tongue in each Pakistani District as of the 2023 Pakistani Census

Saraiki (سرائیکی) is an Indo Aryan language of the Lahnda group spoken in central and southeastern Pakistan, primarily in the southern part of the province of Punjab. Saraiki is to a high degree mutually intelligible with Standard Punjabi and coshares with it a large portion of its vocabulary and morphology. At the same time in its phonology it is radically different, though still akin to surrounding Punjabi dialects.

Saraiki is spoken by approximately 26 million people in Pakistan, ranging across southern Punjab, southern Khyber Pakhtunkhwa, and border regions of northern Sindh and eastern Balochistan.

=== Balochi ===
The proportion of people with Balochi as their mother tongue in each Pakistani District as of the 2023 Pakistani Census

Balochi (بلۏچی) is an Iranian language spoken as a first language by about 3% of Pakistanis, mostly in the Balochistan province of Pakistan.

=== Hindko ===
The proportion of people with Hindko as their mother tongue in each Pakistani District as of the 2023 Pakistani Census

Hindko (ہندکو) is an Indo-Aryan language group of Lahnda spoken in several discontinuous areas in northwestern Pakistan, primarily in the provinces of Khyber Pakhtunkhwa and Punjab. It is mutually intelligible with Standard Punjabi and Saraiki,The word Hindko, commonly used to refer to a number of Indo-Aryan languages spoken in the neighbourhood of Pashto, likely originally meant "the Indian language" (in contrast to Pashto). An alternative local name for this language group is Hindki. (Note: The term Hindki normally refers to a Hindko speaker and Shackle (1980, p. 482) reports that in Pashto the term has slightly pejorative connotations, which are avoided with the recently introduced term Hindkūn.)

=== Brahui ===
The proportion of people with Brahui as their mother tongue in each Pakistani District as of the 2023 Pakistani Census

Brahui (براہوئی) is a Dravidian language spoken in the central part of Balochistan province of Pakistan. Brahui is spoken mainly in Kalat, Khuzdar, Mastung, Nushki and Surab districts, but also in smaller numbers in neighboring districts, as well as in Afghanistan which borders Balochistan province of Pakistan; however, many members of the ethnic group no longer speak Brahui.

== Endangered languages ==
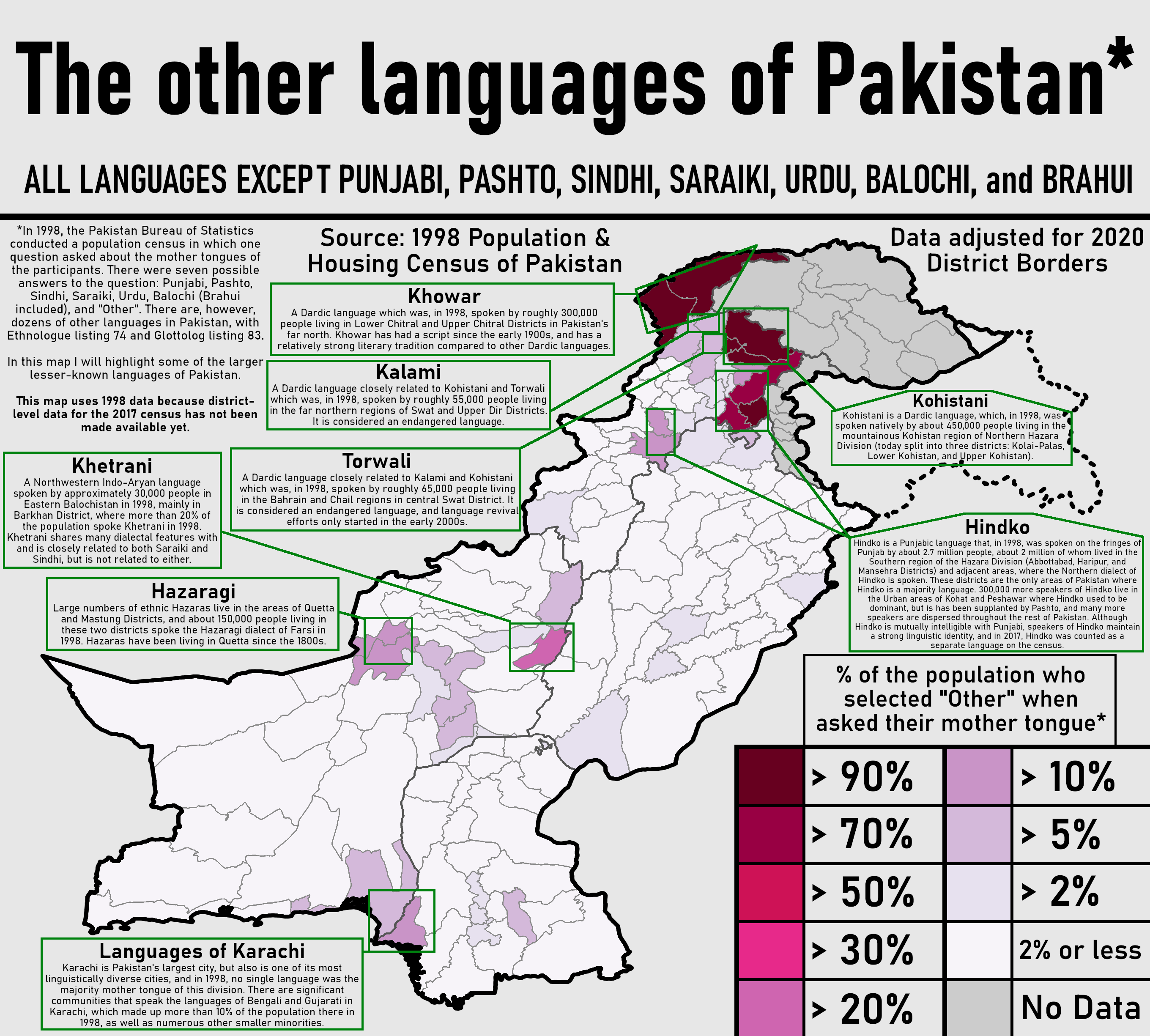
Map showing some of the minor languages in Pakistan as of 1998.

Other languages spoken by linguistic minorities include the languages listed below, with speakers ranging from a few dozen to tens of thousands. A few are highly endangered languages that may soon have no speakers at all. The United Nations Educational, Scientific and Cultural Organization defines five levels of language endangerment between "safe" (not endangered) and "extinct":

- Vulnerable – "most children speak the language, but it may be restricted to certain domains (e.g., home)"
- Definitely endangered – "children no longer learn the language as mother tongue in the home"
- Severely endangered – "language is spoken by grandparents and older generations; while the parent generation may understand it, they do not speak it to children or among themselves"
- Critically endangered – "the youngest speakers are grandparents and older, and they speak the language partially and infrequently"
- Extinct – "there are no speakers left; included in the Atlas if presumably extinct since the 1950s"

The list below includes the findings from the third edition of Atlas of the World's Languages in Danger (2010; formerly the Red Book of Endangered Languages), as well as the online edition of the aforementioned publication, both published by UNESCO.

Language	Status	Comments	ISO 639-3
Balti	Vulnerable	Also spoken in: India	bft
Bashkarik	Definitely endangered		gwc, xka
Badeshi	Critically endangered	Only three speakers remaining as of 2018.	bdz
Bateri	Definitely endangered		btv
Bhadravahi	Definitely endangered	Also spoken in: India	bhd
Brahui	Vulnerable	Also spoken in: Afghanistan	brh
Burushaski	Vulnerable		bsk
Chilisso	Severely endangered		clh
Dameli	Severely endangered		dml
Domaaki	Severely endangered		dmk
Gawar-Bati	Definitely endangered	Also spoken in: Afghanistan	gwt
Gowro	Severely endangered		gwf
Jadgali			jdg
Kalasha language	Severely endangered	Not to be confused with Kalasha-ala	kls
Kalkoti	Severely endangered		
Kati (Kamkata-viri, Kata-vari, Kamviri)	Definitely endangered	Also spoken in: Afghanistan	bsh, xvi
Khowar	Vulnerable		khw
Kundal Shahi	Definitely endangered	Also spoken in: India	
Kutchi	Vulnerable	Also spoken in: India	kfr
Maiya	Vulnerable		mvy
Ormuri	Definitely endangered	Also spoken in: Afghanistan	oru
Phalura	Definitely endangered		phl
Purik	Vulnerable	Also spoken in: India	prx
Savi	Definitely endangered	Also spoken in: Afghanistan	sdg
Spiti	Vulnerable	Also spoken in: India	spt
Torwali	Definitely endangered		trw
Ushojo	Definitely endangered		ush
Wakhi	Definitely endangered	Also spoken in: China, Tajikistan, Afghanistan	wbl
Yidgha	Definitely endangered		ydg
Zangskari	Definitely endangered	Also spoken in: India	zau

== Other languages ==
=== Arabic ===
Arabic is used as a religious language by Muslims. The Quran, Sunnah, Hadith and Muslim theology is taught in Arabic with Urdu translation. Arabic is taught as a religious language in mosques, schools, colleges, universities and madrassahs. A majority of Pakistan's Muslim population has had some form of formal or informal education in the reading, writing and pronunciation of Arabic as part of their religious education. However, Pakistanis do not speak Arabic.

Arabic is mentioned in the constitution of Pakistan. It declares in article 31 No. 2 that "The State shall endeavour, as respects the Muslims of Pakistan (a) to make the teaching of the Holy Quran and Islamiat compulsory, to encourage and facilitate the learning of Arabic language ..."

The National Education Policy 2017 declares in article 3.7.4 that: "Arabic as compulsory part will be integrated in Islamiyat from Middle to Higher Secondary level to enable the students to understand the Holy Quran." Furthermore, it specifies in article 3.7.6: "Arabic as elective subject shall be offered properly at Secondary and Higher Secondary level with Arabic literature and grammar in its course to enable the learners to have command in the language." This law is also valid for private schools as it defines in article 3.7.12: "The curriculum in Islamiyat, Arabic and Moral Education of public sector will be adopted by the private institutions to make uniformity in the society."

=== Persian ===
Persian was the official language of the region up until the late 19th century when the English passed several laws to replace it with local languages. Persian had a long history in the lands of Pakistan and was the cultural language of the erstwhile Mughal Empire, a continuation since the introduction of the language by Central Asian Turkic invaders who migrated into the Indian Subcontinent, and the patronisation of it by the earlier Turko-Persian Delhi Sultanate. Persian was officially abolished as a language of administration with the arrival of the British: in Sindh in 1843 and in Punjab in 1849.

Today, the eastern Dari dialect of Persian is spoken by some Afghans in Pakistan and a small number of local Balochistani Hazara community. A larger number of Pakistani Hazaras speak Hazaragi dialect. In the Madaklasht valley of Chitral, the Madaklashti dialect of Tajik Persian is spoken by the descendants of ironmongers from Badakhshan who settled there in the eighteenth century.

=== Foreign languages ===
As of 2017 some Pakistanis are learning Mandarin to do business with companies from the People's Republic of China.

== Classification ==
=== Indo-Iranian ===
Most of the languages of Pakistan belong to the Indo-Iranian branch of the Indo-European language family. The common ancestor of all of the languages in this family is called Proto-Indo-Iranian—also known as Common Aryan—which was spoken in approximately the late 3rd millennium BC. The three branches of the modern Indo-Iranian languages are Indo-Aryan, Iranian, and Nuristani. A fourth independent branch, Dardic, was previously posited, but recent scholarship in general places Dardic languages as archaic members of the Indo-Aryan branch.

==== Indo-Aryan ====
Majority of the languages spoken in eastern regions of Pakistan belong to the Indo-Aryan group.

Modern Indo-Aryan languages descend from Old Indo-Aryan languages such as early Vedic Sanskrit, through Middle Indo-Aryan languages (or Prakrits).

Some of the important languages in this family are dialect continuums. One of these is Lahnda, and includes Saraiki (spoken mostly in southern Pakistani Punjab by about 26 million people), the diverse varieties of Hindko (with almost five million speakers in north-western Punjab and neighbouring regions of Khyber Pakhtunkhwa, especially Hazara), Pahari/Pothwari (3.5 million speakers in the Pothohar region of Punjab, Azad Kashmir and parts of Indian Jammu and Kashmir), Khetrani (20,000 speakers in Balochistan), and Inku (a possibly extinct language of Afghanistan).

==== Iranian ====
Majority of the languages spoken in western regions of Pakistan belong to the Iranic group. There are several dialects continuums in this family as well: Balochi, which includes Eastern, Western and Southern Balochi; and Pashto, and includes Northern, Central, and Southern Pashto.

=== Other ===
The following three languages of Pakistan are not part of the Indo-European language family:

- Brahui (spoken in central Balochistan province) is a Dravidian language. Its vocabulary has been significantly influenced by Balochi. It is an individual language in the Dravidian language family and does not belong to any subgrouping in that language family.
- The Balti, Ladakhi and Purgi (spoken in an area of southern Gilgit–Baltistan) are Tibetan languages of the Tibeto-Burman language family.
- The Kyrgyz language, particularly that of the Pamir Kyrgyz dialect (spoken in Broghil and Gojal) is a Kipchak language of the Common Turkic language family.
- Burushaski (spoken in Hunza, Nagar, Yasin, and Ishkoman valleys in Gilgit–Baltistan) is a language isolate with no indigenous written script and instead currently uses Urdu script, based on the Perso-Arabic script.

== Writing systems ==
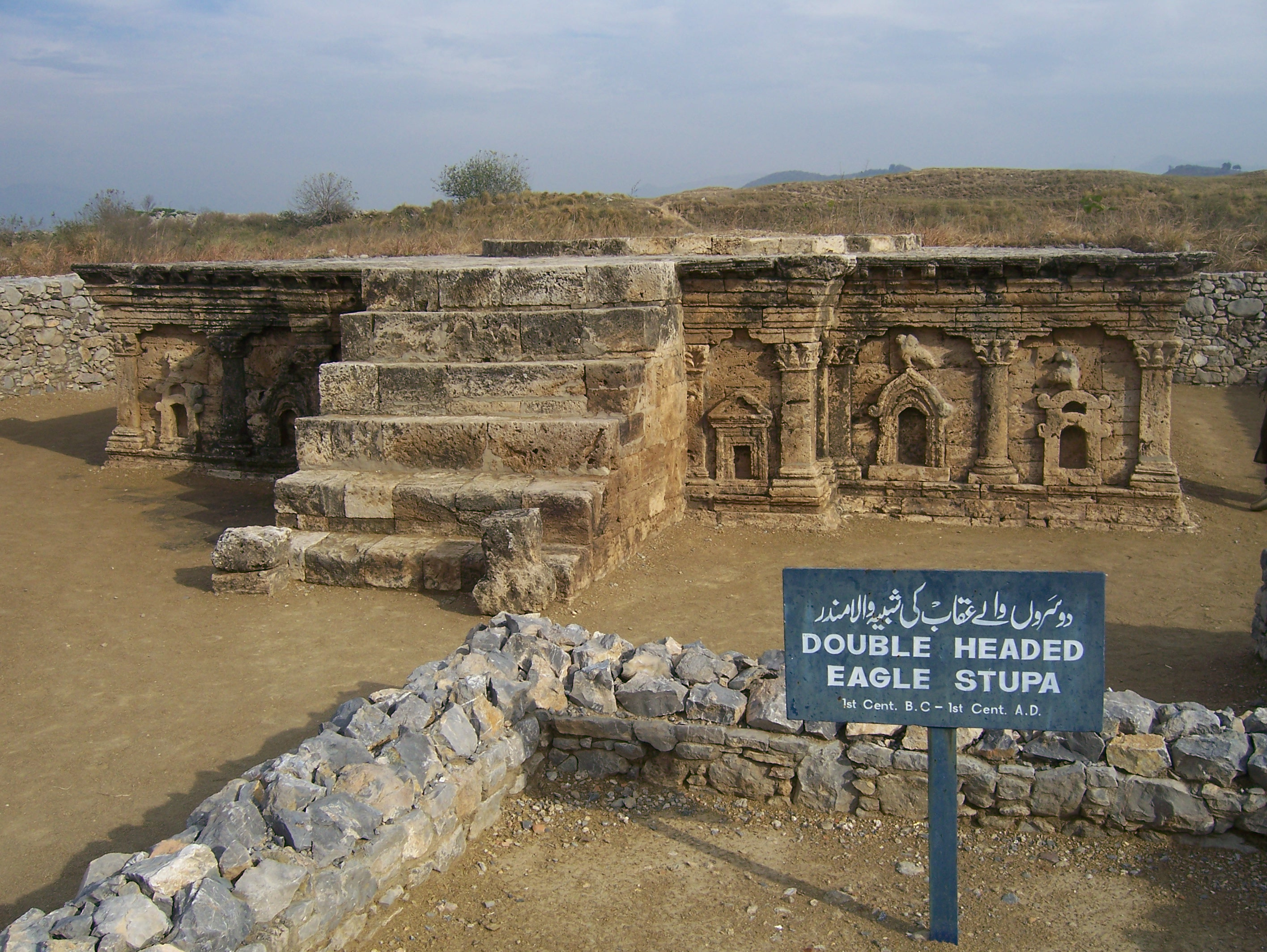
An English-Urdu bilingual sign at the archaeological site of Sirkap, near Taxila. The Urdu says: (right to left) دو سروں والے عقاب کی شبيہ والا مندر, dō sarōñ wālé u'qāb kī shabīh wāla mandir. "The temple with the image of the eagle with two heads."

Most languages of Pakistan are written in the Perso-Arabic script. The Mughal Empire adopted Persian as the court language during their rule over South Asia as did their predecessors, such as the Ghaznavids. During this time, the Nastaʿlīq style of the Perso-Arabic script came into widespread use in South Asia, and the influence remains to this day. In Pakistan, almost everything in Urdu is written in the script, concentrating the greater part of Nastaʿlīq usage in the world.

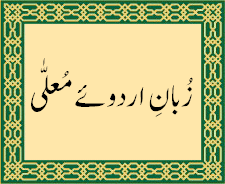
The phrase zubān-e-Urdū-e-muʿallā ("the language of the exalted camp") written in Nastaʿlīq script

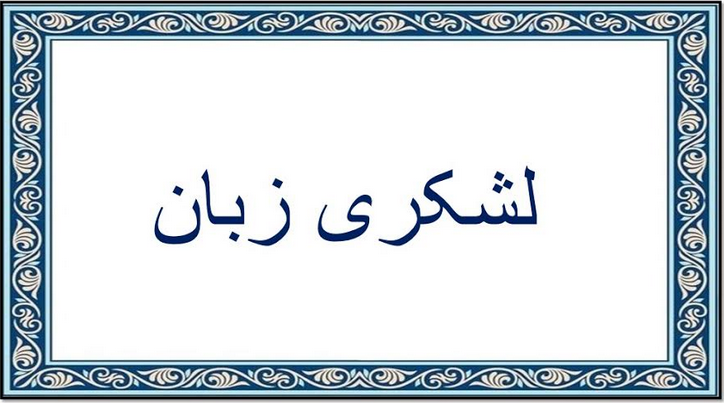
Lashkari Zabān title in Naskh script

The Urdu alphabet is a right-to-left alphabet. It is a modification of the Persian alphabet, which is itself a derivative of the Arabic alphabet. With 38 letters, the Urdu alphabet is typically written in the calligraphic Nasta'liq script.

Sindhi adopted a variant of the Persian alphabet as well, in the 19th century. The script is used in Pakistan today, albeit unlike most other native languages of Pakistan, the Naskh style is more common for Sindhi writing than the Nasta'liq style. It has a total of 52 letters, augmenting the Urdu with digraphs and eighteen new letters (ڄ ٺ ٽ ٿ ڀ ٻ ڙ ڍ ڊ ڏ ڌ ڇ ڃ ڦ ڻ ڱ ڳ ڪ) for sounds particular to Sindhi and other Indo-Aryan languages. Some letters that are distinguished in Arabic or Persian are homophones in Sindhi.

Balochi and Pashto are written in Perso-Arabic script.

The Shahmukhī script, a variant of the Urdu alphabet, is used to write the Punjabi language in Pakistan though it is not in common use these days.

Usually, bare transliterations of Urdu into Roman letters, Roman Urdu, omit many phonemic elements that have no equivalent in English or other languages commonly written in the Latin script. The National Language Authority of Pakistan has developed a number of systems with specific notations to signify non-English sounds, but these can only be properly read by someone already familiar with Urdu.

== Maps ==
This is a series of maps which shows the distribution of different languages in Pakistan as of 2017 Pakistan Census and 2023 Pakistani Census. These all refer to the mother tongues of individuals only.

Dominant Mother Tongue in each Pakistani District as of the 2017 Pakistan Census

Percent speaking Punjabi natively

Percent speaking Pashto natively

Percent speaking Sindhi natively

Percent speaking Saraiki natively

Percent speaking Urdu natively

Percent speaking Balochi natively

Percent speaking Hindko natively

Percent speaking Brahui natively

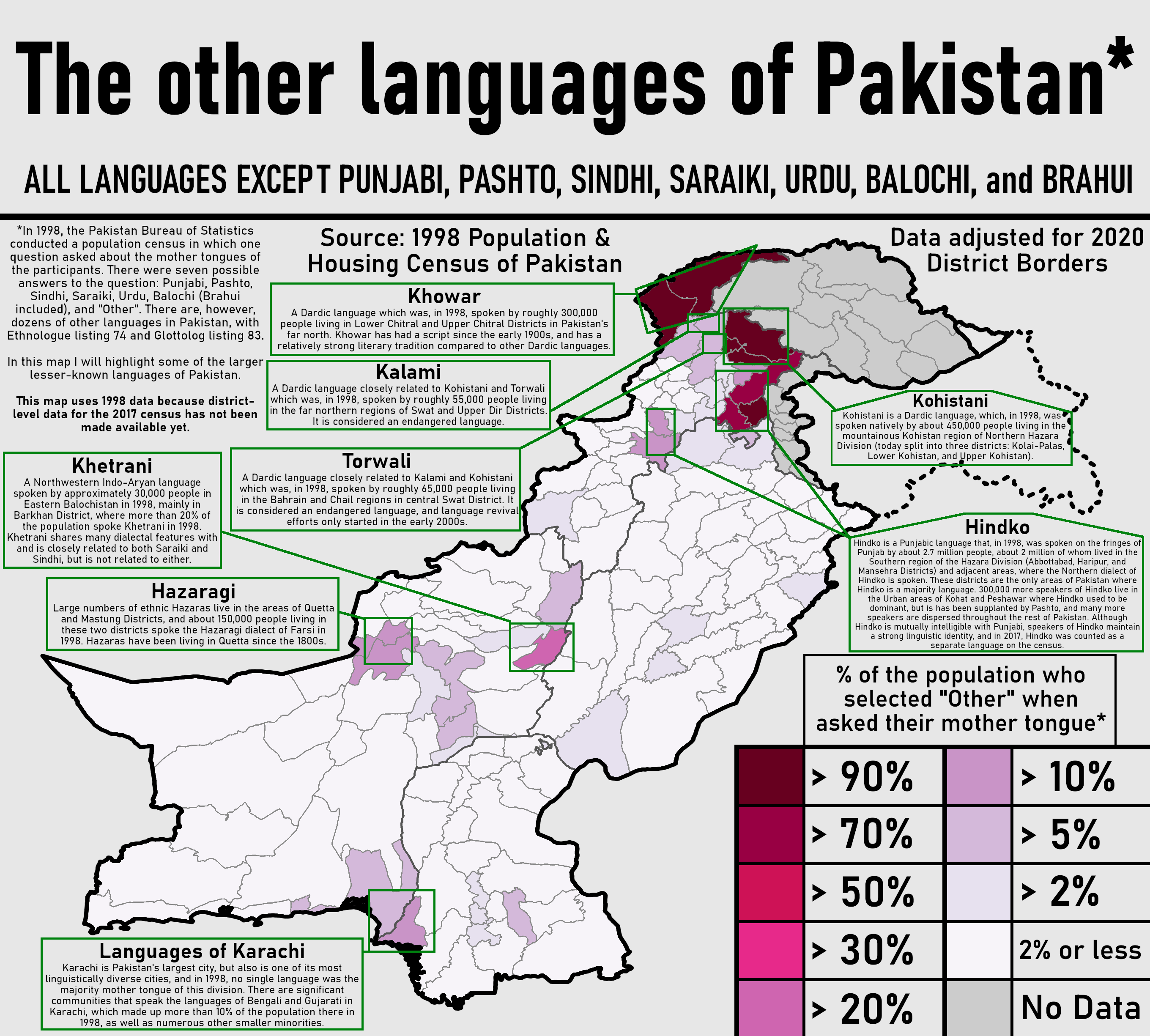
Percent speaking a minor language (not collected on the census) natively in 1998.

== See also ==
- Demographics of Pakistan
- Ethnic groups in Pakistan
- Pakistani People
- Romanisation of Urdu
- National Language Promotion Department
- List of districts of Pakistan by number of households

== Bibliography ==
- Baart, Joan L. G. (2003). Sustainable Development and the Maintenance of Pakistan's Indigenous Languages. Islamabad.
- Backstrom, Peter C.; Radloff, Carla F. (1992). O’Leary, Clare F. (ed.). Languages of Northern Areas. Sociolinguistic Survey of Northern Pakistan. Vol. 2. Quaid-i-Azam University: National Institute of Pakistani Studies. ISBN 9698023127.
- Bahl, Parmanand (1936). Étude de phonetique historique et experimentale des consonnes injectives du Multani, dialecte panjabi occidental. Paris: Adrien-Maisonneuve.
- Eberhard, David M; Simons, Gary F.; Fennig, Charles D., eds. (2022). "Pakistan". Ethnologue: Languages of the World (25 ed.). Dallas, Texas: SIL International.
- Lothers, Michael; Lothers, Laura (2010). Pahari and Pothwari: A Sociolinguistic Survey (Report). SIL Electronic Survey Reports. Vol. 2010–012.
- Parkin, Robert (1989). "Some comments on Brahui kinship terminology". Indo-Iranian Journal. 32 (1): 37–43. doi:10.1163/000000089790082944. JSTOR 24654607. S2CID 161638780.
- Rahman, Tariq (1996) Language and Politics of Pakistan Karachi: Oxford University Press. New Delhi: Orient Blackswan, 2007.
- Rahman, Tariq (2002) Language, Ideology and Power: Language-learning among the Muslims of Pakistan and North India Karachi: Oxford University Press. Rev.ed. New Delhi: Orient Blackswan, 2008.
- Rahman, Tariq (2011) From Hindi to Urdu: A Social and Political History Karachi: Oxford University Press.
- Rahman, Tariq (1995). "The Siraiki Movement in Pakistan". Language Problems & Language Planning. 19 (1): 1–25. doi:10.1075/lplp.19.1.01rah.
- —— (2014b). "Siraiki language". Encyclopædia Britannica.
- —— (1977). "Siraiki: A Language Movement in Pakistan". Modern Asian Studies. 11 (3): 379–403. doi:10.1017/s0026749x00014190. ISSN 0026-749X. JSTOR 311504. S2CID 144829301.
- Rahman, Tariq (1996). Language and politics in Pakistan. Oxford University Press. ISBN 978-0-19-577692-8.
- Shackle, Christopher (1976). The Siraiki language of central Pakistan : a reference grammar. London: School of Oriental and African Studies.
- Rensch, Calvin R. (1992). "The Language Environment of Hindko-Speaking People". In O'Leary, Clare F.; Rensch, Calvin R.; Hallberg, Calinda E. (eds.). Hindko and Gujari. Sociolinguistic Survey of Northern Pakistan. Islamabad: National Institute of Pakistan Studies, Quaid-i-Azam University and Summer Institute of Linguistics. ISBN 969-8023-13-5.
- Shackle, Christopher (1979). "Problems of classification in Pakistan Panjab". Transactions of the Philological Society. 77 (1): 191–210. doi:10.1111/j.1467-968X.1979.tb00857.x. ISSN 0079-1636.
- Shackle, Christopher (1980). "Hindko in Kohat and Peshawar". Bulletin of the School of Oriental and African Studies. 43 (3): 482–510. doi:10.1017/S0041977X00137401. ISSN 0041-977X. S2CID 129436200.
- Simons, Gary F.; Fennig, Charles D., eds. (2017). "Pahari-Potwari". Ethnologue (20 ed.). (access limited).
