= Shinaki =

Shinaki is a Shina language term used for the areas inhabited by the Shina people in northern Pakistan. The term "kui" or "ki" in Shina language means "settlement (of)", hence Shinaki literally means "Shina settlement" or "land of the Shins.

It is traditionally used for the areas of Gor, Chilas, Tangir, Darel and the Shinaki Kohistan, all of which existed as independent tribal republics of Hazara and Gilgit Agencies during the colonial period. In its widest sense Shinaki encompasses all the Shina-inhabited regions, thus in addition to above regions includes Astore, Gilgit, Koh, Ghizer and the lower valley of Hunza (also known as Shinaki).

== See also ==
- Baltistan
- Brushal
