= Kohistani Shina =

Indo-Aryan language of northern Pakistan

- Kohistani, Kohistyo, Palasi-Kohistani
- ݜݨیاٗ کستِین٘و زبان / ݜݨیاٗ زبان
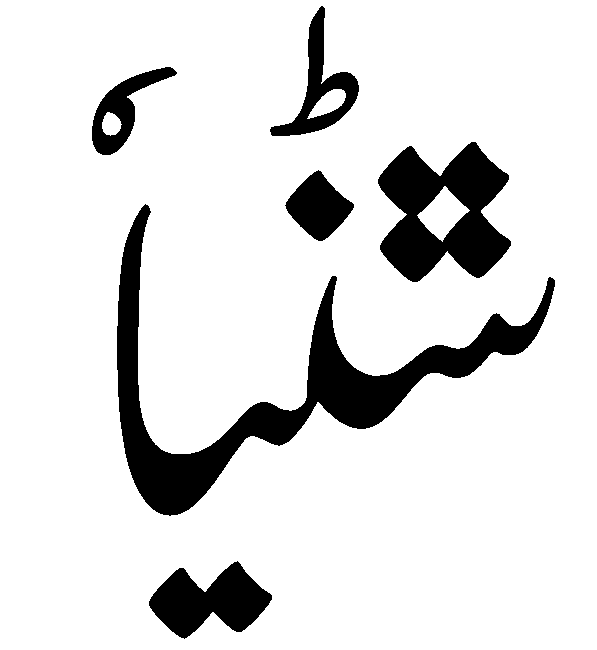
- 'Shina' (Ṣiṇyaá) written in the Perso-Arabic script (Nastaliq)
- Native to: Pakistan
- Region: Kohistan District, Pakistan
- Native speakers: 458,000 (2018)
- Language family: Indo-European: Indo-Iranian; Indo-Aryan; Eastern Dardic; Shinaic; Kohistani–Ushoji Shina; Kohistani Shina
- Dialects: Palas Valley; Jalkoti; Kolai
- Writing system: Perso-Arabic script (Nastaliq)

Language codes
- ISO 639-3: plk
- Glottolog: kohi1248

Kohistani Shina is a dialect of Shina language spoken in the former Kohistan District of Khyber Pakhtunkhwa, northern Pakistan. Bateri and Kalkoti speakers speak Kohistani Shina as a second language. Indus Kohistani loanwords can be found in the language. A grammar and a dictionary of the language have been published.

== Alphabet ==
Shina is one of the few Dardic languages with a written tradition. However, it was an unwritten language until a few decades ago. Only in late 2010s has Shina orthography been standardized and primers as well as dictionaries have been published.

Since the first attempts at accurately representing Shina's phonology in the 1960s there have been several proposed orthographies for the different varieties of the language, with debates centering on how to write several retroflex sound not present in Urdu and whether vowel length and tone should be represented.

There are two main orthographic conventions now, one in Pakistani-controlled areas of Gilgit-Baltistan and in Kohistan, and the other in Indian-controlled area of Dras, Ladakh.

Below alphabet has been standardized, documented, and popularized thanks to efforts of literaturists such as Professor Muhammad Amin Ziya, Shakeel Ahmad Shakeel, and Razwal Kohistani, and it has been developed for all Shina language dialects, including Gilgit dialect and Kohistani dialect, which The Kohistani Shina alphabet differs slightly from the Gilgiti variety. For example, it includes one additional letter ڦ, and it includes several additional digraphs to represent additional aspirated consonants unique to Kohistani. Furthermore, variations and personal preferences can be observed across Shina documents. For example, it is common to see someone use سً instead of ݜ for [ʂ], or use sukun ◌ْ (U+0652) instead of small sideway noon ◌ࣿ (U+08FF) to indicate short vowels. However, these variations are no longer an issue. Another issue is that of how to write loanwords that use letters not found in Shina language, for example letters "س / ث / ص", which all sound like [s] in Shina. Some documents preserve the original spelling, despite the letters being homophones and not having any independent sound of their own, similar to orthographic conventions of Persian and Urdu. Whereas other documents prefer to rewrite all loanwords in a single Shina letter, and thus simplify the writing, similar to orthographic conventions of Kurdish and Uyghur.

Shina vowels are distinguished by length, by whether or not they're nasalized, and by tone. Nasalization is represented like other Perso-Arabic alphabets in Pakistan, with Nun Ghunna (ن٘ـ / ـن٘ـ / ں). In Shina, tone variation only occur when there is a long vowel. There are conventions unique to Shina to show the three tones. In Shina conventions, specific diacritics are shown in conjunction with the letters aliv, waaw, buṛi ye, and ye (ا، و، یـ، ی، ے), as these letters are written down to represent long vowels. The diacritics inverted damma ◌ٗ (U+0657) and superscript alef ◌ٰ (U+0670) represent a rising tone and a falling tone respectively. Another diacritic, a small sideway noon ◌ࣿ (U+08FF) is used to represent short vowels when need be.

=== Consonants ===
Below table shows Shina consonants.

Name	Forms				IPA	Transliteration	Unicode	Notes
Shina	Isolated	Final	Medial	Initial	IPA	Transliteration	Unicode	Notes
الڦ aliv	ا	ـا	ـا	ا / آ	[ʌ], [∅], silent	– / aa	U+0627; U+0627	At the beginning of a word it can either come with diacritic, or it can come in form of aliv-madda (آ), or it can be stand-alone and silent, succeeded by a vowel letter. Diacritics اَ اِ، اُ can be omitted in writing.
بےࣿ be	ب	ـب	ـبـ	بـ	[b]	b	U+0628	
پےࣿ pe	پ	ـپ	ـپـ	پـ	[p]	p	U+067E	
تےࣿ te	ت	ـت	ـتـ	تـ	[t̪]	t	U+062A	
ٹےࣿ te	ٹ	ـٹ	ـٹـ	ٹـ	[ʈ]	ṭ	U+0679	
ثےࣿ se	ث	ـث	ـثـ	ثـ	[s]	s	U+062B	Only used in loanwords of Arabic origin. Can be replaced with letter siin س.
جوࣿم ǰom	ج	ـج	ـجـ	جـ	[d͡ʒ]	ǰ	U+062C	
چےࣿ če	چ	ـچ	ـچـ	چـ	[t͡ʃ]	č	U+0686	
څےࣿ tse	څ	ـڅ	ـڅـ	څـ	[t͡s]	ts	U+0685	Letter borrowed from Pashto alphabet.
ڇےࣿ c̣e	ڇ	ـڇ	ـڇـ	ڇـ	[ʈ͡ʂ]	c̣	U+0687	Unique letter for Shina language. Some Shina literatures and documents use two horizontal lines instead of four dots, use حٍـ instead of ڇـ.
حےࣿ he	ح	ـح	ـحـ	حـ	[h]	h	U+062D	Only used in loanwords of Arabic origin. Can be replaced with letter hay ہ.
خےࣿ khe	خ	ـخ	ـخـ	خـ	[x]~[kʰ]	kh	U+062E	Only used in loanwords of Arabic origin. Can be replaced with digraph letter khe کھ.
دال daal	د	ـد	-	-	[d̪]	d	U+062F	
ڈال ḍaal	ڈ	ـڈ	-	-	[ɖ]	ḍ	U+0688	
ذال zaal	ذ	ـذ	-	-	[z]	z	U+0630	Only used in loanwords of Arabic origin. Can be replaced with letter ze ز.
رےࣿ re	ر	ـر	-	-	[r]	r	U+0631	
ڑےࣿ ṛe	ڑ	ـڑ	-	-	[ɽ]	ṛ	U+0691	
زےࣿ ze	ز	ـز	-	-	[z]	z	U+0632	
ژےࣿ že / ǰe	ژ	ـژ	-	-	[ʒ]‍~[d͡ʒ]‍	ž / ǰ	U+0632	Only used in loanwords of Persian and European origin. Can be replaced with letter jom ج.
ڙےࣿ ẓe	ڙ	ـڙ	-	-	[ʐ]	ẓ	U+0699	Unique letter for Shina language. Some Shina literatures and documents use two horizontal lines instead of four dots, use رً instead of ڙ.
سِین siin	س	ـس	ـسـ	سـ	[s]	s	U+0633	
شِین šiin	ش	ـش	ـشـ	شـ	[ʃ]	š	U+0634	
ݜِین ṣiin	ݜ	ـݜ	ـݜـ	ݜـ	[ʂ]	ṣ	U+075C	Unique letter for Shina language. Some Shina literatures and documents use two horizontal lines instead of four dots, use سً instead of ݜ.
صواد swaad	ص	ـص	ـصـ	صـ	[s]	s	U+0635	Only used in loanwords of Arabic origin. Can be replaced with letter siin س.
ضواد zwaad	ض	ـض	ـضـ	ضـ	[z]	z	U+0636	Only used in loanwords of Arabic origin. Can be replaced with letter ze ز.
طوے tooy	ط	ـط	ـطـ	طـ	[t̪]	t	U+0637	Only used in loanwords of Arabic origin. Can be replaced with letter te ت.
ظوے zooy	ظ	ـظ	ـظـ	ظـ	[z]	z	U+0638	Only used in loanwords of Arabic origin. Can be replaced with letter ze ز.
عَین ayn	ع	ـع	ـعـ	عـ	[ʔ], silent	-	U+0639	Only used in loanwords of Arabic origin. Can be replaced with letter aliv ا.
غَین gayn	غ	ـغ	ـغـ	غـ	[ɣ]~[ɡ]	g	U+063A	Only used in loanwords of Arabic and Turkic origin. Can be replaced with letter gaaf گ.
فےࣿ fe / phe	ف	ـف	ـفـ	فـ	[f]~[pʰ]	f / ph	U+0641	Only used in loanwords. Can be replaced with digraph letter phe پھ.
ڦےࣿ ve	ڦ	ـڦ	ـڦـ	ڦـ	[v]	v	U+06A6	Unique letter for Shina language. Some Shina literatures and documents use two horizontal lines instead of four dots, use ڡً instead of ڦ.
قاف qaaf / kaaf	ق	ـق	ـقـ	قـ	[q]~[k]	q / k	U+0642	Only used in loanwords of Arabic and Turkic origin. Can be replaced with letter kaaf ک.
کاف kaaf	ک	ـک	ـکـ	کـ	[k]	k	U+0643	
گاف gaaf	گ	ـگ	ـگـ	گـ	[ɡ]	g	U+06AF	
ڱاف / گاف گُنَہ ngaaf / gaaf gunna	ڱ	ـڱ	ـڱـ	ڱـ	/ŋ/	ng	U+06B1	Unique letter for Kohistani Shina language.
لام laam	ل	ـل	ـلـ	لـ	[l]	l	U+0644	
مِیم miim	م	ـم	ـمـ	مـ	[m]	m	U+0645	
نُون nuun	ن	ـن	ـنـ	نـ	[n]	n	U+0646	
نُوݨ nuuṇ	ݨ	ـݨ	ـݨـ	ݨـ	[ɳ]	ṇ	U+0768	
نُوں / نُون گُنَہ nū̃ / nūn gunna	ں / ن٘	ـں	ـن٘ـ	ن٘ـ	/◌̃/	◌̃	For middle of word: U+0646 plus U+0658; For end of word: U+06BA	
واؤ waaw	و / او	ـو	-	-	[oː] / [w]	w / ō	U+0648	The letter waaw can either represent consonant ([w/v]) or vowel ([oo]). It can also act as a carrier of vowel diacritics, representing several other vowels. At the beginning of a word, when representing a consonant, the letter waaw will appear as a standalone character, followed by the appropriate vowel. If representing a vowel at the beginning of a word, the letter waaw needs to be preceded by an aliv ا. When the letter waaw comes at the end of the word representing a consonant sound [w], a hamza is used ؤ to label it as such and avoid mispronunciation as a vowel.
ہَے hai	ہ	ـہ	ـہـ	ہـ	[h]	h	U+0646	This letter differs from do-ac̣hi'ii hay (ھ) and they are not interchangeable. Similar to Urdu,do-chashmi hē (ھ) is exclusively used as a second part of digraphs for representing aspirated consonants. In initial and medial position, the letter hē always represents the consonant [h]. In final position, The letter hē can either represent consonant ([h]) or it can demonstrate that the word ends with short vowels a ◌َہ / ـَہ, i ◌ِہ / ـِہ, u ◌ُہ / ـُہ.
ہَمزَہ hamza	ء	-	-	-	[ʔ], silent	’	U+0621	Used mid-word to indicate separation between a syllable and another that starts with a vowel. hamza on top of letters waaw and ye at end of a word serves a function too. When the letter waaw or ye come at the end of the word representing a consonant sound [w] or [y], a hamza is used ؤ / ئ / ـئ to label it as such and avoid mispronunciation as a vowel.
یےࣿ / لیکھی یےࣿ ye / leekhii ye	ی	ـی	ـیـ	یـ	[j] / [e] / [i]	y / e / i	U+06CC	The letter ye can either represent consonant ([j]) or vowels ([e]/[i]). It can also act as a carrier of vowel diacritics, representing several other vowels. At the beginning of a word, when representing a consonant, the letter ye will appear as a standalone character, followed by the appropriate vowel. If representing a vowel at the beginning of a word, the letter ye needs to be preceded by an aliv ا. When the letter ye comes at the end of the word representing a consonant sound [j], a hamza is used ئ to label it as such and avoid mispronunciation as a vowel. When representing a vowel at the end of a word, it can only be [i]. For vowel [e], the letter buṛi ye ے is used.
بُڑیࣿ یےࣿ buṛi ye	ے	ـے	-	-	[e] / [j]	e / y	U+06D2	The letter buṛi ye only occurs in final position. The letter buṛi ye represents the vowel "ē" [eː] or the consonant "y" [j].
بھےࣿ bhe	بھ	ـبھ	ـبھـ	بھـ	[bʱ]	bh	U+0628 and U+06BE	A digraph, counted as a letter.
پھےࣿ phe	پھ	ـپھ	ـپھـ	پھـ	[pʰ]	ph	U+067E and U+06BE	A digraph, counted as a letter.
تھےࣿ the	تھ	ـتھ	ـتھـ	تھـ	[t̪ʰ]	th	U+062A and U+06BE	A digraph, counted as a letter.
ٹھےࣿ ṭhe	ٹھ	ـٹھ	ـٹھـ	ٹھـ	[ʈʰ]	ṭh	U+0679 and U+06BE	A digraph, counted as a letter.
جھوࣿم ǰhom	جھ	ـجھ	ـجھـ	جھـ	[d͡ʒʱ]	ǰh	U+062C and U+06BE	A digraph, counted as a letter.
چھےࣿ čhe	چھ	ـچھ	ـچھـ	چھـ	[t͡ʃʰ]	čh	U+0686 and U+06BE	A digraph, counted as a letter.
څھےࣿ tshe	څھ	ـڅھ	ـڅھـ	څھـ	[t͡sʰ]	tsh	U+0685 and U+06BE	A digraph, counted as a letter.
ڇھےࣿ c̣he	ڇھ	ـڇھ	ـڇھـ	ڇھـ	[ʈ͡ʂʰ]	c̣h	U+0687 and U+06BE	A digraph, counted as a letter.
دھےࣿ dhe	دھ	ـدھ	ـدھـ	دھـ	[d̪ʱ]	dh	U+062F and U+06BE	A digraph, counted as a letter.
ڈھےࣿ ḍhe	ڈھ	ـڈھ	ـڈھـ	ڈھـ	[ɖʱ]	ḍh	U+0688 and U+06BE	A digraph, counted as a letter.
رھےࣿ rhe	رھ	ـرھ	ـرھـ	رھـ	[rʱ]	rh	U+0631 and U+06BE	A digraph, counted as a letter.
زھےࣿ zhe	زھ	ـزھ	ـزھـ	زھـ	[zʱ]	zh	U+0632 and U+06BE	A digraph, counted as a letter.
ڙھےࣿ ẓhe	ڙھ	ـڙھ	ـڙھـ	ڙھـ	[zʱ]	ẓh	U+0699 and U+06BE	A digraph, counted as a letter.
کھےࣿ khe	کھ	ـکھ	ـکھـ	کھـ	[kʰ]	kh	U+0643 and U+06BE	A digraph, counted as a letter.
گھےࣿ ghe	گھ	ـگھ	ـگھـ	گھـ	[ɡʱ]	gh	U+06AF and U+06BE	A digraph, counted as a letter.
لھےࣿ lhe	لھ	ـلھ	ـلھـ	لھـ	[lʱ]	lh	U+0644 and U+06BE	A digraph, counted as a letter.
مھےࣿ mhe	مھ	ـمھ	ـمھـ	مھـ	[mʱ]	mh	U+0645 and U+06BE	A digraph, counted as a letter.
نھےࣿ nhe	نھ	ـنھ	ـنھـ	نھـ	[nʱ]	nh	U+0646 and U+06BE	A digraph, counted as a letter.

=== Vowels ===
There are five vowels in Kohistani Shina language. Each of the five vowels in Kohistani Shina have a short version and a long version. Shina is also a tonal language. Short vowels in Shina have a short high level tone ˥. Long vowels can either have "no tone", i.e. a long flat tone ˧, a long rising tone [˨˦], or a long falling tone (/˥˩/.

All five vowels have a defined way of presentation in Kohistani Shina orthographic conventions, including letters and diacritics. Although diacritics can and are occasionally dropped in writing. Short vowels [a], [i], and [u] are solely written with diacritics. Short vowels [e] and [o] are written with letters waw and buṛi ye. A unique diacritic, a small sideway noon ◌ࣿ (U+08FF) is used on top of these letters to indicate a short vowel. Long vowels are written with a combination of diacritics and letters aliv, waaw or ye.

Below table shows short vowels at the beginning, middle, and end of a word.

Vowel at the beginning of the word
a	e	i	o	u
اَ	ایࣿـ / اےࣿ	اِ	اوࣿ	اُ
Vowel at the middle of the word
ـَ	یࣿـ / ـیࣿـ	ـِ	وࣿ / ـوࣿ	ـُ
Vowel at the end of the word
◌َہ / ـَہ	ےࣿ / ـےࣿ	◌ِہ / ـِہ	وࣿ / ـوࣿ	◌ُہ / ـُہ

Below table shows long vowels at the beginning, middle, and end of a word, with "no tone", i.e. a long flat tone ˧.

Vowel at the beginning of the word
aa	ee	ii	oo	uu
آ	ایـ / اے	اِیـ / اِی	او	اُو
Vowel at the middle of the word
ا / ـا	یـ / ـیـ	◌ِیـ / ـِیـ	و / ـو	◌ُو / ـُو
Vowel at the end of the word
ا / ـا	ے / ـے	◌ِی / ـِی	و / ـو	◌ُو / ـُو

Below table shows long vowels at the beginning, middle, and end of a word, with a long rising tone [˨˦].

Vowel at the beginning of the word
aá	eé	ií	oó	uú
آٗ	ایٗـ / اےٗ	اِیٗـ / اِیٗ	اوٗ	اُوٗ
Vowel at the middle of the word
اٗ / ـاٗ	یٗـ / ـیٗـ	◌ِیٗـ / ـِیٗـ	وٗ / ـوٗ	◌ُوٗ / ـُوٗ
Vowel at the end of the word
اٗ / ـاٗ	ےٗ / ـےٗ	◌ِیٗ / ـِی	وٗ / ـوٗ	◌ُوٗ / ـُوٗ

Below table shows long vowels at the beginning, middle, and end of a word, with a long falling tone (/˥˩/.

Vowel at the beginning of the word
áa	ée	íi	óo	úu
آٰ	ایٰـ / اےٰ	اِیٰـ / اِیٰ	اوٰ	اُوٰ
Vowel at the middle of the word
اٰ / ـاٰ	یٰـ / ـیٰـ	◌ِیٰـ / ـِیٰـ	وٰ / ـوٰ	◌ُوٰ / ـُوٰ
Vowel at the end of the word
اٰ / ـاٰ	ےٰ / ـےٰ	◌ِیٰ / ـِیٰ	وٰ / ـوٰ	◌ُوٰ / ـُوٰ

== Sources ==
- Bashir, Elena L. (2003). "Dardic". In George Cardona; Dhanesh Jain (eds.). The Indo-Aryan languages. Routledge language family series. Y. London: Routledge. pp. 818–94. ISBN 978-0-7007-1130-7.
- Bashir, Elena L. (2016). "Perso-Arabic adaptions for South Asian languages". In Hock, Hans Henrich; Bashir, Elena (eds.). The languages and linguistics of South Asia: a comprehensive guide. World of Linguistics. Berlin: De Gruyter Mouton. pp. 803–9. ISBN 978-3-11-042715-8.
- Schmidt, Ruth Laila (2003–2004). "The oral history of the Daṛmá lineage of Indus Kohistan" (PDF). European Bulletin of Himalayan Research (25/26): 61–79. ISSN 0943-8254.
