= Palula =

Palula may refer to:

- Palula language, an Indo-Aryan language spoken in northern Pakistan
- Palula people, the ethnic group who speaks the language
