= Biori Valley =

Biori Valley بِھئُوڑیۡ
- Biori
- Location within Khyber Pakhtunkhwa Location within Pakistan
- Coordinates: 35°28′24″N 71°48′2″E
- Country: Pakistan
- Province: Khyber Pakhtunkhwa
- District: Upper Chitral District

Beori (Urdu: بھوڑی) is a valley located in Upper Chitral District, Khyber Pakhtunkhwa, Pakistan. It meets the Kunar River and there are three villages located in the valley, including Drosh. It is located at 35°28′24″N 71°48′2″E according to Henrik Liljegren, a linguist. It is located at the Hindu Raj range from the southeast. The Chitral River also meets the valley.

== Demography ==
The main language in Biori is the Palula language, spoken by the Palula people, which is also spoken in Ashret, but has died out in other places in Chitral, Dir, and Kohistan. There are also some speakers of Kalasha-mun.

== Villages ==
These are the villages in Biori:

- Mingal
- Dhamaret
- Bhiuri
