= Palula people =

Indo-Aryan ethnic group in Pakistan

Palula Ashreti
پالُولا بڙُو

Regions with significant populations
- Pakistan (Chitral): 17,000

Languages
- Palula, Khowar, Urdu

Religion
- Islam (Sunni)

Related ethnic groups
- Torwal, Kho, Kalash, Indus Kohistani

The Palula, or Dangerik (in Khowar), also known as the Ashreti or Biori (اڇٗرےٹی, بِھئُوڑیۡ) are an Indo-Aryan ethnic group who inhabit Ashret and parts of the former Chitral district, primarily in the south.

== History ==
The Palula people claim to be from Chilas, though this cannot be confirmed. They migrated over 500 years ago to Ashret, and brought their language, which at the time was the Chilas variety of Shina, which later diverged into Palula. It was said that the Mitar of Chitral had let them buy land in Ashret in which they agreed to the offer. Many Palulas left Ashret to Dir to fight in their armies. Many of the Palula's in Biori Valley are tribal. The Palulas have been historically known by the Khos as the Dangarik, with the Ashreti Palulas despising the name and the Biori Palulas accepting the name, some even calling themselves Dangarik. Ashreti Palulas also live isolated unlike the Biori who welcome the Kho and other Dards.

Between 1820 and 1840, the Palula people stopped giving their children native pre-Islamic names, and began giving their children Pashto Islamic names.

== Language ==
The Palula speak Palula, which in Ashret is known as Ashreti. Palula is a Dardic language of the Shina branch and is closely related Kalkoti, primarily the Biori variety.
