= Henrik Liljegren =

Henrik Liljegren may refer to:

- Henrik Liljegren (linguist)
- Henrik Liljegren (diplomat)
