= Shina language =

Indo-Aryan language primarily spoken in Gilgit-Baltistan, Kohistan and Ladakh

Shina
- Gilgiti
- ݜݨیاٗ Ṣiṇyaá
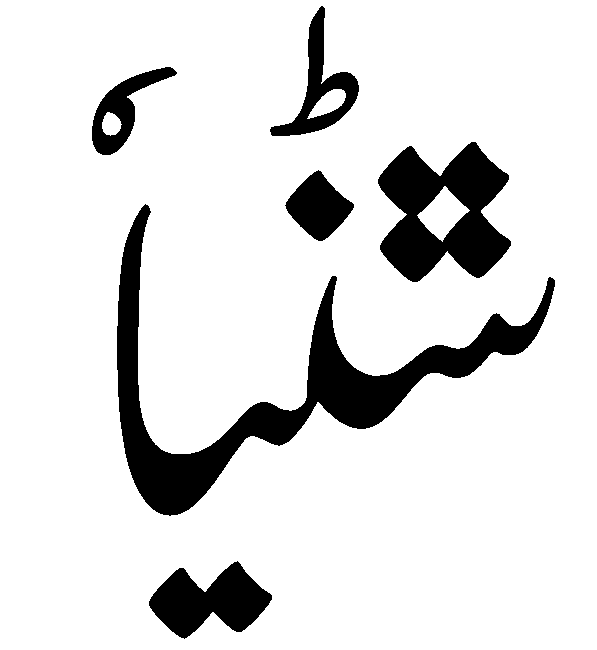
- 'Shina' (Ṣiṇyaá) written in the Arabic script (Nastaliq)
- Pronunciation: [ʂiɳjá]
- Native to: Pakistan, India
- Region: Gilgit-Baltistan, Kohistan, Drass, Gurez
- Ethnicity: Shina
- Native speakers: 1.1 million (2018)
- Language family: Indo-European: Indo-Iranian; Indo-Aryan; Dardic; Eastern Dardic; Shinaic; Shina
- Early forms: Proto-Indo-Aryan: Vedic Sanskrit
- Writing system: Arabic script (Nastaʿlīq) Devanagari script

Language codes
- ISO 639-3: Either: scl – Standard Shina plk – Kohistani Shina
- Glottolog: shin1264 Shina kohi1248 Kohistani Shina
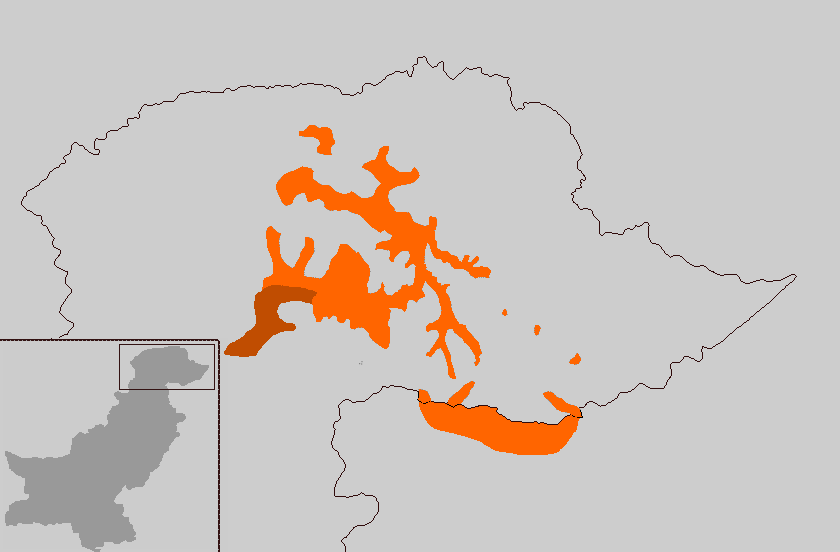
- Distribution of Shina language in Orange

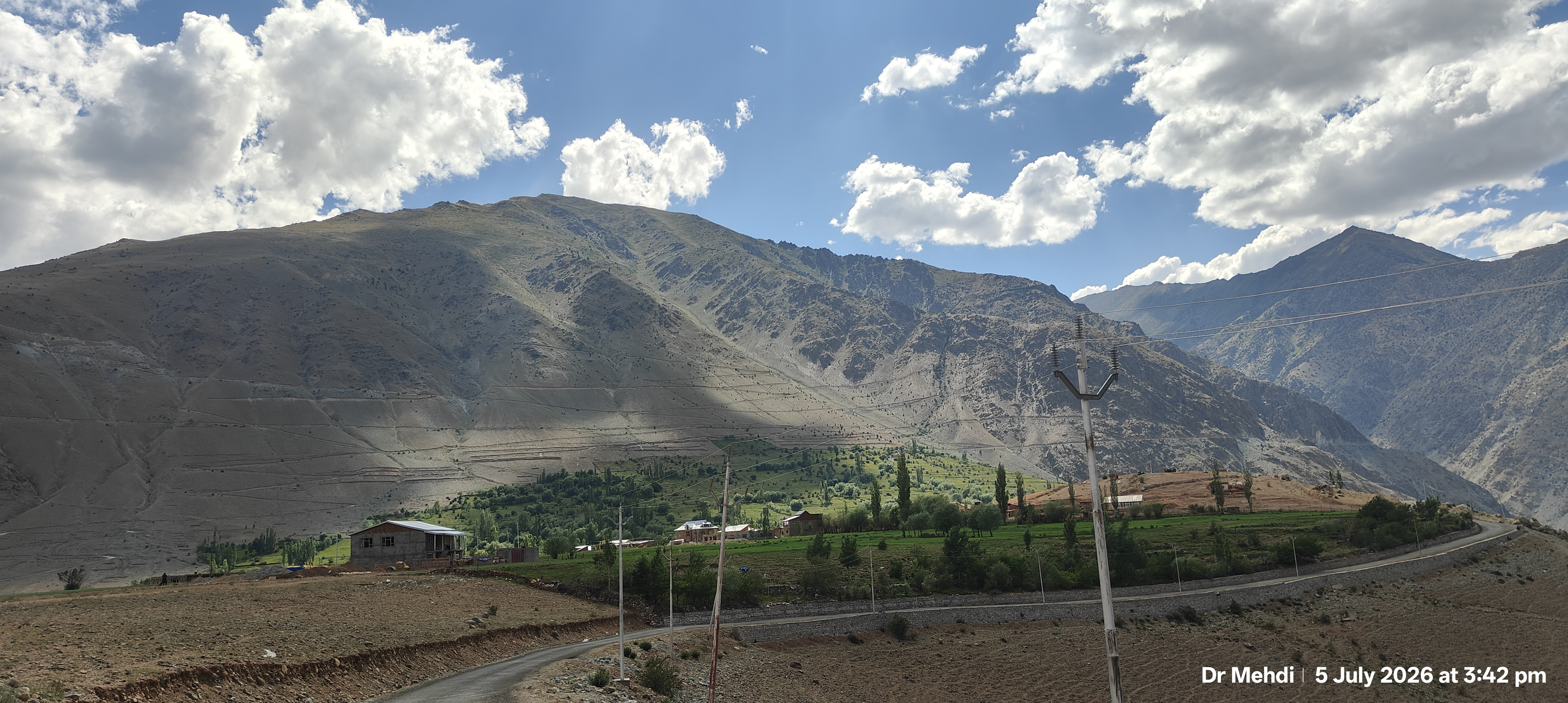
The Dard Sheen Community: Kaksar preserve the Shina Language, Traditions, and Cultural Heritage

Shina (ݜݨیاٗ, Ṣiṇyaá, [ʂiɳjá]), also known by its exonym Gilgiti, (Note: In linguistics, applied only to the dialect of Shina spoken in and around Gilgit) is an Indo-Aryan language of the Dardic branch, primarily spoken by the Shina people native to northern Pakistan, specifically Gilgit-Baltistan and Kohistan. A small community of Shina speakers is also found in in India, in the Gurez valley of Jammu and Kashmir and Dras valley of Ladakh. Outliers of Shina language such as Brokskat are found in Ladakh, Kundal Shahi in Azad Kashmir, Palula and Sawi in Chitral and Kunar, Ushojo in the Swat Valley and Kalkoti in Dir.

Until recently, there was no writing system for the language. A number of schemes have been proposed, but presently, there is no single writing system used by speakers of Shina. Shina is mostly a spoken language and not a written language.

Due to the effects of dominant languages in Pakistani media like Urdu and English, in addition to the religious significance of Arabic and Persian, Shina is continuously expanding its vocabulary base with loan words. This process is also ongoing with that of many other languages in Pakistan.

== Distribution ==
=== In Pakistan ===
There are an estimated 1,146,000 speakers of Shina in Pakistan according to Ethnologue (2018), a majority of whom reside in the provinces of Khyber Pakhtunkhwa and Gilgit-Baltistan. A small community of Shina speakers is also settled in the Neelam Valley of Azad Jammu and Kashmir.

=== In India ===
A small community of Shina speakers are also found in India. Their population is estimated to be around 32,200 according to the 2011 census. They are mostly settled in the far north of Drass district in Ladakh, bordering Gilgit-Baltistan. In the Vale of Kashmir, Shina people are found in Northern regions like Gurez of Bandipore district where they form the majority, along with some villages of Ganderbal district.

== Phonology ==
The following is a description of the phonology of the Drasi, Shina variety spoken in India and the Kohistani variety in Pakistan.

=== Vowels ===
The Shina principal vowel sounds:

	Front	Mid	Back	
	Front	Mid	unrd.	rnd.
High	i			u
High-mid	e			o
Low-mid	ɛ	ə	ʌ	ɔ
Low	(æ)	a		

All vowels except /ɔ/ can be either long or nasalized, though no minimal pairs with the contrast are found. /æ/ is heard from loanwords.

=== Diphthongs ===
In Shina there are the following diphthongs:

- falling: ae̯, ao̯, eə̯, ɛi̯, ɛːi̯, ue̯, ui̯, oi̯, oə̯;
- falling nasalized: ãi̯, ẽi̯, ũi̯, ĩũ̯, ʌĩ̯;
- raising: u̯i, u̯e, a̯a, u̯u.

=== Consonants ===
In India, the dialects of the Shina language have preserved both initial and final OIA consonant clusters, while the Shina dialects spoken in Pakistan have not.

		Labial	Coronal	Retroflex	Post-alv./ Palatal	Velar	Uvular	Glottal
Stop	Voiceless	p	t	ʈ		k	q (Note: Occurs in the Kohistani dialect, Schmidt (2008))	
Stop	Aspirated	pʰ	tʰ	ʈʰ		kʰ		
Stop	Voiced	b	d	ɖ		ɡ		
Stop	Breathy	bʱ	dʱ	ɖʱ		ɡʱ		
Affricate	Voiceless		t͡s	ʈ͡ʂ	t͡ʃ			
Affricate	Aspirated		t͡sʰ	ʈ͡ʂʰ	t͡ʃʰ			
Affricate	Voiced		d͡z (Note: According to Rajapurohit (2012, p. 33–34))		d͡ʒ			
Affricate	Breathy				d͡ʒʱ			
Fricative	Voiceless	(f)	s	ʂ	ʃ	x		h
Fricative	Voiced		z	ʐ	ʒ	ɣ		ɦ
Nasal		m (mʱ)	n	ɳ		ŋ		
Lateral			l (lʱ)					
Rhotic			r	ɽ (Note: Degener (2008, p. 14) lists it as a phoneme)				
Semivowel		ʋ~w			j			

=== Tone ===
Shina words are often distinguished by three contrasting tones: level, rising, and falling tones. Here is an example that shows the three tones:

"The" (تھےࣿ) has a level tone and means the imperative "Do!"

When the stress falls on the first mora of a long vowel, the tone is falling. Thée (تھےٰ) means "Will you do?"

When the stress falls on the second mora of a long vowel, the tone is rising. Theé (تھےٗ) means "after having done".

== Orthography ==
Shina is one of the few Dardic languages with a written tradition. However, it was an unwritten language until a few decades ago. Only in the late 2010s has Shina orthography been standardized, and primers as well as dictionaries endorsed by the government of Gilgit-Baltistan have been published.

Since the first attempts at accurately representing Shina's phonology in the 1960s, there have been several proposed orthographies for the different varieties of the language. Debates have centered on how to write several retroflex sounds not present in Urdu, and whether vowel length and tone should be represented.

There are two main orthographic conventions now, one in Pakistani-administered area of Gilgit-Baltistan and in Kohistan, and the other in Indian-administered area of Dras, Ladakh.

Below, the alphabet has been standardized, documented, and popularized thanks to the efforts of literaturists such as Professor Muhammad Amin Ziya, Shakeel Ahmad Shakeel, and Razwal Kohistani. The alphabet established by these individuals has been developed for all Shina language dialects, including the Gilgit dialect and the Kohistani dialect. There are minor differences, such as the existence of the letter ڦ in Kohistani dialect of Shina. Furthermore, variations and personal preferences can be observed across Shina documents. For example, it is common to see someone use سً instead of ݜ for [ʂ], or use sukun ◌ْ (U+0652) instead of small sideway noon ◌ࣿ (U+08FF) to indicate short vowels. However, these variations are no longer an issue. Another issue is that of how to write loanwords that use letters not found in Shina language, for example letters "س / ث / ص", which all sound like [s] in Shina. Some documents preserve the original spelling, despite the letters being homophones and not having any independent sound of their own, similar to orthographic conventions of Persian and Urdu. Whereas other documents prefer to rewrite all loanwords in a single Shina letter, and thus simplify the writing, similar to orthographic conventions of Kurdish and Uyghur.

Shina vowels are distinguished by length, by whether or not they're nasalized, and by tone. Nasalization is represented like other Perso-Arabic alphabets in Pakistan, with Nun Ghunna (ن٘ـ / ـن٘ـ / ں). In Shina, tone variation only occur when there is a long vowel. There are conventions unique to Shina to show the three tones. In Shina conventions, specific diacritics are shown in conjunction with the letters alif, waw, buṛi ye, and ye (ا، و، یـ، ی، ے), as these letters are written down to represent long vowels. The diacritics inverted damma ◌ٗ (U+0657) and superscript alef ◌ٰ (U+0670) represent a rising tone and a falling tone respectively. Another diacritic, a small sideway noon ◌ࣿ (U+08FF) is used to represent short vowels when need be.

=== Consonants ===
Below table shows Shina consonants.

Name	Forms				IPA	Transliteration	Unicode	Notes
Shina	Isolated	Final	Medial	Initial	IPA	Transliteration	Unicode	Notes
الف alif	ا	ـا		ا / آ	[ʌ], [∅], silent	– / aa	U+0622; U+0627	At the beginning of a word it can either come with diacritic, or it can come in form of alif-madda (آ), or it can be stand-alone and silent, succeeded by a vowel letter. Diacritics اَ اِ، اُ can be omitted in writing.
بےࣿ be	ب	ـب	ـبـ	بـ	[b]	b	U+0628	
پےࣿ pe	پ	ـپ	ـپـ	پـ	[p]	p	U+067E	
تےࣿ te	ت	ـت	ـتـ	تـ	[t̪]	t	U+062A	
ٹےࣿ te	ٹ	ـٹ	ـٹـ	ٹـ	[ʈ]	ṭ	U+0679	
ثےࣿ se	ث	ـث	ـثـ	ثـ	[s]	s	U+062B	Only used in loanwords of Arabic origin. Can be replaced with letter siin س.
جوࣿم ǰom	ج	ـج	ـجـ	جـ	[d͡ʒ]	ǰ	U+062C	
چےࣿ če	چ	ـچ	ـچـ	چـ	[t͡ʃ]	č	U+0686	
څےࣿ tse	څ	ـڅ	ـڅـ	څـ	[t͡s]	ts	U+0685	Letter borrowed from Pashto alphabet. In the official Shina orthography in Indian-Controlled Kashmir, the letter ژ is used.
ڇےࣿ c̣e	ڇ	ـڇ	ـڇـ	ڇـ	[ʈ͡ʂ]	c̣	U+0687	Unique letter for Shina language. Some Shina literatures and documents use two horizontal lines instead of four dots, use حٍـ instead of ڇـ. In the official Shina orthography in Indian-Controlled Kashmir, the letter چْ is used.
حےࣿ he	ح	ـح	ـحـ	حـ	[h]	h	U+062D	Only used in loanwords of Arabic origin. Can be replaced with letter hay ہ.
خےࣿ khe	خ	ـخ	ـخـ	خـ	[x]~[kʰ]	kh	U+062D	Only used in loanwords of Arabic origin. Can be replaced with digraph letter khe کھ.
دال daal	د	ـد	-		[d̪]	d	U+062F	
ڈال ḍaal	ڈ	ـڈ	-		[ɖ]	ḍ	U+0688	
ذال zaal	ذ	ـذ	-		[z]	z	U+0688	Only used in loanwords of Arabic origin. Can be replaced with letter ze ز.
رےࣿ re	ر	ـر	-		[r]	r	U+0631	
ڑےࣿ ṛe	ڑ	ـڑ	-		[ɽ]	ṛ	U+0691	
زےࣿ ze	ز	ـز	-		[z]	z	U+0632	
ژےࣿ že / ǰe	ژ	ـژ	-		[ʒ]‍~[d͡ʒ]‍	ž / ǰ	U+0632	Only used in loanwords of Persian and European origin. Can be replaced with letter jom ج.
ڙےࣿ ẓe	ڙ	ـڙ	-		[ʐ]	ẓ	U+0699	Unique letter for Shina language. Some Shina literatures and documents use two horizontal lines instead of four dots, use رً instead of ڙ. In the official Shina orthography in Indian-Controlled Kashmir, the letter جْ is used.
سِین siin	س	ـس	ـسـ	سـ	[s]	s	U+0633	
شِین šiin	ش	ـش	ـشـ	شـ	[ʃ]	š	U+0634	
ݜِین ṣiin	ݜ	ـݜ	ـݜـ	ݜـ	[ʂ]	ṣ	U+075C	Unique letter for Shina language. Some Shina literatures and documents use two horizontal lines instead of four dots, use سً instead of ݜ. In the official Shina orthography in Indian-Controlled Kashmir, the letter شْ is used.
صواد swaad	ص	ـص	ـصـ	صـ	[s]	s	U+0635	Only used in loanwords of Arabic origin. Can be replaced with letter siin س.
ضواد zwaad	ض	ـض	ـضـ	ضـ	[z]	z	U+0636	Only used in loanwords of Arabic origin. Can be replaced with letter ze ز.
طوے tooy	ط	ـط	ـطـ	طـ	[t̪]	t	U+0637	Only used in loanwords of Arabic origin. Can be replaced with letter te ت.
ظوے zooy	ظ	ـظ	ـظـ	ظـ	[z]	z	U+0638	Only used in loanwords of Arabic origin. Can be replaced with letter ze ز.
عَین ayn	ع	ـع	ـعـ	عـ	[ʔ], silent	-	U+0639	Only used in loanwords of Arabic origin. Can be replaced with letter alif ا.
غَین gayn	غ	ـغ	ـغـ	غـ	[ɣ]~[ɡ]	g	U+0639	Only used in loanwords of Arabic and Turkic origin. Can be replaced with letter gaaf گ.
فےࣿ fe / phe	ف	ـف	ـفـ	فـ	[f]~[pʰ]	f / ph	U+0641	Only used in loanwords. Can be replaced with digraph letter phe پھ.
قاف qaaf / kaaf	ق	ـق	ـقـ	قـ	[q]~[k]	q / k	U+0642	Only used in loanwords of Arabic and Turkic origin. Can be replaced with letter kaaf ک.
کاف kaaf	ک	ـک	ـکـ	کـ	[k]	k	U+0643	
گاف gaaf	گ	ـگ	ـگـ	گـ	[ɡ]	g	U+06AF	
لام laam	ل	ـل	ـلـ	لـ	[l]	l	U+0644	
مِیم miim	م	ـم	ـمـ	مـ	[m]	m	U+0645	
نُون nuun	ن	ـن	ـنـ	نـ	[n]	n	U+0646	
نُوݨ nuuṇ	ݨ	ـݨ	ـݨـ	ݨـ	[ɳ]	ṇ	U+0768	In the official Shina orthography in Indian-Controlled Kashmir, the letter نْ is used.
نُوں / نُون گُنَہ nū̃ / nūn gunna	ں / ن٘	ـں	ـن٘ـ	ن٘ـ	/◌̃/	◌̃	For middle of word: U+0646 plus U+0658; For end of word: U+06BA	
نُون٘گ nuung	ن٘گ	ـن٘گ	ـن٘گـ	ن٘گـ	/ŋ/	ng	U+0646 plus U+0658 and U+06AF	A digraph, counted as a letter.
واؤ waaw	و / او	ـو	-		[oː] / [w]	w / ō	U+0648	The letter waaw can either represent consonant ([w/v]) or vowel ([oo]). It can also act as a carrier of vowel diacritics, representing several other vowels. At the beginning of a word, when representing a consonant, the letter waaw will appear as a standalone character, followed by the appropriate vowel. If representing a vowel at the beginning of a word, the letter waaw needs to be preceded by an alif ا. When the letter waaw comes at the end of the word representing a consonant sound [w], a hamza is used ؤ to label it as such and avoid mispronunciation as a vowel.
ہَے hai	ہ	ـہ	ـہـ	ہـ	[h]	h	U+0646	This letter differs from do-ac̣hi'ii hay (ھ) and they are not interchangeable. Similar to Urdu,do-chashmi hē (ھ) is exclusively used as a second part of digraphs for representing aspirated consonants. In initial and medial position, the letter hē always represents the consonant [h]. In final position, The letter hē can either represent consonant ([h]) or it can demonstrate that the word ends with short vowels a ◌َہ / ـَہ, i ◌ِہ / ـِہ, u ◌ُہ / ـُہ.
ہَمزَہ hamza	ء	-			[ʔ], silent	’	U+0621	Used mid-word to indicate separation between a syllable and another that starts with a vowel. hamza on top of letters waaw and ye at end of a word serves a function too. When the letter waaw or ye come at the end of the word representing a consonant sound [w] or [y], a hamza is used ؤ / ئ / ـئ to label it as such and avoid mispronunciation as a vowel.
یےࣿ / لیکھی یےࣿ ye / leekhii ye	ی	ـی	ـیـ	یـ	[j] / [e] / [i]	y / e / i	U+06CC	The letter ye can either represent consonant ([j]) or vowels ([e]/[i]). It can also act as a carrier of vowel diacritics, representing several other vowels. At the beginning of a word, when representing a consonant, the letter ye will appear as a standalone character, followed by the appropriate vowel. If representing a vowel at the beginning of a word, the letter ye needs to be preceded by an alif ا. When the letter ye comes at the end of the word representing a consonant sound [j], a hamza is used ئ to label it as such and avoid mispronunciation as a vowel. When representing a vowel at the end of a word, it can only be [i]. For vowel [e], the letter buṛi ye ے is used.
بُڑیࣿ یےࣿ buṛi ye	ے	ـے	-		[e] / [j]	e / y	U+06D2	The letter buṛi ye only occurs in final position. The letter buṛi ye represents the vowel "ē" [eː] or the consonant "y" [j].
بھےࣿ bhe	بھ	ـبھ	ـبھـ	بھـ	[bʱ]	bh	U+0628 and U+06BE	Digraphs counted as letters.
پھےࣿ phe	پھ	ـپھ	ـپھـ	پھـ	[pʰ]	ph	U+067E and U+06BE	Digraphs counted as letters.
تھےࣿ the	تھ	ـتھ	ـتھـ	تھـ	[t̪ʰ]	th	U+062A and U+06BE	Digraphs counted as letters.
ٹھےࣿ ṭhe	ٹھ	ـٹھ	ـٹھـ	ٹھـ	[ʈʰ]	ṭh	U+0679 and U+06BE	Digraphs counted as letters.
جھوࣿم ǰhom	جھ	ـجھ	ـجھـ	جھـ	[d͡ʒʱ]	ǰh	U+062C and U+06BE	Digraphs counted as letters.
چھےࣿ čhe	چھ	ـچھ	ـچھـ	چھـ	[t͡ʃʰ]	čh	U+0686 and U+06BE	Digraphs counted as letters.
څھےࣿ tshe	څھ	ـڅھ	ـڅھـ	څھـ	[t͡sʰ]	tsh	U+0685 and U+06BE	A digraph, counted as a letter. In the official Shina orthography in Indian-Controlled Kashmir, the letter ژھ is used.
ڇھےࣿ c̣he	ڇھ	ـڇھ	ـڇھـ	ڇھـ	[ʈ͡ʂʰ]	c̣h	U+0687 and U+06BE	A digraph, counted as a letter. In the official Shina orthography in Indian-Controlled Kashmir, the letter چْھ is used.
کھےࣿ khe	کھ	ـکھ	ـکھـ	کھـ	[kʰ]	kh	U+0643 and U+06BE	Digraphs counted as letters.
گھےࣿ ghe	گھ	ـگھ	ـگھـ	گھـ	[ɡʱ]	gh	U+06AF and U+06BE	Digraphs counted as letters.

=== Vowels ===
There are five vowels in Shina language. Each of the five vowels in Shina have a short version and a long version. Shina is also a tonal language. Short vowels in Shina have a short high level tone ˥. Long vowels can either have "no tone", i.e. a long flat tone ˧, a long rising tone [˨˦], or a long falling tone (/˥˩/.

All five vowels have a defined way of presentation in Shina orthographic conventions, including letters and diacritics. Although diacritics can and are occasionally dropped in writing. Short vowels [a], [i], and [u] are solely written with diacritics. Short vowels [e] and [o] are written with letters waw and buṛi ye. A unique diacritic, a small sideway noon ◌ࣿ (U+08FF) is used on top of these letters to indicate a short vowel. Long vowels are written with a combination of diacritics and letters alif, waaw or ye.

Below table shows short vowels at the beginning, middle, and end of a word.

Vowel at the beginning of the word
a	e	i	o	u
اَ	ایࣿـ / اےࣿ	اِ	اوࣿ	اُ
Vowel at the middle of the word
ـَ	یࣿـ / ـیࣿـ	ـِ	وࣿ / ـوࣿ	ـُ
Vowel at the end of the word
◌َہ / ـَہ	ےࣿ / ـےࣿ	◌ِہ / ـِہ	وࣿ / ـوࣿ	◌ُہ / ـُہ

Below table shows long vowels at the beginning, middle, and end of a word, with "no tone", i.e. a long flat tone ˧.

Vowel at the beginning of the word
aa	ee	ii	oo	uu
آ	ایـ / اے	اِیـ / اِی	او	اُو
Vowel at the middle of the word
ا / ـا	یـ / ـیـ	◌ِیـ / ـِیـ	و / ـو	◌ُو / ـُو
Vowel at the end of the word
ا / ـا	ے / ـے	◌ِی / ـِی	و / ـو	◌ُو / ـُو

Below table shows long vowels at the beginning, middle, and end of a word, with a long rising tone [˨˦].

Vowel at the beginning of the word
aá	eé	ií	oó	uú
آٗ	ایٗـ / اےٗ	اِیٗـ / اِیٗ	اوٗ	اُوٗ
Vowel at the middle of the word
اٗ / ـاٗ	یٗـ / ـیٗـ	◌ِیٗـ / ـِیٗـ	وٗ / ـوٗ	◌ُوٗ / ـُوٗ
Vowel at the end of the word
اٗ / ـاٗ	ےٗ / ـےٗ	◌ِیٗ / ـِی	وٗ / ـوٗ	◌ُوٗ / ـُوٗ

Below table shows long vowels at the beginning, middle, and end of a word, with a long falling tone (/˥˩/.

Vowel at the beginning of the word
áa	ée	íi	óo	úu
آٰ	ایٰـ / اےٰ	اِیٰـ / اِیٰ	اوٰ	اُوٰ
Vowel at the middle of the word
اٰ / ـاٰ	یٰـ / ـیٰـ	◌ِیٰـ / ـِیٰـ	وٰ / ـوٰ	◌ُوٰ / ـُوٰ
Vowel at the end of the word
اٰ / ـاٰ	ےٰ / ـےٰ	◌ِیٰ / ـِیٰ	وٰ / ـوٰ	◌ُوٰ / ـُوٰ

=== Text sample ===
Below is a short passage of sample phrases.

Shina Arabic alphabet (orthography of Gilgit-Baltistan and Kohistan)	اَساٰ ایࣿک سَنِیٰلو گوٰݜ پَشیٰس. اَساٰ دَہِیٰلو گوٰݜ پَشیٰس. گوٰݜ جیٰجِہ دَہِیٰلوࣿ لیٰل بِیٰنوࣿ. گوٰݜ وَزِیٗ نَہ دِتوباٰلو.
Latin Transliteration	Asáa ek saníilo góoṣ pašées. Asáa dahíilo góoṣ pašées. Góoṣ jéeji dahíilo léel bíino. Góoṣ wazií na ditobáalo.
Translation	We saw a completely constructed house. We saw the house burnt down. The house appears burnt by someone. The house could not collapse completely.

== See also ==
- Brokskat language
- Kundal Shahi language
- Ushoji language
- Kalkoti language
- Palula language
- Savi language

== Bibliography ==
- Bashir, Elena L. (2003). "Dardic". In George Cardona; Dhanesh Jain (eds.). The Indo-Aryan languages. Routledge language family series. Y. London: Routledge. pp. 818–94. ISBN 978-0-7007-1130-7.
- Bashir, Elena L. (2016). "Perso-Arabic adaptions for South Asian languages". In Hock, Hans Henrich; Bashir, Elena (eds.). The languages and linguistics of South Asia: a comprehensive guide. World of Linguistics. Berlin: De Gruyter Mouton. pp. 803–9. ISBN 978-3-11-042715-8.
- Rajapurohit, B. B. (1975). "The problems involved in the preparation of language teaching material in a spoken language with special reference to Shina". Teaching of Indian languages: seminar papers. University publication / Department of Linguistics, University of Kerala. V. I. Subramoniam, Nunnagoppula Sivarama Murty (eds.). Trivandrum: Dept. of Linguistics, University of Kerala.
- Rajapurohit, B. B. (1983). Shina phonetic reader. CIIL Phonetic Reader Series. Mysore: Central Institute of Indian Languages.
- Rajapurohit, B. B. (2012). Grammar of Shina Language and Vocabulary : (Based on the dialect spoken around Dras) (PDF).
- Schmidt, Ruth Laila (2003–2004). "The oral history of the Daṛmá lineage of Indus Kohistan" (PDF). European Bulletin of Himalayan Research (25/26): 61–79. ISSN 0943-8254.
- Schmidt, Ruth Laila; Kohistani, Razwal (2008). A grammar of the Shina language of Indus Kohistan. Beiträge zur Kenntnis südasiatischer Sprachen und Literaturen. Wiesbaden: Harrassowitz. ISBN 978-3-447-05676-2.
