= Sawi language (Dardic) =

Indo-Aryan language of Afghanistan and Pakistan

Sawi
- Savi, Sauji
- ساوي
- Native to: Afghanistan, Pakistan
- Native speakers: 9,000 (2021)
- Language family: Indo-European: Indo-Iranian; Indo-Aryan; Eastern Dardic; Shinaic; Sawi–Kalkoti–Palula?; Sawi

Language codes
- ISO 639-3: sdg
- Glottolog: savi1242
- ELP: Savi
- Sawi is classified as Definitely Endangered by the UNESCO Atlas of the World's Languages in Danger

Sawi, Savi, or Sauji, is an endangered Indo-Aryan language spoken in northeastern Afghanistan and north-western Pakistan. It is classified as a member of the Shina language cluster within the Dardic subgroup.

It is spoken in the village of Sau, on the east bank of the Kunar River, around 20 kilometres (12 mi) south of the town of Arandu, which is on the border with Pakistan's Chitral region. Sawi speakers consider themselves part of the Gawar ethnic group, which is found in half a dozen of the surrounding villages and whose language is Gawarbati. In communicating with them, the people of Sau reportedly resort to using Pashto. During the long period of unrest, the population of the village was displaced into refugee camps in Chitral and Dir, but reportedly many people have now returned to Afghanistan.

== History ==
The closest relative of the Sawi language is the southern variety of Palula spoken in Ashret further up the Kunar Valley in Chitral. Many Sawi speakers are aware of the similarity between the two languages, and some consider the people of Ashret as their "brothers". Henrik Liljegren's study of the shared linguistic features and the local oral traditions suggest that the ancestors of these language communities are likely to have migrated from the present-day Diamer District on the Indus River. There was probably an early split between Northern and Southern Palula, with Sawi subsequently branching off from the latter. The current similarity between the two varieties of Palula is then explained as a result of convergence.

== Grammar ==
The presence of weak voiced aspirates (bh, dh, gh) was cautiously reported by Buddruss in 1967, but Liljegren (2009, p. 31) found them to be absent from the speech of his consultant(s). It is likely that the loss of aspiration in the ancestor language could have been related to the development of a tone system.

Possibly under the influence of Gawarbati, Sawi has developed a voiceless lateral fricative ɬ out of the *tr consonant clusters of the earlier language, compare for example Sawi ɬo with Southern Palula tróo 'three'.

Unlike the main Shina varieties, where the past and present tense are typically marked for person, Sawi and Palula verb tenses are almost entirely participle-based, with only traces of agreement for person. Like Torwali, Sawi has grammaticalised the category of animacy in its nominal morphology (in contrast to Kalasha, Khowar, Shumashti and Pashai, where animacy has instead been grammaticalised in the verbal morphology). The agent suffix is -e for perfective transitive verbs. Unlike the main Shina varieties, Sawi does not seem to possess an agent suffix for imperfective transitive verbs.

== Bibliography ==
- Bashir, Elena L. (2016a). "Contact and convergence. The Northwest". In Hock, Hans Henrich; Bashir, Elena L. (eds.). The languages and linguistics of South Asia: a comprehensive guide. World of Linguistics. Berlin: De Gruyter Mouton. pp. 264–300. ISBN 978-3-11-042715-8.
- Bashir, Elena L. (2016b). "Language endangerment and documentation. Pakistan and Afghanistan". In Hock, Hans Henrich; Bashir, Elena L. (eds.). The languages and linguistics of South Asia: a comprehensive guide. World of Linguistics. Berlin: De Gruyter Mouton. pp. 638–45. ISBN 978-3-11-042715-8.
- Buddruss, George (1967). Die Sprache von sau in Ostafghanistan. Beiträge zur Kenntnis des Dardischen Phalura. Münchener Studien zur Sprachwissenschaft. Munich: J. Kitzinger.
- Cacopardo, Alberto M.; Cacopardo, Augusto S. (2001). Gates of Peristan: history, religion and society in the Hindu Kush. Reports and memoirs. Rome: IsIAO.
- Liljegren, Henrik (2009). "The Dangari Tongue of Choke and Machoke: Tracing the proto-language of Shina enclaves in the Hindu Kush". Acta Orientalia (70): 7–62.
- Liljegren, Henrik (2013). "Notes on Kalkoti: A Shina Language with Strong Kohistani Influence". Linguistic Discovery. 11 (1): 129–160. doi:10.1349/PS1.1537-0852.A.423. ISSN 1537-0852.
- Schmidt, Ruth Laila; Kaul, Vijay Kumar (2008). "A comparative analysis of Shina and Kashmiri vocabularies". Acta Orientalia. 69: 231–303. doi:10.5617/ao.7372.
