= Henrik Liljegren (linguist) =

Swedish linguist

Henrik Liljegren (Swedish pronunciation: [ˈhɛ̌nrɪk ˈlɪ̂ljɛˌgreːn]) is a linguist and Professor in the Department of Linguistics at Stockholm University. He does fieldwork on languages of northern Pakistan, particularly the Hindukush–Karakoram region, and studies typology of and genetic relations between languages of the region. His most recent project is investigating Language contact and relatedness in the Hindukush region, funded by the Swedish Research Council.

Liljegren earned his Ph.D. for his thesis Towards a grammatical description of Palula: An Indo-Aryan language of the Hindu Kush in 2008, advised by Östen Dahl at the University of Stockholm. He has published a grammar of Palula (based on his dissertation), and worked on other languages of the Hindukush, including Khowar, Kalasha, Shina, and Kalkoti, among others.

Anton I. Kogan, a linguist of Kashmiri and Dardic languages, in his review on Liljegren's grammar of Palula, stated: "Thanks to the author’s painstaking work, Palula can now be considered one of the best studied Dardic languages. It would not be an exaggeration to say that there is hardly any significant aspect of Palula phonology, morphology or syntax left unnoticed in the grammar under review."
