= Sīn with four dots above =

ݜ (Unicode name: Arabic Letter Seen With Four Dots Above) is an additional letter of the Arabic script, derived from sīn (ﺱ) with the addition of four dots or two horizontal lines above the letter. It is not used in the Arabic alphabet itself, but is used in Burushaski& Shina to represent voiceless retroflex fricative, [ʂ]. It is written as ݰ in Khowar.
