= Elena Bashir =

American linguist

Elena Bashir is an American linguist and senior lecturer in the Department of South Asian Languages and Civilizations of the Humanities Division of the University of Chicago. She studies languages of Pakistan and the broader northwestern part of South Asia, and has published extensive linguistic work on the Dardic languages, Hindko, Saraiki, Balochi, Brahui, Wakhi and Hindustani, among other languages of the region. Bashir also teaches Urdu.

Bashir received her Ph.D. in linguistics from the University of Michigan in Ann Arbor in 1988. Her dissertation was titled "Topics in Kalasha Syntax: An areal and typological perspective".

Bashir is on the board of trustees of the American Institute of Afghanistan Studies and has been on the advisory board of the Journal of Urdu Studies.

== Research ==
Much of the focus of Bashir's work has been on the Dardic languages. She wrote her thesis and a number of related articles on the Kalasha language. Her analyses of Kalasha grammar, based on texts and her own fieldwork, have included discussion of the typological and genetic relationships of Kalasha to Khowar and broader Indo-Aryan and Iranian languages.

Bashir and linguist Hans Henrich Hock were editors of the 2016 book The Languages and Linguistics of South Asia: A Comprehensive Guide, part of De Gruyter's The World of Linguistics series.

== Works ==
- — (1989). Topics in Kalasha Syntax: An Areal and Typological Perspective (Thesis). hdl:2027.42/161898.
- — (2003). "Dardic". In Georga Cardona; Dhanesh Jain (eds.). The Indo-Aryan Languages. Routledge.
- — (2006). "Evidentiality in South Asian languages" (PDF). Proceedings of the LFG06 Conference, Workshop on South Asian Languages.
- — (2009). "Wakhi". In Gernot Windfuhr (ed.). The Iranian Languages. Routledge.
- — (2010). "Traces of mirativity in Shina" (PDF). Himalayan Linguistics. 9 (2).
- —; Conners, Thomas J. (2019). A Descriptive Grammar of Hindko, Panjabi, and Saraiki. De Gruyter. ISBN 978-1-61451-296-7.
