= Ushoji language =

Indo-Aryan language spoken in Pakistan

Ushoji
- اُݜوجو
- Pronunciation: [ʊˈʂoːd͡ʒoː]
- Native to: Pakistan
- Region: Swat, Kohistan
- Native speakers: (2,000 cited 1992)
- Language family: Indo-European: Indo-Iranian; Indo-Aryan; Eastern Dardic; Shinaic; Kohistani–Ushoji Shina; Ushoji

Language codes
- ISO 639-3: ush
- Glottolog: usho1238
- ELP: Ushojo

Ushoji or Ushojo (اُݜوجو, Uṣōǰō; pronounced [ʊˈʂoːd͡ʒoː]) is an Indo-Aryan language spoken in Kohistan and Swat districts of the Khyber-Pakhtunkhwa province of Pakistan.

== Status ==
Ushoji may be severely endangered due to the dominance of the Pashto language in the region, especially in Swat.

== Numerals ==
	English gloss	Ushoji
1	one	ɪk (اِیۡک)
2	two	du (دُو)
3	three	t͡ʃe (ۡچِے)
4	four	t͡ʃar (چَر)
5	five	pʰʊʃ (پھُش)
6	six	ʃɑ (شَا)
7	seven	sɑʈ (سَاٹ)
8	eight	ɑʈ (آٹ)
9	nine	nəo (نِیُو)
10	ten	de (ۡدِے)
20	twenty	bɪey (ۡبِئے)
100	hundred	sao (سَئو)
1000	thousand	zʌr (زَرۡ)

== Orthography ==
Ushojo is written in a variety of the Torwali and Shina alphabets in the Perso-Arabic script in the Nastaliq style.

Letter	Romanization	IPA
آ	ā	/aː/
أ	a	/a/
ا	ʿ	/ʔ/
ب	b	/b/
پ	p	/p/
ت	t	/t/
ٹ	ṭ	/ʈ/
ث	(s)	/s/
ج	ǰ	/d͡ʒ/
چ	č	/t͡ʃ/
ڇ	ċ	/ʈ͡ʂ/
څ	c	/t͡s/
ح	(h)	/h/
خ	ǩ	/x/
د	d	/d/
ڈ	ḍ	/ɖ/
ذ	(z)	/z/
ر	r	/r/
ڑ	ṛ	/ɽ/
ز	z	/z/
ڙ	ż	/ʐ/
ژ	ž	/ʒ/
س	s	/s/
ش	š	/ʃ/
ݜ	ṣ	/ʂ/
ص	(s)	/s/
ض	(d)	/d/
ط	(t)	/t/
ظ	(z)	/z/
ع	ʿ	/ʔ/
غ	ǧ	/ɣ/
ف	f	/f/
ق	(k)	/k/
ک	k	/k/
گ	g	/ɡ/
ل	l	/l/
م	m	/m/
ن	n	/n/
و	w	/ʊ~w/
ہ	h, x	/h/ɦ/
ھ	_h	/ʰ/ʱ/
ء	ʿ	/ʔ/
ی	y	/j/
ے	e	/e/
