= Hans Henrich Hock =

American linguist (born 1938)

- Born: 26 September 1938 (age 88); Germany

Academic background
- Education: Yale University
- Thesis: The so-called Aeolic inflection of the Greek contract verbs (1971)

Academic work
- Discipline: Linguistics
- Sub-discipline: Indo-European studies
- Notable works: Principles of Historical Linguistics (1991); Language History, Language Change, and Language Relationship (with Brian Joseph) (2009)

Hans Henrich Hock (born 26 September 1938) is a German-born American linguist and Professor Emeritus of Linguistics and Sanskrit at the University of Illinois Urbana-Champaign.

Hock holds graduate degrees from Northwestern and Yale universities. His research interests include general historical and comparative linguistics, as well as the linguistics of Sanskrit. He taught general historical linguistics, Indo-European linguistics, Sanskrit, diachronic sociolinguistics, pidgins and creoles, and the history of linguistics. He has served on the Undergraduate Program Committee of the Department of Linguistics since 1993.

== Publications ==
- Principles of historical linguistics. Berlin: Mouton de Gruyter, 1986. (Trends in Linguistics: Studies and Monographs, 34. Also as paperback.) (pp. xii, 722)
  - Principles of historical linguistics; second, corrected and augmented edition. Berlin: Mouton de Gruyter, 1991. (pp. xiii, 744)
- (ed.) Studies in Sanskrit syntax: A volume in honor of the centennial of Speijer's "Sanskrit Syntax". Delhi: Motilal Banarsidass, 1991.
- (ed. with Elmer Antonsen) Stæfcræft: Studies in Germanic Linguistics: Selected papers from the 1st and 2nd Symposium on Germanic Linguistics, University of Chicago, 4 April 1985, and University of Illinois at Urbana-Champaign, 3–4 Oct. 1986. Amsterdam: John Benjamins, 1991. (Current Issues in Linguistic Theory 79.) (pp. viii, 217).
- (with Brian Joseph) Language history, language change, and language relationship: An introduction to historical and comparative linguistics. Berlin: Mouton de Gruyter, 1996. (Trends in Linguistics, 93. Also as paperback.) (pp. xv, 602).
  - (with Brian Joseph) Language history, language change, and language relationship: An introduction to historical and comparative linguistics. Berlin: Mouton de Gruyter, rev. 2nd ed, 2009.
- An early Upanisadic reader, with notes, glossary, and an appendix of related Vedic texts. Delhi: Motilal Banarsidass, 2007.
