= Palula language =

Indo-Aryan language spoken in the Chitral District Pakistan

Palula
- پالُولا; Paaluulaá
- Palula in Nastaliq
- Pronunciation: /paːluːlǎː/
- Native to: Pakistan
- Region: Chitral
- Ethnicity: Palula
- Native speakers: 10,000 (2018); The population of Ashret and Biol Valleys is almost completely monolingual (2008)
- Language family: Indo-European: Indo-Iranian; Indo-Aryan; Eastern Dardic; Shinaic; Sawi–Kalkoti–Palula?; Kalkoti–Palula?; Palula
- Writing system: Palula alphabet (Nastaʿlīq script)

Language codes
- ISO 639-3: phl
- Glottolog: phal1254
- ELP: Phalura

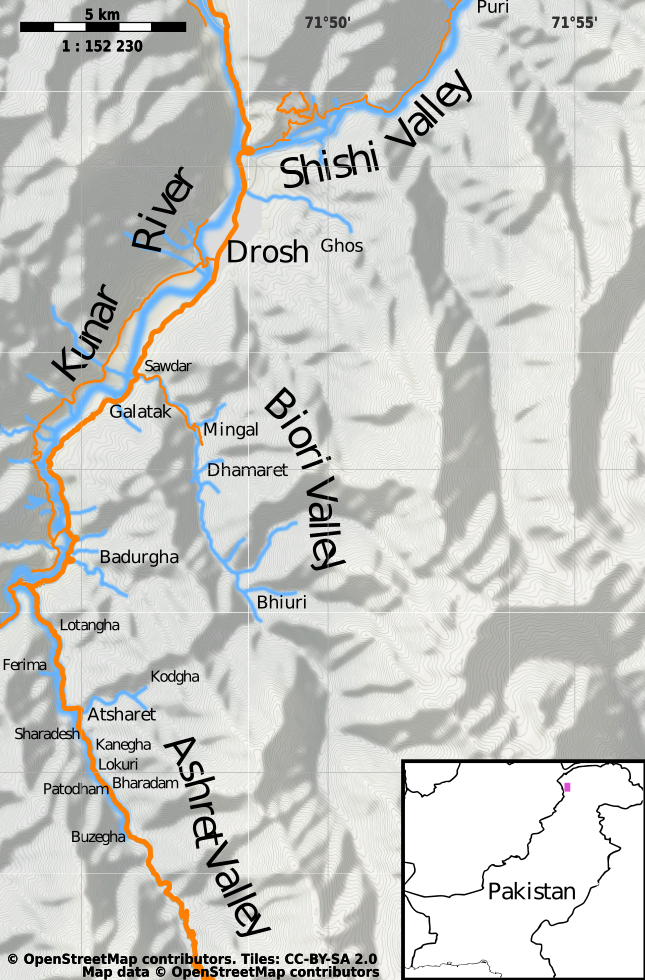
Map of the region in Pakistan where the Palula language is spoken

Palula (IPA: [paːluːlǎː], also spelt Phalura, Palola, Phalulo) and also known as Ashreti (Aćharêtâʹ) or Dangarikwar (the name used by Khowar speakers), is an Indo-Aryan language spoken by approximately 10,000 people in the valleys of Ashret and Biori, as well as in the village of Puri (also Purigal) in the Shishi valley and at least by a portion of the population in the village Kalkatak, in the Lower Chitral District of Khyber Pakhtunkhwa province of Pakistan.

In some of the smaller villages, Palula has either ceased to be spoken (in the village Ghos, situated near Drosh) or its speakers are largely shifting (as in Puri and Kalkatak) to the more widely spoken Khowar language. However, in the main Palula settlements in the Biori and Ashret valleys, it is a strong, vibrant and growing language, as the population in those areas increases and it is still with a few exceptions the mother tongue of almost all people.

Palula is pronounced as /paːluːlǎː/, with three long vowels and a rising pitch on the final syllable.

== Study and classification ==
The Palula language has been documented by George Morgenstierne (1926, 1941), Kendall Decker (1992), Richard Strand (1997-2023 [1998, 2000]), Henrik Liljegren (2008, 2009, 2010), and Henrik Liljegren & Naseem Haider (2009, 2011).

It is classified as a Dardic language, but this is more of a geographical classification than a linguistic one.

== Phonology ==
=== Vowels ===
Palula vowel chart, from Liljegren & Haider (2009:383)

The following table sets out the vowels of Palula.

	Front	Central	Back
Close	i iː		u uː
Mid	e eː		o oː
Open		a aː	

Nasalization is found; however, it is typically limited to vowels preceding sibilants and nasals and word finally.

=== Consonants ===
The consonant inventory of Palula is shown in the chart below.

		Labial	Denti- alveolar	Retroflex	Palatal	Velar	Uvular	Glottal
Nasal	voiced	m	n	ɳ				
Nasal	breathy voiced	mʱ	nʱ					
Plosive	voiceless	p	t	ʈ		k	(q)	
Plosive	voiced	b	d	ɖ		ɡ		
Plosive	aspirated	pʰ	tʰ	ʈʰ		kʰ		
Plosive	breathy voiced	bʱ	dʱ	ɖʱ		ɡʱ		
Affricate	plain		ts	tʂ	tɕ			
Affricate	aspirated		tsʰ	tʂʰ	tɕʰ			
Fricative	voiceless	(f)	s	ʂ	ɕ	x		h
Fricative	voiced		z	(ʐ)	ʑ	ɣ		
Fricative	breathy voiced		zʱ	(ʐʱ)	(ʑʱ)			
Approximant	voiced		l		j	w		
Approximant	breathy voiced		lʱ		jʱ	wʱ		
Tap/Flap	voiced		ɾ	ɽ				
Tap/Flap	breathy voiced		ɾʱ					

Notes

- The phonemes /ʐ, ʐʱ, ʑʱ/ have a limited distribution throughout the language.
- The aforementioned /ʐ/ phoneme appears to have an even more rare realization; ⟨ɖʐ⟩, which appears in the word ẓhaṇẓíir: [ɖʐʱaɳɖʐîːɾ], meaning chain. ⟨ɖʐ⟩ and ⟨ʐ⟩ are most likely allophones.
- The phonemes /q/ and /f/, which are only used in loanwords from foreign languages, are often realized as the native consonants ⟨x⟩ and ⟨pʰ⟩ respectively.
- The phonemic status of the voiceless aspirate and breathy voiced series are debatable. The breathy voiced series is generally considered lexical—a cluster of a consonant + /h/.
- Neither voiceless aspiration nor breathy voicing co-occur with the voiceless fricatives /(f) s ʂ ɕ x h/, the distributionally limited /ɳ ɽ/, along with the newly borrowed phonemes /ɣ (q)/ in a syllable onset.
- The phonemes /t/ and /d/ are realized as ⟨t̪⟩ and ⟨d̪⟩ respectively.
- Similarly to the ⟨ʐ⟩~⟨ɖʐ⟩ connection, the phoneme /ʑ/ is often realized with an affricate pronunciation, similar to ⟨dʑ⟩. This might be because /ʑ/ represents both ج and ژ.
- The phoneme /n/ has many different realizations depending on context. It is realized as a palatal nasal ⟨ɲ⟩ when /n/ precedes a palatal consonant. Similarly, /n/ is realized as a velar nasal ⟨ŋ⟩ when /n/ precedes a velar stop. When preceding a retroflex consonant, nasals assimilate and are thus realized as ⟨ɳ⟩. However, /ɳ/ appears to be a phoneme independent from /n/ as it distinguishes from it and can create minimal pairs such as "/kan/: shoulder" and "/kaɳ/: ear".
  In all other cases, /n/ is realized as its baseline pronunciation of ⟨n̪⟩, thus classifying /n/ as a dental nasal as opposed to an alveolar one.
- The phoneme /r/ is realized as a ⟨ɾ⟩, often being a tap instead of a trill.
- As with the case of Urdu, /ɽ/ cannot occur word-initially. However in Ashret, word-initially, /ɽ/ may be realized as a variation of /l/ (/lo/~/ɽo/: he, that).
- The lateral approximant /l/ is velarized ⟨ɫ⟩ if preceded by a back vowel (a, aa, o, oo, u, uu), otherwise, it's realized as ⟨l⟩. This means that the word "khéeli" is pronounced as "[kʰêːli]", but the word "khúulu" is pronounced as "[kʰûːɫu]".
- Depending on the speaker, the phoneme /w/ can be realized as either bilabially ⟨β̞⟩, or similar to a labiodental ⟨ʋ⟩, as is the case with Urdu.

=== Tone ===
Like many Dardic languages, Palula shows either tone or, as in Palula, a pitch accent. Words may have only one accented mora, which is associated with high pitch; the remaining mora have a default or low pitch.

== Writing system ==
In 2004, Anjuman-e-Taraqqi-e-Palula, the Society for the promotion of Palula, was founded by people in the Palula community to promote the continued use of their language and to encourage research and documentation of their language, history and culture. After the establishment of a written form of the language, the society is now engaged in producing literature and educational material in Palula. In 2006, Palula Alifbe (Palula alphabet book) and Palula Shiluka (Palula stories) were jointly published by the Anjuman-e-taraqqi-e-Palula and the Frontier Language Institute in Peshawar.

In 2008, a mother-tongue based educational programme was launched by a local school management committee in Ashret and a first batch of Palula children could start learning to read and write in their own language. Since 2010, two schools operate within this programme in Ashret, using a curriculum developed by the community itself with assistance from the Forum for Language Initiatives (a regional language resource centre based in Islamabad).

The writing system made by Anjuman-e-Taraqqi-e-Palula is as follows:

=== Letters ===
Letter	Transcription	IPA	Notes
ا	aa, -	/aː/,/∅/	Used as a vowel placeholder in initial form. Used to represent the "aa" vowel in medial and final positions.
ب	b	/b/	
پ	p	/p/	
ت	t	/t/	
ٹ	ṭ	/ʈ/	
ث	(s)	/s/	Only used in loanwords.
ج	ǰ	/ʑ/	
چ	č	/t͡ɕ/	
ڇ	c̣	/ʈ͡ʂ/	
څ	ts	/t͡s/	
ح	(h)	/h/	Only used in loanwords.
خ	x	/x/	
د	d	/d/	
ڈ	ḍ	/ɖ/	
ذ	(z)	/z/	Only used in loanwords.
ر	r	/r/	
ڑ	ṛ	/ɽ/	
ز	z	/z/	
ژ	(ǰ)	/ʑ/	Only used in loanwords.
ڙ	ẓ	/ʐ/	
س	s	/s/	
ش	š	/ɕ/	
ݜ	ṣ	/ʂ/	
ص	(s)	/s/	Only used in loanwords.
ض	(z)	/z/	Only used in loanwords.
ط	(t)	/t/	Only used in loanwords.
ظ	(z)	/z/	Only used in loanwords.
ع	-	/∅/	Only used in loanwords, no pronunciation.
غ	ɣ	/ɣ/	
ف	f	/f/	Only used in loanwords, may or may not have a unique pronunciation or a native pronunciation, depends on speaker.
ق	q	/q/	Only used in loanwords, may or may not have a unique pronunciation or a native pronunciation, depends on speaker.
ک	k	/k/	
گ	g	/g/	
ل	l	/l/	
م	m	/m/	
ن	n	/n/	
ݨ	ṇ	/ɳ/	Sometimes formed when "n" precedes a retroflex consonant.
ں	_~	/◌̃/	No pronunciation on its own. Nasalizes preceding vowel.
و	w, oo, uu, o	/w/,/oː/,/uː/,/o/	Can be read as a consonant or a vowel depending on context. See more in Vowel orthography section.
ہ	h	/h/	
ھ	_h	/◌ʰ//,//◌ʱ/	No pronunciation on its own. Marks aspiration on the preceding consonant.
ی	y, ii, i	/j/,/iː/,/i/	Can be read as a consonant or a vowel depending on context. See more in Vowels section.
ے	ee, e	/eː/,/e/	See more in Vowel orthography section.

=== Vowels ===
The use of diacritics seems to fluctuate depending on the writer, however, it is almost always used when needing to distinguish from another word with similar vowels, but can be dropped otherwise.

Vowel	Forms			IPA	Notes
Vowel	Final	Medial	Initial	IPA	Notes
a	ـَ		اَ	/a/	
aa	ـَا		آ	/aː/	
e	ـےۡ	N/A		/e/	In Ashret, word initial and medial /e/ fluctuates with /a/.
ee	ـے	ـیـ	ایـ	/eː/	
i	ـیۡ	ـِ	اِ	/i/	
ii	ـِی	ـِیـ	اِیـ	/iː/	
o	ـوۡ	ـو	او	/o/	In Ashret, word initial and medial /o/ fluctuates between /u/.
oo	ـو		او	/oː/	
u	ـُ		اُ	/u/	
uu	ـُو		اُو	/uː/	

== Bibliography ==
- Baart, Joan L. G. (2003), Tonal features in languages of northern Pakistan (PDF), National Institute of Pakistan Studies, Quaid-i-Azam University and Summer Institute of Linguistics, pp. 3, 6
- Decker, Kendall D. (1992). Languages of Chitral. National Institute of Pakistan Studies, Quaid-i-Azam University. ISBN 969-8023-15-1.
- Edelman, D. I. (1983), The Dardic and Nuristani Languages, Moscow: Institut vostokovedeniia (Akademiia nauk SSSR)
- Haider, Naseem. 2012. Palula matali. [Palula proverbs]. (Maqami Zaban-o-Adab kaa Ishaati Silsila 1.) Islamabad: Forum of Language Initiatives
- Liljegren, Henrik (2008). Towards a grammatical description of Palula: An Indo-Aryan language of the Hindu Kush (PhD dissertation thesis). Stockholm: Stockholm University. ISBN 978-91-7155-599-1. urn:nbn:se:su:diva-7511.
- Liljegren, Henrik (2009). "The Dangari Tongue of Choke and Machoke: Tracing the proto-language of Shina enclaves in the Hindu Kush". Acta Orientalia. 70: 7–62.
- Liljegren, Henrik (2010). "Where have all the verbs gone? On verb stretching and semi-words in Indo-Aryan Palula" (PDF). Himalayan Linguistics. 9 (1): 51–79. doi:10.5070/H99123044. Archived from the original (PDF) on 2012-03-15.
- Liljegren, Henrik; Haider, Naseem (2009), "Palula", Journal of the International Phonetic Association, 39 (3): 381–386, doi:10.1017/S0025100309990193
- Liljegren, Henrik; Haider, Naseem (2011). Palula Vocabulary. FLI Language and Culture Series, No. 7. Islamabad: Forum for Language Initiatives. ISBN 978-969-9437-07-6. urn:nbn:se:su:diva-65210.
- Liljegren, Henrik (2016). A Grammar of Palula. Studies in Diversity Linguistics 8. Berlin: Language Science Press. doi:10.17169/langsci.b82.85. ISBN 978-3-946234-31-9.
- Morgenstierne, Georg (1926). Report on a Linguistic Mission to Afghanistan. Instituttet for Sammenlignende Kulturforskning, Serie C I-2. Oslo. ISBN 0-923891-09-9
- Morgenstierne, Georg (1941). Notes on Phalura: An unknown Dardic language of Chitral (PDF). Oslo: J. Dybwad.
- Strand, Richard F. (1997-2023). Nuristân, Hidden Land of the Hindu-Kush. https://nuristan.info.
- Strand, Richard F. (2001). The tongues of Peristân. Appendix 1, pp 251–257 in Gates of Peristan: History, Religion and Society in the Hindu Kush, Reports and memoirs, edited by Alberto M Cacopardo and Augusto S Cacopardo. Rome: IsIAO.
- Strand, Richard F. (2022). "Phonatory Location in the Far North-Western Indo-Âryan Languages". In Baart, Joan L.G.; Liljegren, Henrik; Payne, Thomas E. (eds.). Languages of Northern Pakistan: Essays in Memory of Carla Radloff. Karachi: Oxford University Press. pp. 446–495.
- The Languages Of Pakistan, Badshah Munir Bukhari. London
