= Kalkoti language =

Indo-Aryan language of Pakistan

Kalkoti
- Pronunciation: [kʰælkoːʈ]
- Native to: Pakistan
- Region: Kalkot Tehsil
- Native speakers: 6,000 (2018)
- Language family: Indo-European: Indo-Iranian; Indo-Aryan; Eastern Dardic; Shinaic; Sawi–Kalkoti–Palula?; Kalkoti–Palula?; Kalkoti

Language codes
- ISO 639-3: xka
- Glottolog: kalk1245

Kalkoti, also known as Goedijaa, is an Indo-Aryan language spoken in the Kalkot Tehsil, in the Upper Dir district in Pakistan.

== Phonology ==
The following tables outline the phonology of Kalkoti.

=== Vowels ===
	Front	Back
Close	ɪ~i(ː)	ʊ~u(ː)
Mid	eː	oː
Open	ə~æ(ː)~aː	ɑ(ː)~ɒ(ː)

Short vowels are slightly centralized; nasalization of vowels may be phonemic.

=== Consonants ===
		Labial	Dental	Retroflex	Palatal	Velar	Uvular	Glottal
Nasal		m	n	ɳ (?)		ŋ (?)		
Plosive	voiceless	p	t	ʈ		k	q	ʔ (?)
Plosive	aspirated	pʰ	tʰ	ʈʰ (?)		kʰ		
Plosive	voiced	b	d	ɖ		ɡ		
Affricate	voiceless		ts	tʂ	tʃ			
Affricate	aspirated			tʂʰ (?)	tʃʰ			
Affricate	voiced				dʒ			
Fricative	voiceless	(f)	s	ʂ	ʃ	x		
Fricative	voiced		z			ɣ		
Lateral			l					
Flap			ɾ	ɽ (?)				
Approximant		ʋ			j			

The phonemes /q, ʦ, x, z, ɣ, ɽ/ have likely been introduced by loanwords. The voiceless aspirate series is secure, and, unlike the neighboring Palula language, Kalkoti does not have a breathy voiced series. The phonemic status of /ʔ/ is unclear and is likely tied to tone in Kalkoti.

=== Tone ===
Kalkoti's system of tone likely was similar to Shina's two tone system; however, under pressure from its Kohistani neighbors it may now have a more complex tone inventory.

== Bibliography ==
- Liljegren, Henrik (2013). "Notes on Kalkoti: A Shina Language with Strong Kohistani Influence". Linguistic Discovery. 11 (1): 129–160. doi:10.1349/PS1.1537-0852.A.423. ISSN 1537-0852.
