= Pauri Bareli language =

Indo-Aryan language spoken in India

Pauri
- Bareli
- Ethnicity: Bhil
- Native speakers: 991,257 (2011 census)
- Language family: Indo-European: Indo-Iranian; Indo-Aryan; Western Indo-Aryan; Bhil; Bareli; Pauri

Language codes
- ISO 639-3: bfb
- Glottolog: paur1238

Pauri Bareli is a Bhil language of India. It is close to two other languages called Bareli, Rathwi (not Rathwi Bhilali) and Palya, as well as to Kalto, but is not mutually intelligible with them.
