= Nahali =

Nahali may refer to the following languages of central India:

- Nihali language, or Nahali, a language isolate
- Kalto language, or Nahali, an Indo-Aryan language

== See also ==
- Nahari language, an Indo-Aryan language of Chhattisgarh and Odisha
