= Bhunjia =

Scheduled tribe in Odisha, India

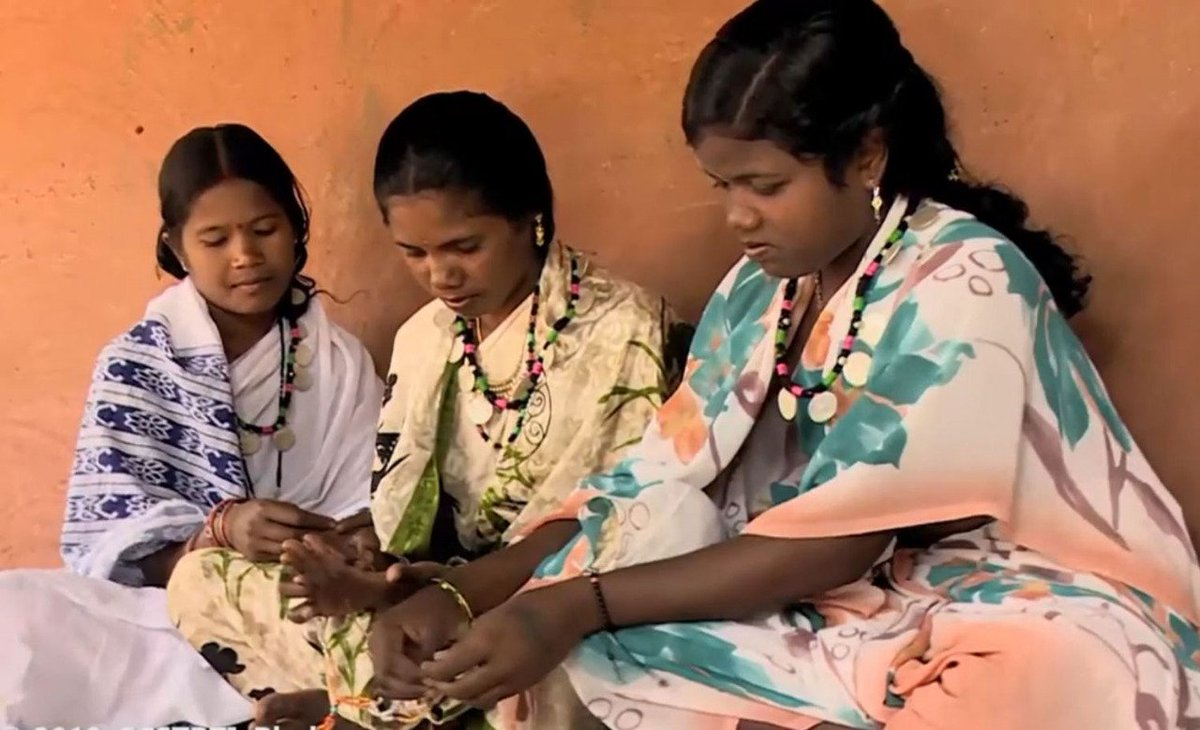

Total population
- 22,953 (2011)

Regions with significant populations
- Odisha: 12,350
- Chhattisgarh: 10,603

Languages
- Bhunjia, Chhattisgarhi, Odia

Religion
- Autonomous Tribal Religion

Bhunjias are an ethnic group found in India mainly who reside in Sunabeda plateau in Odisha and Chhattisgarh. They are mostly found in Nuapada district, which is roughly between 22° 55′ N and 21° 30′ N latitude and 82° 35′ E longitude. It was a part of Khariar Zamindari, which formed the eastern and the southeastern region of Raipur district of Chhattisgarh division in Central Province till 1 April 1936, when it was transferred to Odisha on its creation. It is now in Komna block of Nuapada district in Orissa. In Chhattisgarh they are found in Raipur district.

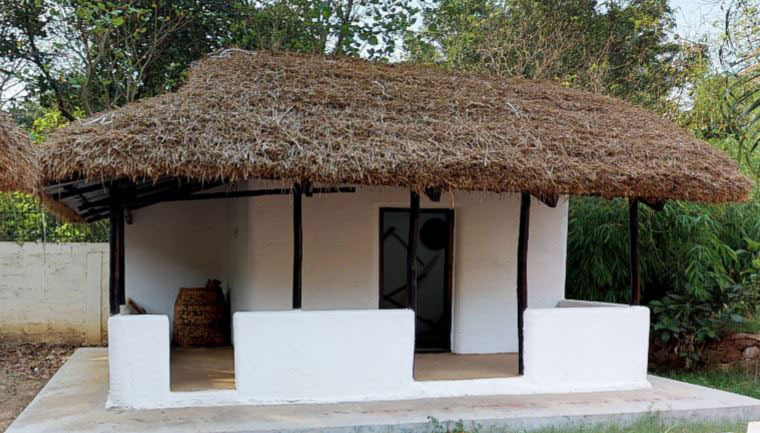
A Chukutia Bhunjia hut

== Culture ==
Bhunjias are divided into two main sections i.e. Chinda Bhunjia and Chaukhutia Bhunjia. The Chaukhutia Bhunjia are confined exclusively to the hills of the Sunabeda plateau in ecologically secluded areas for which they maintain distance from the outsiders. But the Chinda Bhunjia generally lives in the plains and have close contact with the tribal and non-tribal communities. The religious life of Bhunjia is very simple. They believe in many Gods and Goddesses who are worshipped in different months on different ritual occasions.

Their major festivals are Dussehra, Chaval Dhona, Naya Khana. They practice monogamous marriage. Most prevalent methods of marriage are by exchange and elopement among others. They also practice levirate and sororate types of marriage. Bride price practice is not prevalent among them.

== Bhunjia Oral Tradition ==
The rich folklore of Bhunjia community has been documented by Dr Mahendra Kumar Mishra in his seminal book Oral Epics of Kalahandi (2007). The songs and tales, the myth of Goddess Sunadi, origin of paddy from Sunabeda, Bhujia myth of Origin are narrated in his book. Besides Surendra Kumar Mishra from Sinapali has written a book on Bhunjia Sanskruti which has been published by the academy of tribal language and culture, Bhubaneswar. The most important is their epic songs of Allah Udal, Tulsi beer, Mandhar MAjhi and life of Goddess Sunadi are some of the important narratives the Bhunjia singers, priests and Gurumai sing.

== Language ==
Bhunjia speakers belong to the Indo-Aryan language family as they speak Bhunjia, part of the Halbic languages, which is considered a mixture of Odia, Marathi and Chhattisgarhi. However, S.C. Dubey, analyzing the myth and oral tradition of Chhattisgarh, considers the Bhunjia as a branch of Halbas of Baster, who fled from Baster due to their quarrel with Dhakars.
