= Narikurava =

Indigenous group from Tamil Nadu, South India

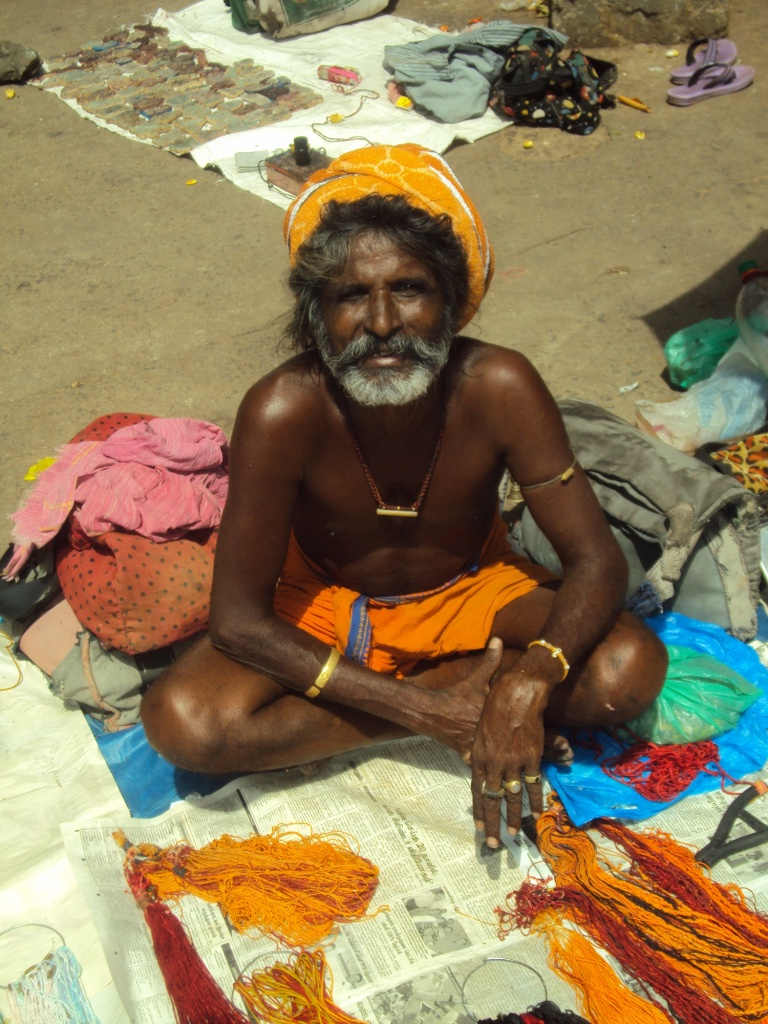

Regions with significant populations
- Tamil Nadu

Languages
- Vagriboli, Tamil

Religion
- Animism

Related ethnic groups
- Indo Aryan people

The Narikkuṟava are an indigenous group from the Indian state of Tamil Nadu.

During British rule in India they were placed under the Criminal Tribes Act of 1871. Hence they were stigmatized for a long time, including after Independence. They were denotified in 1952. The stigma continues.

== Origins ==
A theory propounded in 1966 by Werth and Fraser, authorities on the "Gypsies" of Europe, they believe that the Domar are the ancestors of the Romani people and, therefore, the Narikuravas are related to the Romani.

== Language ==
The Narikuravas speak the unclassified Indo-Aryan language called Vaagri Booli.

Due to this reason, they are also known as Vagris or Vagrivalas.

== Sub-divisions ==
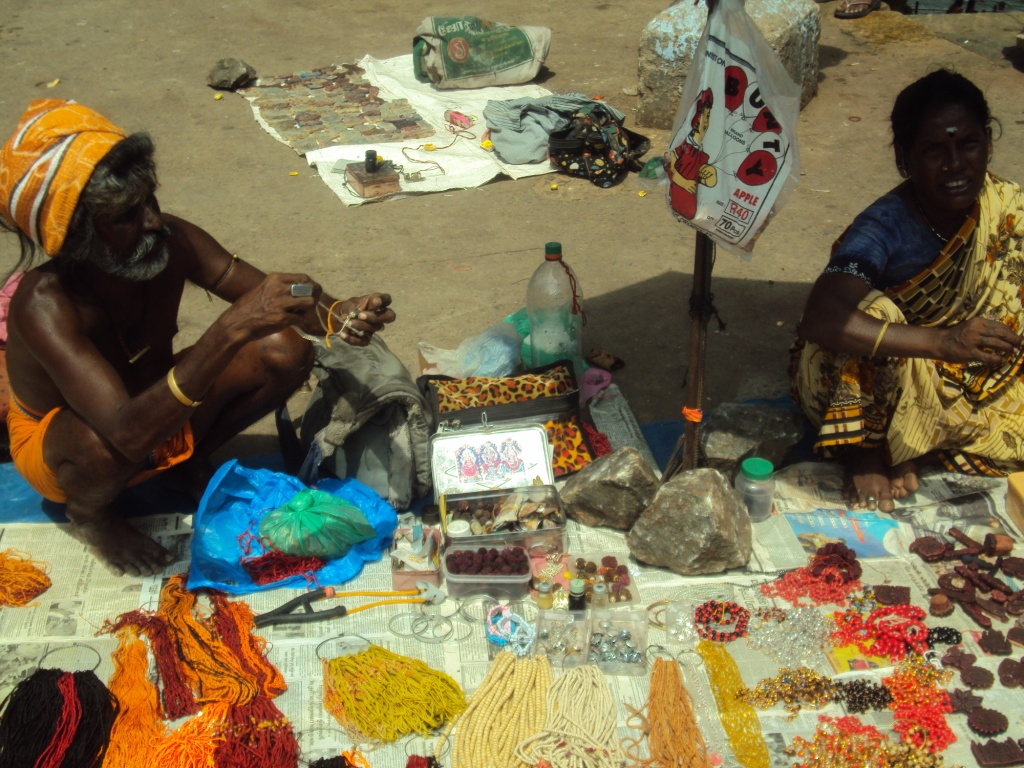
A Narikorava shop selling beads

Although all vagirivala or kuruvikarar come under one roof based on their common clan name nari-kuravars they were broadly sub-divided into two sub-divisions: the buffalo-sacrificers and Nandevala or goat-sacrificers. But they are commonly classified based on the region they originate from. The Seliyos have only one sub-sect, the Vithiyo.

== Customs and practices ==
Each Narikurava clan has a bundle of clothes called sami-mootai meaning "God's bundle". It is filled with blood of animals sacrificed by the Narikuravas and clothes dipped in them. The sami-mootai of one clan must not be touched by members of another clan. On the death of the head of the family, his eldest son inherits the sami-mootai. The prestige a clan-leader holds, depends on the antiquity of his sami-mootai.

== Silambam ==
Silambam is a stick fighting style that supposedly originated from the Kurinji hills some 5000 years ago, where the native kuravar used bamboo staves called Silambam to defend themselves against wild animals.

== Issues ==
The major issues which confront Narikuravas are poverty, illiteracy, diseases and discrimination.

There has been discrimination of Narikuravas since ancient times. Due to their consumption of the Golden Jackal, which is forbidden by settled Hindu communities and other habits, they are not to be touched and are excluded from streets inhabited by other Hindu castes. This has led to protests and resentment from the community. The Narikuravas have been recognized as scheduled tribes in 2023 by the central government of India.

High crime rates and unemployment are other problems which afflict the Narikurava community. The proscription of fox-hunting as well as killing endangered species of birds and wildlife have depleted the Narikuravas of their traditional sources of livelihood. As a result, unemployed Narikurava youth are taking to crime and illegal activities. There have also been instances when Narikurava have been arrested for the possession of unregistered firearms as country rifles which are banned according to the Indian laws.

On 1996, a social-welfare organization named Narikurava Seva Sangam was formed in order to educate Narikurava children and facilitate them to lead a settled life. Other social-welfare organizations have poured in their efforts to improve the lives of the Narikuravas. In May 2008, the creation of a Welfare Board for the Narikuravas headed by the Backward Classes Minister was authorized by the State Government. Steady progress is being made in educating Narikuravas and assimilating them into society. The demand to remove them from the Backward Class list and include them into Scheduled Tribes was accepted by the government of Tamil Nadu.

== See also ==
- Doma (caste)
- Origins of the Romani people
