= Hakkipikki =

Total population
- 11,892

Regions with significant populations
- India
- Karnataka: 11,892

Languages
- Vaagri Booli

Religion
- Hinduism

The Hakkipikki is a major (ST) tribal community currently found mostly in Karnataka, India, in the Shimoga, Davanagere and Mysore districts. They are also known as Haranashikari, Pashi Pardhi, Adavichencher, Shikari and Gond in other northern india states. In Kannada, the word "Hakki" means "bird," and "Pikki" refers to the verb "to catch." Thus, the community is traditionally known as the "bird catchers," reflecting their traditional occupation. The community speaks an Indo-Aryan language called 'Vaagri' or 'Vaagribooli', which is similar to the Gujarati language.

== History ==
Research studies have found that they are kshatriyas, or warrior communities who share an ancestral relationship with the legendary Rana Pratap, King of Mewar. After the death of Rana Pratap, the community dispersed throughout India. The Hakkipikki community migrated from Northern India and are native to Gujarat and Rajasthan, having migrated south through Andhra Pradesh before settling in Karnataka long ago.

== Social structure ==
The Hakkipikki follow a matriarchal social structure and practice endogamy and monogamy. During marriages, the cost of weddings is borne by the groom and his family, and they also have to pay dowry to the bride's people.

== Livelihood ==
Traditionally, the Hakkipikki drew their livelihood from bird catching. However, after the Wildlife Protection Act of 1972 which criminalized bird catching and hunting, they have moved to alternative income sources including agricultural labor, small trade and collection of medicinal plants and preparing traditional herbal remedies for sale in urban markets. Recently, with bollywood celebrities and influencers promoting their herbal products, many Hakkipikki community members have emerged as successful entrepreneurs in the hair oil industry.
