= Bpx =

Bpx may refer to:

- Qamdo Bamda Airport, China (by IATA code)
- Palya Bareli language (by ISO 639 code)
