= Lahul Lohar language =

Indo-Aryan language of India

Lahul Lohar
- Native to: India
- Region: Himachal Pradesh
- Native speakers: (750 cited 1996)
- Language family: Indo-European: Indo-Iranian; Indo-Aryan; (unclassified); Chinali–Lahul; Lahul Lohar

Language codes
- ISO 639-3: lhl
- Glottolog: lahu1250

Lahul Lohar (also known as Lohari) is an unclassified Indo-Aryan language of northern India. It is spoken by about 750 people in the Lahul region of Himachal Pradesh and in the adjoining Leh district of Ladakh. It is distinct from Gade Lohar, though culturally similar.

== Phonology ==
Consonants
		Labial	Dental	Palatal	Retroflex	Velar/ Glottal
Nasal		m	n			ŋ
Stop	voiceless	p	t̪		ʈ	k
Stop	aspirated	pʰ	t̪ʰ		ʈʰ	kʰ
Stop	voiced	b	d̪		ɖ	ɡ
Stop	breathy	bʱ	d̪ʱ		ɖʱ	ɡʱ
Affricate	voiceless		t͡s	t͡ʃ		
Affricate	aspirated		t͡sʰ	t͡ʃʰ		
Affricate	voiced		d͡z	d͡ʒ		
Affricate	breathy		d͡zʱ	d͡ʒʱ		
Semi vowels		w				
Spirants			s			ɦ
Vibrant			r			
Lateral			l			

Vowels
	Front	Central	Back
Near-close/high	iː		uː
mid higher	ɛ ɛː		ɔ ɔː
Near-open/low		ä äː ä̃ː	

== Sociolinguistic situation ==
According to a 1996 sociolinguistic survey, Lohari is spoken in about 85 households belonging to the metalsmith caste of Lahul. The largest concentration of Lohari speakers is in Gondhla where 12 Lohar families reside. Elsewhere in Lahul, it is typical for just one Lohar family to live in a village. Some Lohari speakers believe that their language resembles Chinali but not to the degree of mutual intelligibility. There exists a belief that Chinali is close to Sanskrit, whereas Lohari is more similar to Hindi. A sample of Lohari as spoken in Gondhla and Gawzang shows a 73 percent lexical similarity to the Chinali varieties of Gushal and Nalda. The similarity between the two varieties of Lohari is 82 percent.

Of all languages spoken in Lahul, Lohari is among the least likely ones to be learned by someone who does not speak it natively, perhaps owing to the lower social status of the metalsmith caste. Nevertheless, Lohari speakers have a positive attitude towards their language. 100 percent of those surveyed by SIL said Lohari was "as good as Hindi", compared to 90 percent of Bunan speakers and 83 percent of Stod Bhoti speakers. The Lohars have the lowest literacy rate of all Lahuli communities. In 1996, 67 percent reported being literate in Hindi and 13 percent in English.
