= Dangri language =

Dangri language may refer to:

- a dialect of the Khandeshi language
- the Dhanki language
