= Magari language =

Bhil variety of India

Magari
- Magra ki Boli
- Ethnicity: Bhil
- Language family: Indo-European: Indo-Iranian; Indo-Aryan; Western Indo-Aryan; Bhil; Northern; Magari

Language codes
- ISO 639-3: –
- Glottolog: magr1238

The Magari language, Magra ki Boli, is a variety of Bhil in India. Ethnologue lumps it under Bhil proper.
