= Bhil languages =

Indo-Aryan language group of India

Bhil
- Geographic distribution: India
- Ethnicity: Bhil people
- Linguistic classification: Indo-European: Indo-Iranian; Indo-Aryan; Western; Bhil
- Subdivisions: Northern; Central; Bareli

Language codes
- Glottolog: bhil1254
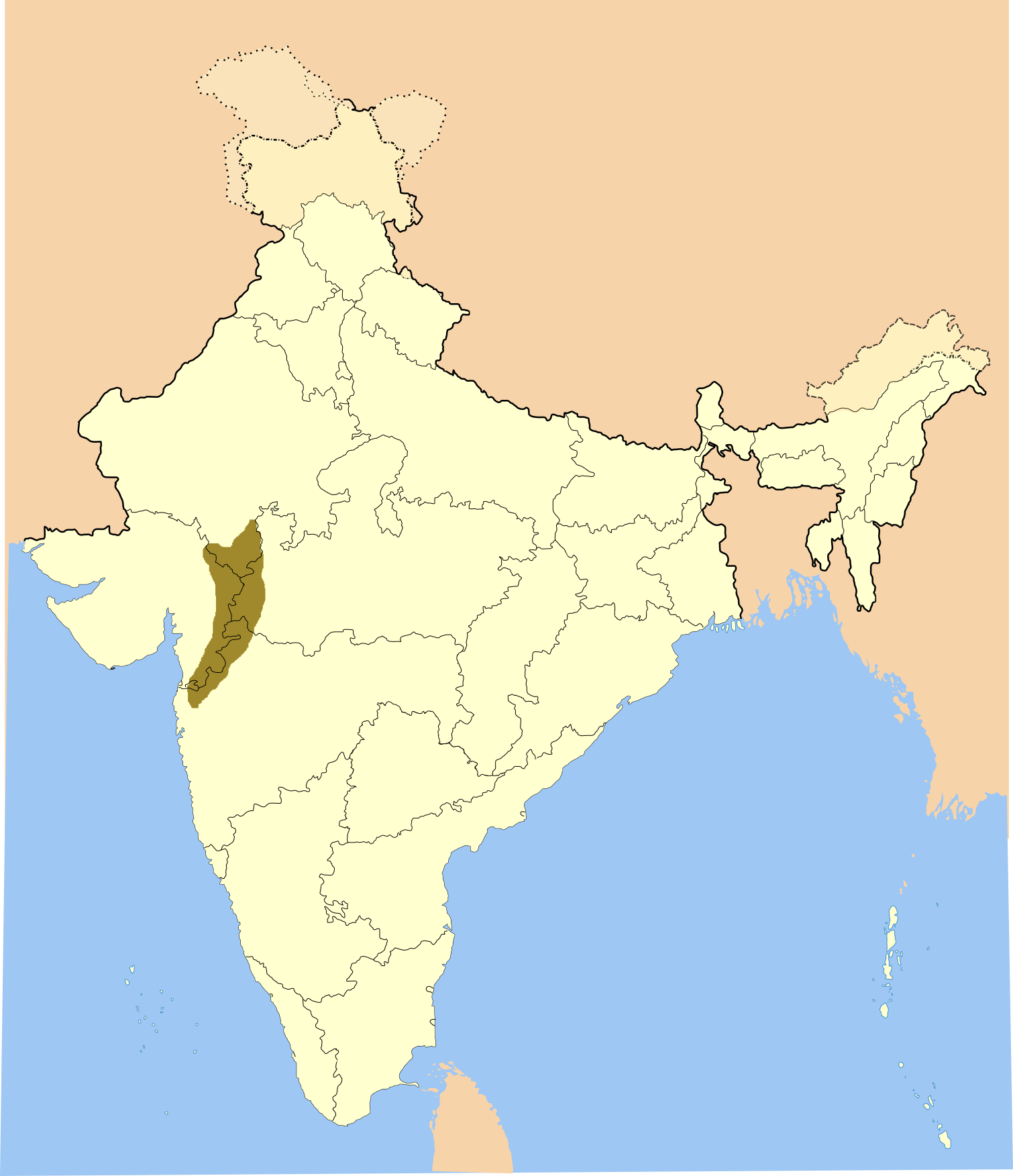
- Bhili-speaking regions of India

The Bhil languages are a group of lects spoken by the Bhil that are classified as dialects of Indo-Aryan languages such as Gujarati and Rajasthani. They are spoken by around 10.4 million Bhils in western and central India as of 2011 and constitute the primary languages of the southern Aravalli Range in Rajasthan and the western Satpura Range in Madhya Pradesh, northwestern Maharashtra, and southern Gujarat.

According to the 52nd report of the commissioner for linguistic minorities in India, Ministry of Minority Affairs, Bhili is the most commonly spoken language of the district of Dadra and Nagar Haveli constituting 40.42% of its total population. Bhili speakers are also significant in the states of Gujarat (4.75%), Madhya Pradesh (4.93%) and Rajasthan (4.60%).

== Relationship ==
The Bhil languages form a link midway between the Gujarati language and the Rajasthani–Marwari languages.

Grouped geographically, the Bhil languages are the following:

- Northern Bhil
  - Bauria
  - Wagdi (perhaps central: reportedly highly intelligible with Adiwasa, Patelia, and other varieties of Bhil proper)
  - Bhilori (Noiri, Dungra)
  - Magari (Magra ki Boli; incl. under Bhili proper in Ethnologue)
- Central Bhil
  - Bhili proper (Patelia), Bhilodi, Adiwasa & Rajput Garasia [mutually intelligible; some intelligible with Marwari]
  - Bhilali (Rathawi)
  - Chodri
  - Dhodia–Kukna
  - Dhanki
  - Dubli
- Eastern Bhil (Bareli)
  - Palya Bareli
  - Pauri Bareli
  - Rathwi Bareli
  - Pardhi
  - Kalto (Nahali)

Other Bhil languages include Gamit (Gamti) and Mawchi. Vasavi is spoken by ethnic Bhils, but may be closer to Gujarati. Similarly, Malvi and Nimadi may be closer to Rajasthani. The recently described Vaagri Booli may also be a Bhil language.

== See also ==
- Rathwi Bareli
- Languages of India
- Gujarati language
- Gujarati people
- Languages with official status in India
- List of Indian languages by total speakers
