= Bawari =

Bawari may refer to: Hindu, Pandit Cast from Uttarakhand Kumaon region in India. Regional language of Bawari cast is Kumaoni and hindi.

- Bawari or Bauria language, a Bhil language of India.
- bawari, or baori, a local Hindu and Urdu term for stepwells in India and Pakistan.
