= Chinali–Lahul languages =

Pair of closely related languages within the Indo-Aryan languages

Chinali–Lahuli
- Geographic distribution: Himachal Pradesh
- Linguistic classification: Indo-European: Indo-Iranian; Indo-Aryan; Northern; Western Pahari; Bhadarwahic; Chinali–Lahuli

Language codes
- Glottolog: chin1493

The Chinali–Lahul languages, or Chinali–Lahuli, are a pair of closely related languages within the Western Pahari branch of Indo-Aryan languages. They are,

- Chinali
- Lahul Lohar

The languages have a few thousand or so speakers altogether.
