= Dubli language =

Bhil language of Gujarat, India

Dubli
- Native to: India
- Region: around Gujarat
- Ethnicity: 790,000 (2007)
- Native speakers: 250,000 (2007)
- Language family: Indo-European: Indo-Iranian; Indo-Aryan; Western Indo-Aryan; Bhil; Central; Dubli

Language codes
- ISO 639-3: dub
- Glottolog: dubl1239

Dubli is a Bhil language of Gujarat and neighboring states. Half of ethnic Dubla speak Gujarati instead of their own ancestral tongue.
