= Od language =

Indo-Aryan language of India and Pakistan

Od
- Odki
- اوڏڪِي
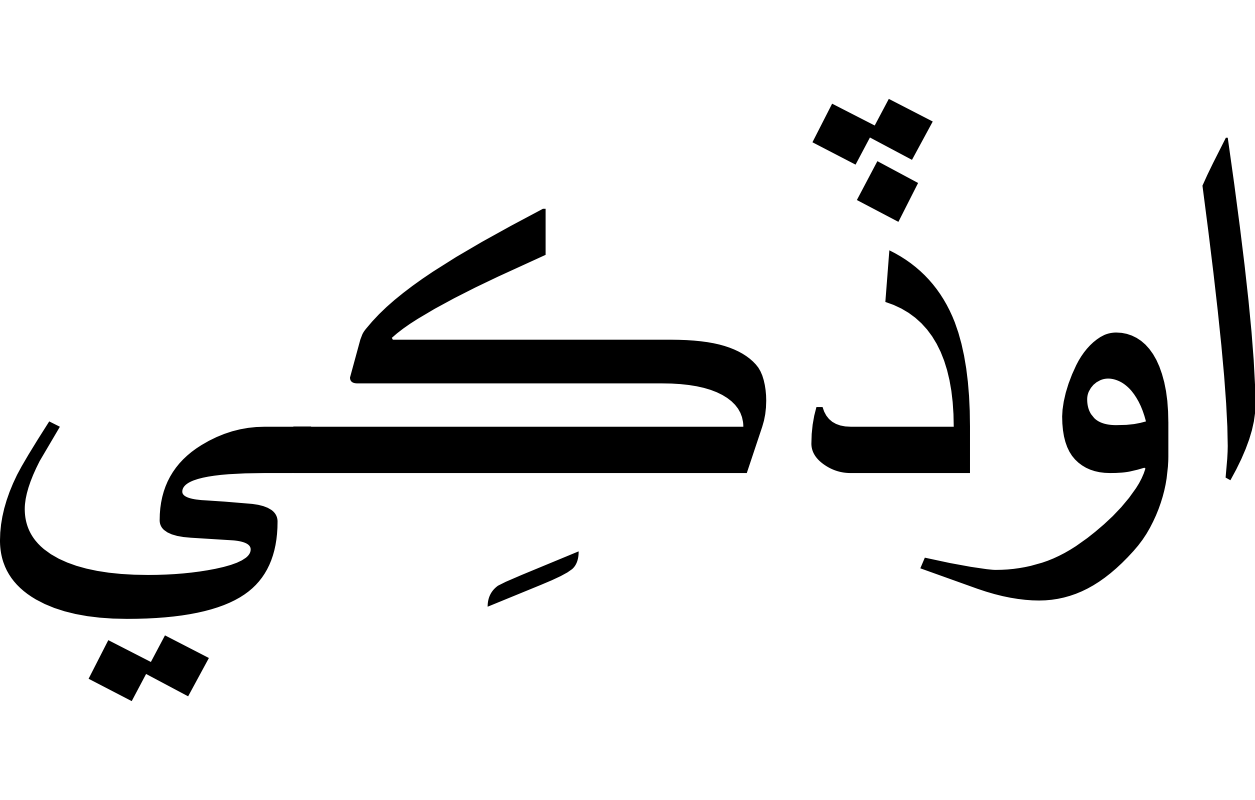
- Native to: India, Pakistan
- Region: Sindh, southern Punjab, Gujarat, Haryana, New Delhi, Rajasthan
- Native speakers: 2 million (2017)
- Language family: Indo-European: Indo-Iranian; Indo-Aryan; Western Indo-Aryan; Rajasthani; Od

Language codes
- ISO 639-3: odk
- Glottolog: oddd1238

Od, also known as Oad or Odki, is an Indo-Aryan language of India and Pakistan. It is spoken by around 2 million people in Gujarat, Rajasthan, Haryana, New Delhi, Punjab and Sindh. It has similarities to Marathi, with features also shared with Gujarati and borrowings from Marwari and Punjabi.

Groups attempting the preservation of the language in Pakistan include Oadki Rakarhanga and OLCDO.
