= Vasavi language =

Western Indo-Aryan language of India

Vasavi
- Vasavi Bhil
- Region: Maharashtra, Gujarat (India)
- Ethnicity: Vasava
- Native speakers: 187,000 (2011)
- Language family: Indo-European: Indo-Iranian; Indo-Aryan; Western Indo-Aryan; Gujaratic; Vasavi
- Writing system: Devanagari, Gujarati

Language codes
- ISO 639-3: vas
- Glottolog: vasa1239

Vasavi is a Western Indo-Aryan language spoken by the Bhil people, though not intelligible with Bhili. The Vasavi live mainly in two districts straddling the Gujarat-Maharashtra border: Bharuch district in Gujarat and Dhule district of Maharashtra. Smaller communities may be found Vadodara and Surat districts of Gujarat and in south western Madhya Pradesh.

The language goes by various names: Adiwasi Bhil, Keski Bhil, and (Padwi) Bhilori. Dialects include Ambodiya, Dhogri (Dungri), Khataliya, Kot (Kotne), and Dehvaliya (Kolch), which is spoken in Maharashtra and has Marathi influence.
