= Goaria language =

Marwari language of Sindh, Pakistan

Goaria
- Native to: Pakistan
- Region: Sindh
- Ethnicity: Marwari people
- Native speakers: (25,000 cited 2000)
- Language family: Indo-European: Indo-Iranian; Indo-Aryan; Western; Rajasthani; Marwari; Goaria

Language codes
- ISO 639-3: gig
- Glottolog: goar1239

Goaria is a Marwari language of the Rajasthani branch of Indo-Aryan languages, spoken by approximately 25,000 people in Sindh Province, Pakistan. The Goaria people are predominantly Hindu and use Hindi for religious worship.

== Classification ==
Goaria is classified within the Marwari subgroup of the Rajasthani languages. It is one of several Rajasthani-related languages spoken by Hindu communities in Sindh, alongside Dhatki and Marwari.

== Status ==
According to Ethnologue, Goaria is a stable language with an EGIDS rating of 6a (Vigorous), meaning it is used as a first language by all generations within the ethnic community. The language is not taught in schools.

== See also ==
- Languages of Pakistan
- Hinduism in Pakistan
- Rajasthani languages
