= Bauria language =

Indo-Aryan language spoken in India

Bauria
- ਬੌਰੀਆ / بوریا
- Native to: India
- Ethnicity: Bhil
- Native speakers: 63,029 (2011 census)
- Language family: Indo-European: Indo-Iranian; Indo-Aryan; Western Indo-Aryan; Bhil; Northern; Bauria

Language codes
- ISO 639-3: bge
- Glottolog: baur1251

Bauria, also called Baori, is a Bhil language of India. It is spoken by the Babaria and Moghia. It is closely related to Habura, Pardhi, and Siyalgir

== Classification and grammar ==
Bauria is a Bhil language. The /s/ phoneme regularly becomes [k^{h}], except before /i/ or /e/. /k^{h}/ may weaken to [h].

The genitive posposition is nō or nan (feminine nī, oblique masculine nā). The dative is nū̃, nē, nai, or nā̃. Nā̃ is borrowed from the surrounding Punjabi. The oblique suffix is often weakened to n, as in tihōn, 'to them'. The ablative suffix is thō, which agrees in gender and case with the governing noun. The locative and agentive suffixes are -ē.

The pronouns are as follows:

Case	Singular			Plural		
Case	1st	2nd	3rd	1st	2nd	3rd
Nominative	hū̃	taū̃, tū̃	yōh, tiō	hamē̃	tamē̃	tē, tēhē
Oblique	mannē		tīnē		tauhē̃	tēhō, tīhō, tihōn
Genitive	m(h)ārō	tā(h^{a})rō	inhō	hamārō	tamāh^{a}rō	tēhōnō, tihōnō
Locative	mī̃	tī̃, tēn	tīnē, tē̃	hamē̃	tamē̃	tē, tēhē

The verb substantive is sō̃ 'I am' and uttō 'was'. uttō becomes -tō when used as an auxiliary to form the perfective. The present continuous uses sō̃ as an auxiliary. The past participle ends un -iō. The negative verb prefixes kō-.

== Sample passage ==
The following is a sample passage provided by Grierson:

Ēk janā-nai bai dīk^{a}r-ā uttā.
One man-DAT two son-PL were
A man had two sons.

Tihō-mai-thē nanōṛ-ē dīkr-ē āgā-nai kēh^{a}wā lagiō, 'ō āgā, jō ap^{a}rō̃ walēwō hi-riō tihā-mai-thō mannē bhāg^lō dai-dē.'
3PL-LOC-AGT younger-NOM son-NOM father-OBL say begin-PST.PAS, 'o father, what GEN.2SG property remain-PST.PAS that-ABL 1SG.OBL share give-away."
The younger began to say to the father, "Oh father, what property is for you to give to me?"

Ti-nē tihōn walēwō waṇḍī diddō.
3SG-AGT 3PL-DAT property divide-PRF give-PST.PAS.
He gave them his divided property

Ghanā dan kō-thāiā-nahī̃ tē nanōrē dīk^{a}rē kharō walēwō bhēlō karī-liddō,
many days NEG-be.PST-at.all then younger-AGT son-AGT all property together collect-PST.PAS
Not many days passed until the younger son collected all the property
