= Bhilori language =

Indo-Aryan language spoken in India

Bhilori
- Ethnicity: Bhil
- Native speakers: (200,000 cited 2000–2003)
- Language family: Indo-European: Indo-Iranian; Indo-Aryan; Western Indo-Aryan; Bhil; Northern; Bhilori

Language codes
- ISO 639-3: Either: noi – Noiri duh – Dungra
- Glottolog: noir1238 Noiri dung1251 Dungra

Bhilori is a Bhil language of India. There are 100,000 speakers of each of the two varieties, Dungra and Noiri, which are highly intelligible with each other.

Noiri is one of the Scheduled Tribes of India.
