= Kamar language =

Indic language of India

Kamar
- Native to: India
- Region: Madhya Pradesh, Chhattisgarh
- Native speakers: 40,000 (2003)
- Language family: Indo-European: Indo-Iranian; Indo-Aryan; Eastern; Halbic; Kamar

Language codes
- ISO 639-3: keq
- Glottolog: kama1350

Kamar is an Indic language spoken by a tribal people of central India. It is spoken in two districts, one in Madhya Pradesh and one in Chhattisgarh.
