= Bhunjia language (Halbic) =

Indo-Aryan language spoken in India

Bhunjia
- Native to: India
- Region: Odisha, Chhattisgarh
- Native speakers: (6790 cited 2000)
- Language family: Indo-European: Indo-Iranian; Indo-Aryan; Eastern; Halbic; Bhunjia

Language codes
- ISO 639-3: bhu
- Glottolog: bhun1242 Bhunjia

Bhunjia is an Eastern Indo-Aryan language of eastern India spoken by the Bhunjia community living in the states of Odisha and Chhattisgarh.
