= Dameli language =

Indo-Aryan language spoken in Pakistan

Dameli
- Dāmya bāṣa
- Native to: Pakistan
- Region: Khyber Pakhtunkhwa
- Native speakers: (5,000 cited 2001)
- Language family: Indo-European: Indo-Iranian; Indo-Aryan or Nuristani; Dameli

Language codes
- ISO 639-3: dml
- Glottolog: dame1241
- ELP: Dameli

Dameli, also Damɛ̃ḍī, Dāmia bāṣa Damia, or Gidoj, is an Indo-Iranian language of uncertain classification spoken by approximately 5,000 people in the Domel Valley, in the Chitral District of Khyber Pakhtunkhwa Province, Pakistan.

The Domel Valley is about ten miles south of Drosh on the east end of Chitral River, on the road from the Mirkhani Fort to the pass of Arundu. Dameli is still the main language in the villages where it is spoken, and is regularly learned by children. Most of the men speak Pashto as a second language, and some also speak Khowar and Urdu, but there are no signs of massive language change.

== Study ==
Emil Perder's 2013 dissertation, A Grammatical Description of Dameli, based on the author's field work, is the first comprehensive description of the Dameli language. Before Perder's work, the main source of information on Dameli was an article by Georg Morgenstierne, published in 1942: "Notes on Dameli: A Kafir-Dardic Language of the Chitral". A sociolinguistic survey written by Kendall Decker (1992) contains a chapter on Dameli.

== Classification ==
The language has been traditionally classified as an Indo-Aryan language of the Kunar subgroup of Dardic languages, notable for containing a significant degree of words deriving from the Nuristani languages, even in basic vocabulary, though the pronoun system and morphology are characteristically of Dardic origin. After a recent reevaluation by Perder (2013), however, its status within Indo-Iranian family as a Nuristani or Dardic language remains uncertain.

The Dardic languages were first thought to be as an independent branch within Indo-Iranian, but today they are placed within Indo-Aryan following Morgenstierne's work.

== Phonology ==
The following tables set out the phonology of the Dameli Language.

=== Vowels ===
	Front	Back
High	i,iː	u
Mid	e,eː	oː
Low	a	ɑː

Vowels are distinguished by quality, length, and nasality. It is possible that [u] and [o] may serve as variants of /u/ and /u:/. Occasionally, the vowels /u/ and /i/ can be reanalyzed as semivowels /w/ and /j/, respectively, in order to fit the syllable structure.

=== Consonants ===
		Labial	Coronal	Retroflex	Palatal	Velar	Uvular	Glottal
Nasal		m	n	ɳ (ṇ)		(ŋ)		
Stop	voiceless	p	t	ʈ (ṭ)		k	(q)	
Stop	voiced	b	d	ɖ (ḍ)		g		
Stop	aspirated	pʰ	tʰ	ʈʰ		kʰ		
Affricate	plain		ts (ċ)	tʂ (c̣)	tʃ (č)			
Affricate	aspirated		tsʰ	tʂʰ	tʃʰ			
Fricative	voiceless		s	ʂ (ṣ)	ʃ (š)	x		h
Fricative	voiced			ʐ (ẓ)	ʒ (ž)	ɣ		
Approximant		ʋ (w)	l	ɻ (ẉ)	j ()			
Rhotic			r	ɽ (ṛ)				

=== Tones ===
Perder distinguishes two tones: rising and falling, but concludes that they require further study.

=== Syllable structure ===
Dameli has a limited amount of syllable structures. Consonants clusters are allowed at the onset and coda, but only with a certain set of consonants. Any consonant except /ɳ/ can appear at the start of a syllable. In word final position, only voiceless unaspirated stops can occur.

== Morphology ==
=== Nouns ===
Nouns can be inflected for number and case and refer to things that are inanimate or animate. They belong either to the masculine or feminine gender. However, the gender system is in decline among speakers. The general plural suffix is -nam. However, some words borrowed from Pashto retain their plural suffixes.

==== Cases ====
Dameli is a split ergative language. With past and perfective forms, the system is ergative, and with nonpast and perfective forms, the system is accusative. There are two sets of cases: core and periphery. The 'core' cases include the unmarked/nominative form and the ergative form, and the periphery cases include the locative and instrumental. Kinship terms may also include a separate case, called the vocative. The nominative case is typically unmarked in the imperfective and nonpast forms, as seen in this example.

i žami c̣ʰiir brikin-ni
3SG.ANIM.PROX woman milk sell-IMPRF.3SG.F
This woman is selling milk

However, in the past and perfective forms, it becomes the marked ergative case.

mas-sãã putr-es-ee tasãã-Ø ɡram ta ek mač žan-ee
3SG.ANIM.PROX-POSS son-KIN.3-ERG 3SG-POSS-M village of one man kill-PFV.3SG
His son killed a man from his village.

The locative is created by adding the suffix -a to the end of the noun. It can also be used to encode a third argument in an ditransitive verb.

tu kul-a t^{h}op-i
2SG.NOM house-LOC be.IMPFV.2SG-Q
Are you home?

The instrumental case is formed by adding the suffix -ee.

ay braadun-ee wigi-num
1SG.NOM catapult-INS fire-IMPFV.1SG
I am shooting with a catapult

Instrumental case can also be used to denote a place along the way to somewhere else or to express how something is said in another language.

==== Kinship ====
The kinship system of Dameli takes into account relative age, relative generation, gender, and whether the relationship is by-blood or by-marriage. Seven generations are distinguished: the generation of the anchor and the three generations preceding or following them. The third generation preceding the anchor is only used in the term for great-grandfather, parbap and the term for grandfather, bap, is used to mean ancestor. All kinship terms are distinguished by gender, and may or may not share the same root. The anchor's gender is also occasionally taken into account; the term used for a woman's mother-in-law is not the same as a man's. For relative age, the anchor is generally considered, but in the case of relatives by marriage, the parent's age is considered.

Kinship terms
Consanguineal kin		Affinal kin	
Term	Gloss	Term	Gloss
parbap	great-grandfather	pašur	father-in-law, wife's maternal uncle
bap, baloodadi	grandfather	ǰeṣṭaali	wife's mother, wife's maternal aunt
yei, balooyi	grandmother	preeš	husband's mother
dadi	father	pʰaapa	paternal aunt's husband
yii	mother	mamaani	maternal uncle's wife
pitri	paternal uncle	žami, ištrii	wife, woman
ǰeṣṭadadi	paternal uncle (older)	aštrakaa	wives, women
mažuma dadi	paternal uncle (middle)	bareu, mač	husband, man
sureedadi, učuṭadadi	paternal uncle (younger)	ẓami	wife's brother, sister's husband
pʰaapi	paternal aunt	saaraani	wife's sister
žeṣṭeri pʰaapi	paternal aunt (older)	deer	husband's brother
mažumi pʰaapi	paternal aunt (middle)	ǰeṣṭa deer	husband's older brother
surui pʰaapi	paternal aunt (younger)	mažuma deer	husband's brother (middle)
nan	maternal aunt, father's sister in law	suruu deer	husband's younger brother
žeṣṭi	maternal aunt (older)	žamili	husband's sister
mam	maternal uncle, mother's brother-in-law	bražei	brother's wife
braa, braadi (pl.)	brother	saaraana	sister's husband, wife's sister's husband
bay	brother (older)	bawi	son's wife, nephew's wife
suree	brother (younger)	zaamaa	daughter's husband, niece's husband
pas, pasari (pl.)	sister	abeeni	co-wife
bibi	sister (older)	dram	friend, blood-brother
surei	sister (younger)	paai	boy
put	son, fraternal nephew	brei	girl
žu	daughter, fraternal niece	kuẉa, zaatak	child
ṣpaṣi	sororal nephew, sororal niece		
nawaasa (m.), nawaasi (f.)	grandson, granddaughter		
kaṛwaasa (m.), kaṛwaasi (f.)	great-grandson, great-granddaughter		

Kinship terms can be inflected in three different ways: an unmarked form, a second person form, and a third person form. Second person is marked with the suffix -un/-in and third person is marked with -es. The suffix -oo, which only occurs on kinship terms, takes on a vocative role as it is used to address the subject. Unlike other nouns, kinship terms generally take the plural suffix -suu instead of -nam.

=== Pronouns ===
Pronouns in Dameli are inflected for five factors: person, number, distance, animacy, and case.

Personal pronouns
Pronoun	Nominative	Oblique	Ergative
1SG	ay	muu	
2SG	tu	too	
3SG.ANIM.PROX	i	mas	manii
3SG.ANIM.DIST	see	tas	tanii
3SG.INAM.PROX	yee		
3SG.INAM.DIST	see		
1PL	ay	amaa	
2PL	bi	mya	
3PL.ANIM.PROX	mẽẽ	masuu	
3PL.ANIM.DIST	tẽẽ	tasuu	
3PL.INAM.PROX	mẽẽ		
3PL.INAM.DIST	tẽẽ		

The locative is formed with the addition of the suffix -a to the oblique form. Third person pronouns can also be used as determiners when inserted in front of a noun.

tu mas paai ku žan-op
2SG.NOM 3SG.ANIM.PROX.OBL boy why kill-PFV.2SG
Why did you kill this boy?

tẽẽ kul naɡi prat-ee
3PL.INAN.DIST house fall give−PFV.3SG
Those houses fell down.

==== Possessive pronouns ====
Possessive pronouns
Gloss	Masculine owned	Feminine owned
1SG	mãã	mããi
2SG	tãã	tããi
3SG.ANIM.PROX	masãã	masããi
3SG.ANIM.DIST	tasãã	tasããi
1PL	amuna	amuni
2PL	mina	mini
3PL.ANIM.PROX	masuna	masuni
3PL.ANIM.DIST	tasuna	tasuni
Possessive marker
3SG.ANIM	sãã	sããi
3PL.ANIM	suna	suni

The possessive reflexive pronoun taanu is used indicate that something is owned by an already-defined person, much like English 'one's own'. It is inflected for gender agreement with the noun it modifies.

==== Interrogative pronouns ====
The interrogative and relative pronouns are kya 'what', kii/kuree 'who', keeraa 'which', and kasãã 'whose'.

=== Adjectives ===
In Dameli, some adjectives show gender agreement and some do not. Generally, dimensions other than gender are not considered. Generally, -a marks agreement with a masculine noun, and -i marks agreement with a feminine noun.

muu ta kaaya aaċ-i daro mãã-i šumaa-i daaman ta gurum
1SG.OBL from remembrance come-CP is 1SG.POSS-F beautiful-F Domel(F) of morning
I remember the morning of my beautiful Domel.

The suffixes -bana and -bani denote similarity to a noun, somewhat like English '-ish' or 'like'. The suffix -baṣ denote ability as in matrambaṣ 'legible' (lit. able to be read). Some more suffixes include -weela, roughly equivalent to 'having x', and -pin 'full of x'.

=== Numerals ===
The basic numerals of Dameli are as follows:

Cardinal numerals
Number	Dameli
1	ek
2	duu
3	traa
4	čoor
5	pããč
6	ṣoo
7	sat
8	aṣ
9	noo
10	daš
11	yaaš
20	biši
21	bišiyoek
40	duubiši
100	pããčbiši, sawa
1000	zara

The numerals are in base ten, but can be analyzed as base 20 in specific cases (ex: traa-biši 'sixty' lit. three-twenty). Ordinal numerals take on the suffix -am. Collective numerals are expressed with the suffix -i.

=== Verbs ===
A typical Dameli verb root contains one or two syllables. Roots can be intransitive, transitive, or ditransitive. The main distinction is between transitive and intransitive verbs. Some common verbs use alternative roots when in the perfective aspect. For example, in the verb 'to die', the root naṣṭ is used in the perfective and the root br in other contexts. The causative suffix -a (used in the future and perfective) and -aai (used in the imperfective and past). Verbs may also use the 'second causative', becoming ditransitive. Verbs are inflected for six finite tense-aspect-mood categories: perfective, imperfective, indirect past, potential past, future, and imperative. There are an additional five non-finite tense-aspect-mood qualities: infinitive, present participle, past participle, inchoative participle, and conjunctive participle.

Dameli verbs are inflected for person, number, gender, evidentiality, and TAM. The past tense marker taa is used when forming complex TAM constructions.

==== Copulas ====
Two different copula verbs are used: one for animate subjects and one for inanimate subjects.

Tense	Animate	Inaminate
Imperfective	t^{h}-	daru
Present	t^{h}-	daru
Perfective	t^{h}-	beru
Past	t^{h}-	beru
Future	b-	
Indirect past	bai-	
Present participle	baal	
Past participle	baisan	
Conjunctive participle	bai	

==== Perfective ====
Form	Intransitive	Transitive	Causative
1SG	-úm		-m
2SG	-óp		-p
3SG.M	-aa	-ee	
3SG.F	-úi	-ee	
1PL	-úma		-ama
2PL	-óba		-aba
3PL	-ún	-én	-en

The perfective aspect is the most basic verb form, describing an action as a singular, whole occurrence. It also refers to events that the speaker witnessed.

==== Imperfective ====
Form	Intransitive/Transitive	Causative
1SG	-num	-m
2SG	-nap	-ap
3SG.M	-na	-a
3SG.F	-ni	-i
1PL	-numa	-ma
2PL	-naba	-ba
3PL	-nun	-n

The imperfective form expresses the simple present, the continuous past, and completed actions with currently relevant outcomes. Combining the imperfective with taa creates the past continuous form.

==== Indirect Past ====
Form	Intransitive	Transitive	Causative
1SG	-t^{h}um		
2SG	-t^{h}op		
3SG.M	-t^{h}aa	-t^{h}ee	
3SG.F	-t^{h}ui	-t^{h}ee	
1PL	-t^{h}uma		
2PL	-t^{h}oba		
3PL	-t^{h}un	-t^{h}en	

The indirect past is used to indicate events that the speaker did not directly witness in the past.

==== Potential past ====
Form	Inflection
1SG	-tʰim
2SG	-tʰis
3SG.M	-tʰiyo
3SG.F	-tʰima
1PL	-tʰima
2PL	-tʰiba
3PL	-tʰin

The potential past is used to indicate events that may have happened in the past, but that the speaker is not sure of.

==== Future ====
Form	Inflection
1SG	-im
2SG	-es
3SG	-o
1PL	-ima
2PL	-iba
3PL	-in

==== Imperative ====
Form	Intransitive/Transitive	Causative
SG	-ee	-i
PL	-aa	-ya

The imperative is used to indicate commands and requests.

==== Non-finite ====
Non-finite verb forms
Form	Suffix
Infinitive	-an
Present participle	-aal
Past participle	-isan
Inchoative participle	-em
Conjunctive participle	-i

An epenthetic vowel is inserted if the suffix would otherwise create a non-compatible cluster. The infinity functions as a 'verbal noun'. The conjunctive participle functions as a converb, mainly serving to mark the adverb. In negative imperatives, the prohibitive marker ma is used before the imperative verb form.

==== Causative ====
Verbs can take a causative and 'second causative' suffix. Generally, an intransitive verb will become transitive with a causative suffix, and ditransitive with a second causative suffix. For instance, the verb 'to sit' has three levels of causativity:

taga tali ay aram-a ni niš-im tee
before? until 1SG.NOM rest-LOC not sit-FUT.1SG that
I will not sit down to rest, until…

ãã muu keeraa paai madrasa-a niš-aai-tʰum ba
and 1SG.ERG which boy madrasa-LOC sit-CAUS-INDIRPST.1SG TOP
And the boy that I sat in the madrassah...

ay mãã-Ø maam-a ṣawaai mas niš-aw-aai-m
1SG.NOM 1SG.POSS−M maternal.uncle−OBL by 3SG.ANIM.PROX sit−CAUS2−CAUS−PFV.1SG
I sat him down through my uncle (I asked my uncle to calm him down)

The first example uses the intransitive verb to refer to the act of sitting; the second example uses the transitive verb to describe the act of making someone else sit, and the third example uses a second causative to describe the action of the subject, I, making the object, the boy, sit through the medium of the uncle.

=== Postpositions ===
There are two major categories of postpositions: those that require the locative case and those that don't. There are five postpositions that require the preceding noun to have the locative case: ki 'to', ṣaži 'in order to', ṣawaai 'for, by, through', mili 'with (comitative)', and ĩĩ 'appropriate place.' ṣawaai is primarily used to describe the second argument of a ditransitive verb. ĩĩ is always cliticized to the preceding noun. Other, non-locative pospositions are ta 'from, of, than', ṣaa 'on', neẉ 'under', taprei 'for', bãĩ 'towards', tagii 'from', and tali 'until.

=== Question words ===
The basic non-prominal question words are as follows:

Word	Gloss
keer	when
kanuu	how
ku	why
kaa	where (general)
kutaal	where (direction)
kati	how many
kya	what

== Syntax ==
Dameli exhibits typical Indo-Aryan syntax. The default word order for most clause types is Subject-Object-Verb. The basic clause can contain a clause adverbial, the subject, and the predicate, consisting of the object and verb. The clause adverbial provides context for the rest of the clause. The subject, a noun phrase, declares the agent of the verb. Indirect objects are generally placed before direct objects. Locative predicates are generally postnominal. Negation is typically placed before the verb it negates.

The basic noun phrase has three sections: a determiner (indicating number or proximity), an attribute (adjective or adverb), and a head (noun). In this phrase, ek 'one' serves as the determiner, lee ɣarib 'very poor' serves as an attribute, and mač 'man' serves as the head.

ek lee ɣarib mač
one very poor man
A very poor man

Adverbials can express time (i.e. yesterday, tomorrow), space (i.e. here, far), and intensifiers (i.e. very).

Common adverbials
Gloss	Dameli
yesterday	doos
today	mudya
tomorrow	beraa ki
here	ayaa
there	tara
near	oor
far	p^{h}ar
very/many	lee

Coordination in Dameli is when two qualities which are expected to occur together and form a single unit. They can be formed using the clitic -o or by putting the terms in sequences, such as yei bap 'grandfather and grandmother' and aan-o baraan 'inside and outside'. Conjunction coordination is expressed with the coordinator ãã. Disjunctive coordination is expressed with kuu or ya 'or'. Adversative coordination (like English 'but') is expressed with leekin and xu.

The topic particles ta and ba denote a previously mentioned topic and a new topic, respectively. The vocative particle a can be placed in front of any description word to create a vocative clause.

== Writing ==
Dameli speakers primarily learn to write in Urdu. In the 21st century, there have been attempts to create an orthography for Dameli itself based on the Urdu alphabet.

== See also ==
- Languages of Pakistan
- Languages of Chitral
