= Chodri language =

Bhil language of Gujarat, India

Chodri
- Chowdhary
- Native to: India
- Region: around Gujarat
- Native speakers: 110,570 (2011 census)
- Language family: Indo-European: Indo-Iranian; Indo-Aryan; Western Indo-Aryan; Bhil; Central; Chodri

Language codes
- ISO 639-3: cdi
- Glottolog: chod1238

Chaudhari (Chowdhary) is a tribal language of Gujarat and neighboring states.
