= Dawoodi language =

Indo-Aryan language of northern Pakistan

Dawoodi
- Domaaki
- Native to: Pakistan
- Region: Nager and Hunza Valleys
- Ethnicity: Domaa
- Native speakers: 340 (2011)
- Language family: Indo-European: Indo-Iranian; Indo-Aryan; Western Indo-Aryan; Dawoodi
- Writing system: Arabic script

Language codes
- ISO 639-3: dmk
- Glottolog: doma1260
- ELP: Domaaki

Dawoodi (دَاؤُدِی), also known as Domaakí (ڈوماکی), Ḍumāki, or Domaá, is an endangered Indo-Aryan language spoken by a few hundred people living in the Gilgit-Baltistan territory in northern Pakistan. It is historically related to the Central Indo-Aryan languages of the Indian Midlands, though it has been significantly influenced by its neighbours.

The speakers of the language belong to a small ethnic minority that lives dispersed among the larger regional groups. The majority of Doma communities have in the past switched to the dominant Shina language, with their original language surviving only in the Burushaski areas of Nagar and Hunza. There is a distinct dialect in each of those two areas; they are still mutually intelligible despite numerous differences.

According to local traditions, the Dooma's ancestors came somewhere from the south; according to the speakers themselves their forebears arrived in the Nager and Hunza Valleys from Kashmir, and north Punjab in separate groups and over an extended period of time via Baltistan, Gilgit, Darel, Tangir, Punial and even Kashghar.

All Dawoodi speakers are proficient in the languages of their host communities (Burushaski and/or Shina) as well as in their own mother tongue. Many of them also know Urdu, which they have learned at school or picked up while working in other parts of Pakistan.

The name Domaki is perceived as pejorative by the speakers, who nowadays prefer the term Dawoodi, which is associated with the Islamic figure of Dawood.

== Bibliography ==
- Backstrom, Peter C. Languages of Northern Areas (Sociolinguistic Survey of Northern Pakistan, 2), 1992. 417 pp. ISBN 969-8023-12-7.
- Hussain, Qandeel (2020). "Dawoodi (Pakistan) – Language Snapshot". Language Documentation and Description. 19: 130–137. doi:10.25894/ldd69.
- Lorimer, D. L. R. 1939. The Dumaki Language: Outlines of the Speech of the Doma, or Bericho, of Hunza, Dekker & Van De Vegt, 244 pp.
- Weinreich, Matthias (2008). "Two Varieties of Domaakí". Zeitschrift der Deutschen Morgenländischen Gesellschaft. 158 (2): 299–316. JSTOR 10.13173/zeitdeutmorggese.158.2.0299.
- Weinreich, Matthias (2010). "Language Shift in Northern Pakistan: The Case of Domaakí and Pashto". Iran and the Caucasus. 14 (1): 43–56. doi:10.1163/157338410X12743419189342.
