= Rathwi Bareli language =

Bhil language of India

Rathwi
- રાઠવી
- Region: Gujarat, Madhya Pradesh, Maharashtra
- Ethnicity: Rathwa and Bhil
- Native speakers: 359,000 (2011 census)
- Language family: Indo-European: Indo-Iranian; Indo-Aryan; Western Indo-Aryan; Bhil; Bareli; Rathwi
- Writing system: Gujarati

Language codes
- ISO 639-3: bgd
- Glottolog: rath1242

Rathwi Bareli is a Bhil language of India, spoken mainly in Gujarat. It is close to two other languages called Bareli, but not mutually intelligible with them. It has 81%–93% lexical similarity with Rathwi Bareli dialects, 67%–73% with Palya Bareli and 68%–79% with Pauri Bareli.

== See also ==
- Rathva koli
- Koli people
- Languages of India
- Gujarati language
- Gujarati people
- Languages with official status in India
- List of Indian languages by total speakers
- Panchmahal district
- Vadodara district
