= Gamit language =

Bhil language of India

Gamit
- Native to: India
- Region: Gujarat, Maharashtra
- Ethnicity: Gamit
- Native speakers: 140,000 (2011 census)
- Language family: Indo-European: Indo-Iranian; Indo-Aryan; Western; Bhil; Gamit
- Writing system: Devanagari, Gujarati

Language codes
- ISO 639-3: gbl
- Glottolog: gami1242

Gamit is a Bhil language of India, spoken by the Gamit people of Tapi district of Gujarat and by some people in Surat, Bharuch, Dang and Valsad districts of southern Gujarat. It is also spoken in Nandurbar and by some people in Dhule district in northern Maharashtra. Some example of Gamit language story can be found at https://indiantribalheritage.org/?p=25003%5B%5D
