= Pardhi language =

Bhil languages of India

Pardhi
- Bahelia
- Ethnicity: Bhil
- Native speakers: 69,100 (2011 census)
- Language family: Indo-European: Indo-Iranian; Indo-Aryan; Western Indo-Aryan; Bhil; Bareli; Pardhi

Language codes
- ISO 639-3: pcl
- Glottolog: pard1243

Pardhi is a Bhil language, or more likely languages, of India. Dialects are Neelishikari, Pittala Bhasha, Takari, Haran Shikari.
