= Vaagri Booli language =

Unclassified tribal Indo-Aryan language of India

Vaaghri Boli
- Hakkipikki/Narikuravar/Nakkala/Pittalollu
- Native to: India
- Region: Tamil Nadu, Andhra Pradesh, Pondicherry, Karnataka, Telangana, Maharashtra
- Ethnicity: 12,000 (2007)
- Native speakers: 9,300 (2007)
- Language family: Indo-European: Indo-Iranian; Indo-Aryan; (unclassified; Bhili?); Vaaghri Boli
- Writing system: Tamil script

Language codes
- ISO 639-3: vaa
- Glottolog: vaag1238

Vaaghri Boli is an unclassified tribal Indo-Aryan language of southern India. It is not closely related to Hindi or Marathi. Hakkipikki, Nakkala, Pittalollu and other local names for the people mean 'bird catchers'.

== Phonology ==
Vaaghri Boli consonants
		Labial	Dental/ Alveolar	Retroflex	Palatal	Velar
Nasal		m	n	ɳ	ɲ	ŋ
Plosive/ Affricate	voiceless	p	t̪	ʈ	cç	k
Plosive/ Affricate	voiced	b	d̪	ɖ	ɟʝ	g
Fricative	voiceless		s		ç	
Fricative	voiced	v	z			
Trill			r			
Approximant			l	ɭ	j	

Vaaghri Boli vowels
	Front		Central	Back	
	short	long	Central	short	long
Close	i	iː	ɨ	u	uː
Near-close	ɪ̃			ʊ̃	
Mid	e	eː		o	oː
Near-open	æ̞̃				
Open	a	aː			
