= Halbic languages =

Group of languages from India

Halbic
- Geographic distribution: Chhattisgarh, Odisha, Maharashtra, Andhra Pradesh
- Linguistic classification: Indo-European: Indo-Iranian; Indo-Aryan; Eastern; Halbic
- Subdivisions: Halbi; Kamar; Bhunjia; Nahari; Bhatri; Mirgan

Language codes
- Glottolog: halb1246

The Halbic languages belong to the eastern branch of the Indo-Aryan languages and are mainly spoken in southern Chhattisgarh in India. They include Halbi, Kamar, Bhunjia, Nahari, Bhatri and Mirgan.
