= Palya Bareli language =

Bhil language of India

Palya
- Bareli
- Ethnicity: Bhil
- Native speakers: (10,000 cited 2000)
- Language family: Indo-European: Indo-Iranian; Indo-Aryan; Western Indo-Aryan; Bhil; Bareli; Palya

Language codes
- ISO 639-3: bpx
- Glottolog: paly1238

Palya Bareli is a Bhil language of India. It is close to two other languages called Bareli, but not mutually intelligible with them.
