= Nahari language =

Indo-Aryan language of India

Nahari
- Native to: India
- Region: Chhattisgarh and Odisha
- Native speakers: (20,000 cited 2000)
- Language family: Indo-European: Indo-Iranian; Indo-Aryan; Eastern; Halbic; Nahari

Language codes
- ISO 639-3: nhh
- Glottolog: naha1262
- ELP: Nahari

Nahari is an Indo-Aryan language spoken in the states of Chhattisgarh and Odisha in India.
