= Dhanki language =

Bhil language of India

Dhanki
- Native to: India
- Region: Gujarat, Maharashtra, Karnataka, Rajasthan
- Native speakers: 150,674 (2011 census)
- Language family: Indo-European: Indo-Iranian; Indo-Aryan; Western Indo-Aryan; Bhil; Central; Dhanki

Language codes
- ISO 639-3: dhn
- Glottolog: dhan1264

Dhanki is a Bhil language of India, sometimes classified as a dialect of Khandeshi.
