= Bhilali language =

Bhil language of India

Bhilali
- Ethnicity: Bhil
- Native speakers: 1.2 million (2006 & 2011)
- Language family: Indo-European: Indo-Iranian; Indo-Aryan; Western Indo-Aryan; Bhil; Central; Bhilali
- Writing system: Devanagari

Language codes
- ISO 639-3: Either: bhi – Bhilali rtw – Rathawi
- Glottolog: bhil1253 Bhilali rath1243 Rathawi

Bhilali is a Bhil language spoken in India. it has two main varieties: Bhilali proper and Rathawi (Rathwi), which are largely mutually intelligible. A third variety, Parya Bhilali, is more distant but is still considered a dialect of the language.
