= Chinali language =

Unclassified language of India

Chinali
- 𑚏𑚮𑚝𑚥𑚡𑚭𑚋𑚲 Chinalbhashe
- Native to: Himachal Pradesh
- Region: Chandra and Chandrabhaga Valley
- Ethnicity: Chinali
- Native speakers: 215 (2016)
- Language family: Indo-European: Indo-Iranian; Indo-Aryan; (unclassified); Chinali–Lahul; Chinali

Language codes
- ISO 639-3: cih
- Glottolog: chin1475

Chinali (natively called Chinalbhashe) is an unclassified, and critically endangered language of India spoken by about 220 people. Many speakers are well educated. Speakers are distributed throughout Lahul (or Lahaul) Valley. It is written in the Devanagari script. It is possible that Chinali is also closely related to Sanskrit.

== Phonology ==
Consonants
		Labial	Dental	Palatal	Retroflex	Velar/ Glottal
Nasal		m	n	ɲ	ɳ	ŋ
Stop	voiceless	p	t̪		ʈ	k
Stop	aspirated	pʰ	t̪ʰ		ʈʰ	kʰ
Stop	voiced	b	d̪		ɖ	ɡ
Stop	breathy	bʱ	d̪ʱ		ɖʱ	ɡʱ
Affricate	voiceless		t͡s	t͡ʃ		
Affricate	aspirated		t͡sʰ	t͡ʃʰ		
Affricate	voiced		d͡z	d͡ʒ		
Affricate	breathy			d͡ʒʱ		
Semi vowels		w				
Spirants	unvoiced		s	ʃ	ʂ	x
Spirants	voiced		z			ɦ
Vibrant				r	ɽ	
Lateral				l	ɭ	

Vowels
	Front	Central	Back
Near-close/high	iː		uː
mid higher	ɛ ɛː		ɔ
Near-open		ɐ ɐː ɐ̃ː	a aː
