= Bhili language =

Western Indo-Aryan language spoken in west-central India

Bhili
- भीली, ભીલી
- The word "Bhili" written in Devanagari script
- Native to: India
- Region: Bhil Pradesh (Dadra and Nagar Haveli and Daman and Diu, Madhya Pradesh, Gujarat, Rajasthan, Maharashtra)
- Ethnicity: Bhil
- Native speakers: 3,206,533 (2011 census)
- Language family: Indo-European: Indo-Iranian; Indo-Aryan; Western Indo-Aryan; Bhil; Central; Bhili
- Writing system: Devanagari, Gujarati

Language codes
- ISO 639-3: Variously: bhb – Bhili (Bhagoria, Bhilboli, Patelia) gas – Adiwasi Garasia gra – Rajput Garasia (Dungri)
- Glottolog: bhil1251 Bhili rajp1235 Rajput Garasia adiw1235 Adiwasi Garasia
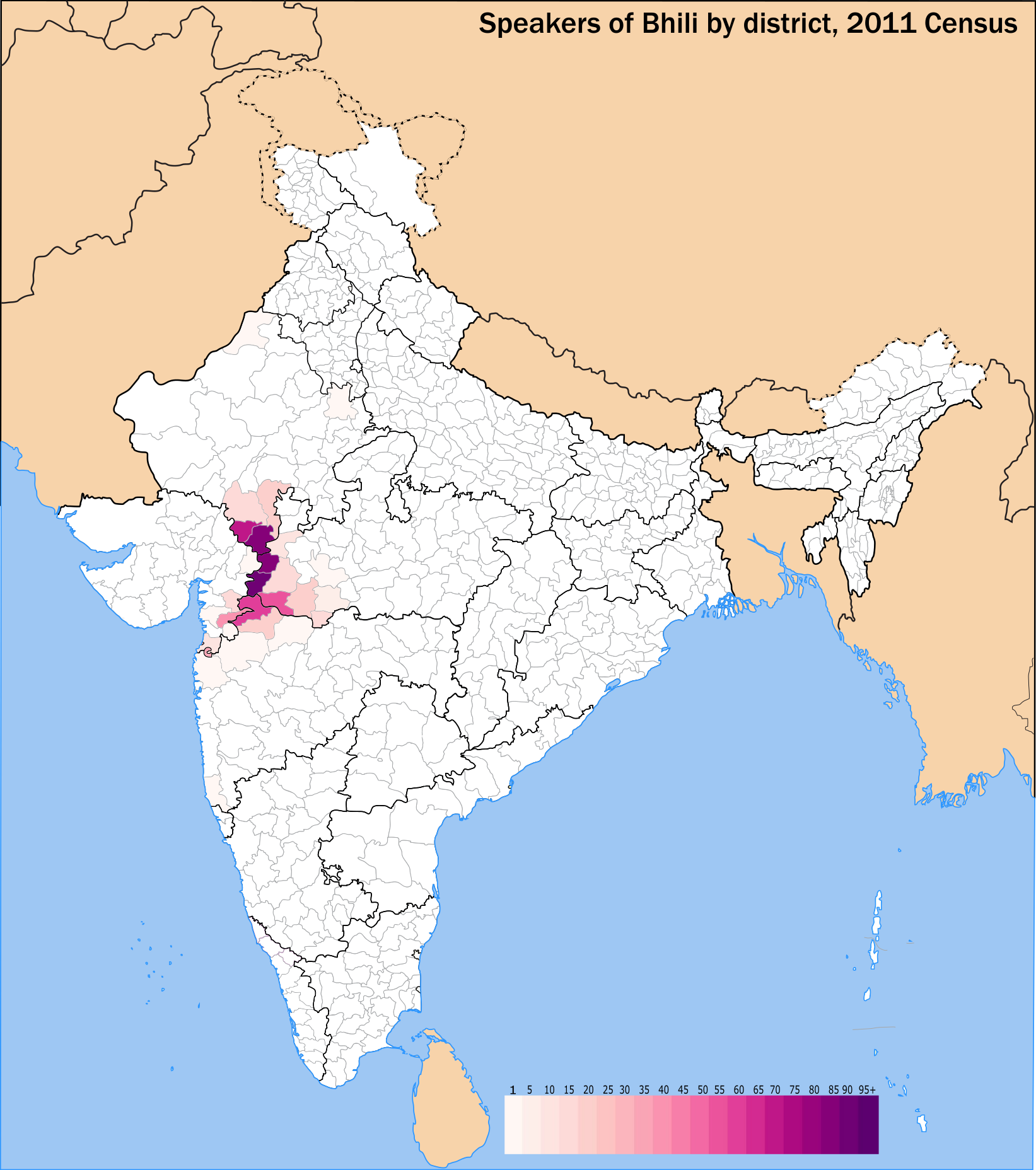
- Percentage Bhili speakers by Indian district, 2011

Bhili (Bhili: भीली, ભીલી), IPA: [bʱiːliː], is a Western Indo-Aryan language spoken in west-central India, in the states of Rajasthan, Gujarat, Maharashtra, and Madhya Pradesh. Other names for the language include Bhilboli and several Bhili varieties are called Garasia. Bhili is a member of the Bhil languages, which are related to Gujarati and Rajasthani. The language is written using the Devanagari script.

Bhili has no official status in India.

== Phonology ==
=== Consonants ===
		Labial	Dental/ Alveolar	Retroflex	Palatal	Velar	Glottal
Stop	voiceless	p	t	ʈ		k	
Stop	aspirated	pʰ	tʰ	ʈʰ		kʰ	
Stop	voiced	b	d	ɖ		ɡ	
Stop	breathy	bʱ	dʱ	ɖʱ		ɡʱ	
Affricate	voiceless				tʃ		
Affricate	voiced				dʒ		
Fricative			s		(ʃ)		h
Nasal		m	n	ɳ		(ŋ)	
Lateral			l	ɭ			
Trill			r				
Approximant		w			j		

- /w/ may also be heard as [ʋ] in free variation.
- /ʃ/ occurs in loanwords from Persian and Hindi.
- [ŋ] is heard as an allophone of /n/ preceding /k/.

=== Vowels ===
	Front	Central	Back
High	i		u
Mid-high	e	ə	o
Mid-low	ɛ	ə	ɔ
Low	(æ)	a	

- Vowels /i, u/ can also be heard as [ɪ, ʊ].
- [æ] is borrowed from Hindi.
- /ə/ may also be heard as [ɤ] in final position.

== See also ==
- Languages of India
- Languages with official status in India
- List of Indian languages by total speakers
