= Kalto language =

Indo-Aryan language of India

Kalto
- Nahali
- Region: Nandurbar and Jalgaon Districts, on the border of Maharashtra and Madhya Pradesh
- Native speakers: 15,000 (2003)
- Language family: Indo-European: Indo-Iranian; Indo-Aryan; Western Indo-Aryan; Bhil; Kalto

Language codes
- ISO 639-3: nlx
- Glottolog: naha1261

Kalto, or Nahali, is an Indo-Aryan language of India. Kalto is the endonym; the exonym "Nahal" or "Nihal" is disparaging. Because of the name "Nahali", the language has often been confused with Nihali, an apparent language isolate spoken by a neighbouring people with a similar lifestyle.
