= Indo-Aryan languages =

Branch of the Indo-Iranian languages

Indo-Aryan
- Indic (Note: In a colloquial context, the term "Indic" sometimes refers more generally to the languages of the Indian subcontinent, thus including Dravidian and other non-Indo-Aryan languages.)
- Geographic distribution: South Asia, Europe
- Native speakers: (est. 800 million cited 2000's)
- Linguistic classification: Indo-European: Indo-Iranian; Indo-Aryan
- Proto-language: Proto-Indo-Aryan
- Subdivisions: Central; Dardic; Eastern; Northern; Northwestern; Southern; Western; Unclassified: • Bhariati • Bazigar • Chinali–Lahuli • Sheikhgal • Mitanni

Language codes
- ISO 639-2 / 5: inc
- Glottolog: indo1321
- Linguasphere: 59=
- Present-day geographical distribution of the major Indo-Aryan language groups. Romani, Domari, Kholosi, Luwati, Parya, Fiji Hindi and Caribbean Hindustani are outside the scope of the map. Pashai (Dardic) Khowar (Dardic) Shina (Dardic) Kohistani (Dardic) Kashmiri (Dardic) Punjabi (Northwestern) Sindhi (Northwestern) Rajasthani (Western) Gujarati (Western) Khandeshi (Western) Bhili (Western) Western Pahari (Northern) Central Pahari (Northern) Eastern Pahari (Northern) Western Hindi (Central) Eastern Hindi (Central) Bengali-Assamese (Eastern) Bihari (Eastern) Odia (Eastern) Halbic (Eastern) Marathi-Konkani (Southern) Sinhala-Dhivehi (Southern) (not shown: Kunar (Dardic), Chinali-Lahuli (Unclassified))

The Indo-Aryan languages (sometimes called Indic languages or Aryo-Indic languages) are a branch of the Indo-Iranian languages in the Indo-European language family. As of the early 21st century, there were 800 million speakers, primarily concentrated east of the Indus River in South Asia, spread across Eastern Pakistan, Northern India, southern Nepal, Bangladesh, Sri Lanka, and Maldives. Moreover, apart from the Indian subcontinent, large immigrant and expatriate Indo-Aryan–speaking communities live in Northwestern Europe, Western Asia, North America, the Caribbean, Southeast Africa, Polynesia and Australia, along with several million speakers of Romani languages primarily concentrated in Southeastern Europe. There are in the vicinity of 200 Indo-Aryan languages.

Proto-Indo-Aryan was very close to Vedic Sanskrit, though some of the later Prakrits retain features that had been lost from Vedic Sanskrit, showing that they had a separate descent from Proto-Indo-Aryan. The largest such languages in terms of first-speakers are Hindustani (Hindi/Urdu) (c. 330 million), Bengali (242 million), Punjabi (about 150 million), Marathi (112 million), and Gujarati (60 million). A 2005 estimate placed the total number of native speakers of the Indo-Aryan languages at nearly 900 million people. Other estimates are higher, suggesting a figure of 1.5 billion speakers of Indo-Aryan languages.

== Classification ==
=== Theories ===
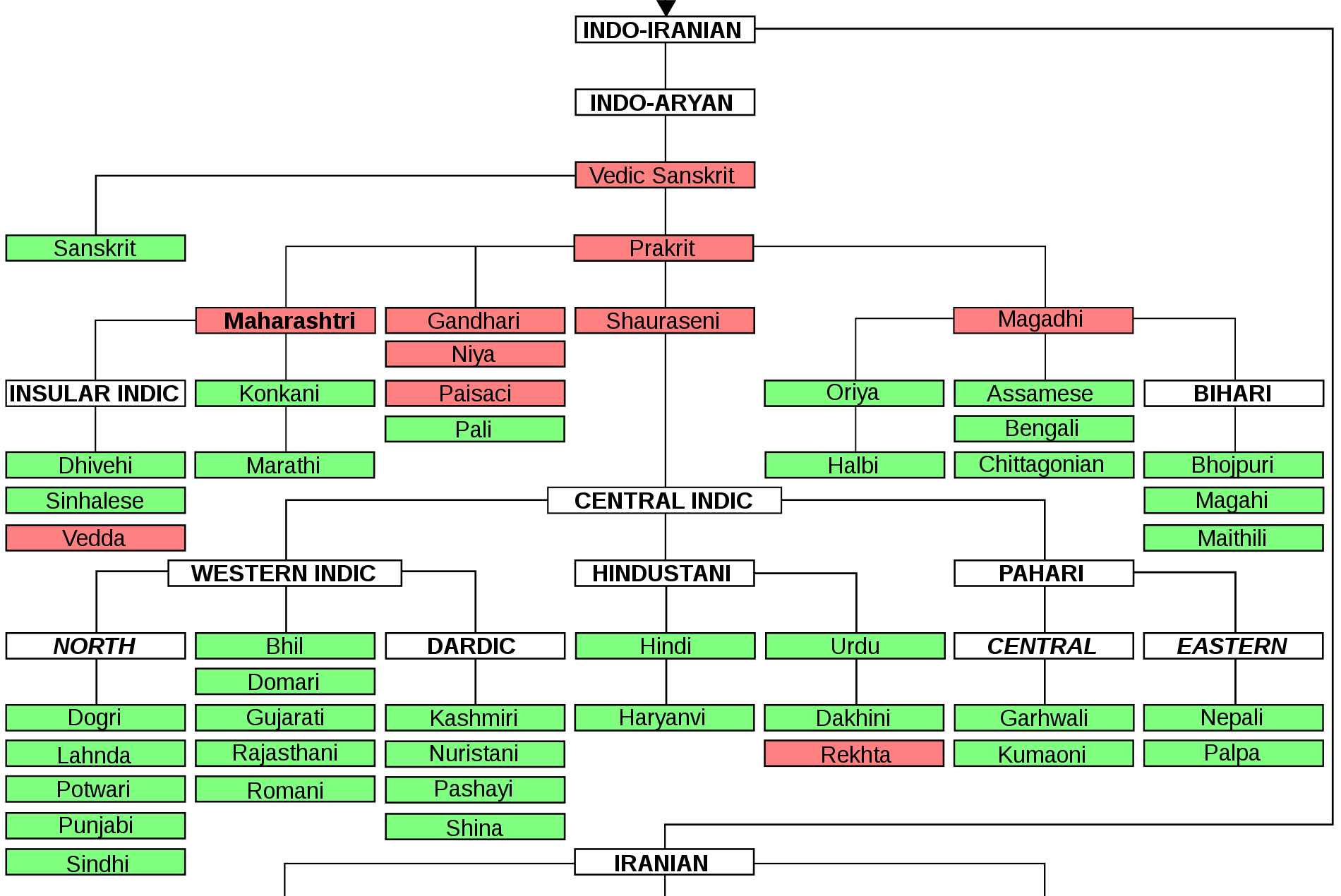
Classification tree of the Indo-Aryan languages

The Indo-Aryan family as a whole is thought to represent a dialect continuum, where languages are often transitional towards neighbouring varieties. Because of this, the division into languages vs. dialects is in many cases somewhat arbitrary. The classification of the Indo-Aryan languages is controversial, with many transitional areas that are assigned to different branches depending on classification. There are concerns that a tree model is insufficient for explaining the development of New Indo-Aryan, with some scholars suggesting the wave model.

==== Subgroups ====
The following table of proposals is expanded from Masica (1991) (from Hoernlé to Turner), and also includes subsequent classification proposals. The table lists only some modern Indo-Aryan languages.

Indo-Aryan subgroups
Model	Odia	Bengali– Assamese	Bihari	E. Hindi	W. Hindi	Rajasthani	Gujarati	Pahari	E. Punjabi	W. Punjabi	Sindhi	Dardic	Marathi– Konkani	Sinhala– Dhivehi	Romani
Hoernlé (1880)	E			E~W	W			N	W	?	W	?	S	?	?
Grierson (−1927)	E			C~E	C					NW		non-IA	S		non-IA
Chatterji (1926)	E				Midland	SW		N	NW			non-IA	S		NW
Grierson (1931)	E			Inter.	Midland	Inter.				NW		non-IA	S		non-IA
Katre (1968)	E			C						NW		Dardic	S		?
Nigam (1972)	E			C	C (+NW)	C		?	NW			N	S		?
Cardona (1974)	E		C				(S)W	NW					(S)W		?
Turner (−1975)	E		C				SW	C (C.)~NW (W.)	NW				SW		C
Kausen (2006)	E			C		W		N	NW			Dardic	S		Romani
Kogan (2016)	E		?	C	C~NW	NW		C~NW	C	NW		non-IA	S	Insular	C
Ethnologue (2020)	E			EC	C	W		EC (E.)~W (C., W.)	W		NW		S		W
Glottolog (2024)	E		Midland					N	NW			Dardic	S	Dhivehi-Sinhala	Midland

Anton I. Kogan, in 2016, conducted a lexicostatistical study of the New Indo-Aryan languages based on a 100-word Swadesh list, using techniques developed by the glottochronologist and comparative linguist Sergei Starostin. That grouping system is notable for Kogan's exclusion of Dardic from Indo-Aryan on the basis of his previous studies showing low lexical similarity to Indo-Aryan (43.5%) and negligible difference with similarity to Iranian (39.3%). He also calculated Sinhala–Dhivehi to be the most divergent Indo-Aryan branch. Nevertheless, the modern consensus of Indo-Aryan linguists tends towards the inclusion of Dardic based on morphological and grammatical features.

==== Inner–Outer hypothesis ====
The Inner–Outer hypothesis argues for a core and periphery of Indo-Aryan languages, with Outer Indo-Aryan (generally including Eastern and Southern Indo-Aryan, and sometimes Northwestern Indo-Aryan, Dardic and Pahari) representing an older stratum of Old Indo-Aryan that has been mixed to varying degrees with the newer stratum that is Inner Indo-Aryan. It is a contentious proposal with a long history, with varying degrees of claimed phonological and morphological evidence. Since its proposal by Rudolf Hoernlé in 1880 and refinement by George Grierson it has undergone numerous revisions and a great deal of debate, with the most recent iteration by Franklin Southworth and Claus Peter Zoller based on robust linguistic evidence (particularly an Outer past tense in -l-). Some of the theory's sceptics include Suniti Kumar Chatterji and Colin P. Masica.

=== Groups ===
The below classification follows Masica (1991), and Kausen (2006).

Percentage of Indo-Aryan speakers by native language:
1. Hindustani (Hindi/Urdu) (25.4%)
2. Bengali (20.7%)
3. Punjabi (9.40%)
4. Marathi (5.60%)
5. Gujarati (3.80%)
6. Bhojpuri (3.10%)
7. Maithili (2.60%)
8. Odia (2.50%)
9. Sindhi (1.90%)
10. Other (25.0%)

==== Dardic ====
The Dardic languages (also Dardu or Pisaca) are a group of Indo-Aryan languages largely spoken in the northwestern extremities of the Indian subcontinent. Dardic was first formulated by George Abraham Grierson in his Linguistic Survey of India but he did not consider it to be a subfamily of Indo-Aryan. The Dardic group as a genetic grouping (rather than areal) has been scrutinised and questioned to a degree by recent scholarship: Southworth, for example, says "the viability of Dardic as a genuine subgroup of Indo-Aryan is doubtful" and "the similarities among [Dardic languages] may result from subsequent convergence".

The Dardic languages are thought to be transitional with Punjabi and Pahari (e.g. Zoller describes Kashmiri as "an interlink between Dardic and West Pahāṛī"), as well as non-Indo-Aryan Nuristani; and are renowned for their relatively conservative features in the context of Proto-Indo-Aryan.

- Kashmiri: Kashmiri, Kishtwari, Pogali;
- Shina: Brokskad, Kundal Shahi, Shina, Ushoji, Kalkoti, Palula, Savi;
- Chitrali: Kalasha, Khowar;
- Kohistani: Bateri, Chilisso, Gowro, Indus Kohistani, Kalami, Tirahi, Torwali, Wotapuri-Katarqalai;
- Pashayi
- Kunar: Dameli, Gawar-Bati, Nangalami, Shumashti.

==== Northern Zone ====
The Northern Indo-Aryan languages, also known as the Pahari ('hill') languages, are spoken throughout the Himalayan regions of the subcontinent.

- Eastern Pahari: Nepali, Jumli, Doteli;
- Central Pahari: Garhwali, Kumaoni;
- Western Pahari: Dogri, Kangri, Bhadarwahi, Churahi, Bhateali, Bilaspuri, Chambeali, Gaddi, Pangwali, Mandeali, Mahasu Pahari, Jaunsari, Kullui, Pahari Kinnauri, Hinduri, Sarazi, Sirmauri.

==== Northwestern Zone ====
Northwestern Indo-Aryan languages are spoken in the northwestern region of India and eastern region of Pakistan. Punjabi is spoken predominantly in the Punjab region and is the official language of the northern Indian state of Punjab, in addition to being the most widely-spoken language in Pakistan. Sindhi and its variants are spoken natively in the Pakistani province of Sindh and neighbouring regions. Northwestern languages are ultimately thought to be descended from Paishachi Prakrit (some scholars still argue for Shaureshani as the antecedent), with influence from Persian and Arabic.

- Punjabi
  - Central: Majhi
  - Eastern: Doabi, Malwai, Puadhi
  - Western: Inku, Saraiki (Multani, Riasti, Derawali), Dhanni, Jhangvi, Shahpuri, Thali
  - North-Western: Hindko (Kohati, Ghebi, Awankari, Chachhi, Peshawari, Hazarvi), Pahari-Pothwari
- Sindhi: Sindhi, Jadgali, Kutchi, Luwati, Memoni, Khetrani, Kholosi.

==== Western Zone ====
Western Indo-Aryan languages are spoken in central and western India, in states such as Madhya Pradesh and Rajasthan, in addition to contiguous regions in Pakistan. Gujarati is the official language of Gujarat, and is spoken by over 50 million people. In Europe, various Romani languages are spoken by the Romani people, an itinerant community who historically migrated from India. The Western Indo-Aryan languages have diverged from their northwestern counterparts, the western languages' origin is frequently debated, whether they come from Abhiri-Saurastri Prakrit or Shauraseni Prakrit.

- Rajasthani: Bagri, Marwari, Mewati, Dhundari, Harauti, Mewari, Shekhawati, Dhatki, Malvi, Nimadi, Gujari, Goaria, Loarki, Bhoyari/Pawari, Kanjari, Od, Lambadi;
- Gujarati: Gujarati, Jandavra, Saurashtra, Aer, Vaghri, Parkari Koli, Kachi Koli, Wadiyara Koli;
- Bhil: Kalto, Vasavi, Wagdi, Gamit, Vaagri Booli;
  - Northern Bhil: Bauria, Bhilori, Magari;
  - Central Bhil: Bhili proper, Bhilali, Chodri, Dhodia, Dhanki, Dubli;
  - Bareli: Palya Bareli, Pauri Bareli, Rathwi Bareli, Pardhi;
- Khandeshi
- Domaaki
- Romani: Carpathian Romani, Balkan Romani, Vlax Romani, Baltic Romani;
  - Northern Romani
    - British Romani: Angloromani, Welsh Romani
    - Northwestern Romani: Sinte Romani, Finnish Kalo

==== Central Zone ====
Within India, Central Indo-Aryan languages are spoken primarily in the western Gangetic plains, including Delhi and parts of the Central Highlands, where they are often transitional with neighbouring lects. Many of these languages, including Braj and Awadhi, have rich literary and poetic traditions. Urdu, a Persianised derivative of Dehlavi descended from Shauraseni Prakrit, is the official language of Pakistan and also has strong historical connections to India, where it also has been designated with official status. Hindi, a standardised and Sanskritised register of Dehlavi, is the official language of the Government of India (along with English). Together with Urdu, it is the third most-spoken language in the world.

- Western Hindi: Hindustani (including Standard Hindi and Standard Urdu), Khariboli, Braj, Haryanvi, Bundeli, Kannauji;
  - To Western Hindi Ethnologue adds Sansi (Sansiboli), Chamari (a spurious language), Bhaya, Gowari (not a separate language), and Ghera;
- Eastern Hindi: Bagheli, Chhattisgarhi (Surgujia), Awadhi (Fiji Hindi, Caribbean Hindustani, Mauritian Bhojpuri);
- Domari;
- Seb Seliyer (or at least its ancestor) appear to be Central Zone languages that migrated to the Middle East and Europe ca. 500–1000 CE;
- Parya spoken in Gissar Valley in Tajikistan and Uzbekistan is considered a Central Zone language;

==== Eastern Zone ====
The Eastern Indo-Aryan languages, also known as Magadhan languages, are spoken throughout the eastern subcontinent, alongside other regions surrounding the northwestern Himalayan corridor. Bengali is the seventh most-spoken language in the world, and has a strong literary tradition; the national anthems of India and Bangladesh are written in Bengali. Assamese and Odia are the official languages of Assam and Odisha, respectively. The Eastern Indo-Aryan languages descend from Magadhan Apabhraṃśa and ultimately from Magadhi Prakrit. Eastern Indo-Aryan languages display many morphosyntactic features similar to those of Munda languages, which are largely absent in western Indo-Aryan languages. It is suggested that "proto-Munda" languages may have once dominated the eastern Indo-Gangetic Plain, and were then absorbed by Indo-Aryan languages at an early date as Indo-Aryan spread east.

- Bengali–Assamese
  - Bengali-Gauda: Bengali (Bangali, Rarhi, Sundarbani, Varendri, Manbhumi, Dhakaiya Kutti, Mymensinghi, Dobhashi), Noakhali, Chittagonian, Sylheti, Bishnupriya Manipuri, Hajong, Chakma, Tanchangya, Thar, Rohingya;
  - Kamarupic: Assamese (Eastern, Central, Kamrupi, Dehan, East Goalparia), Kamtapuri, Surjapuri, Rajbanshi;
- Bihari:
  - Bhojpuri, Caribbean Hindustani, Fiji Hindi, Mauritian Bhojpuri;
  - Magahi, Khortha;
  - Maithili, Angika, Bajjika, Thethi, Dehati;
  - Sadanic: Nagpuri, Kurmali (Panchpargania);
  - Tharu: Kochila Tharu, Rana Tharu, Kathariya Tharu, Sonha Tharu, Dangaura Tharu, Chitwania Buksa, Majhi, Musasa;
  - Kumhali, Kuswaric: Danwar, Bote-Darai;
- Halbic: Halbi, Kamar, Bhunjia, Nahari;
- Odia: Baleswari, Kataki, Ganjami, Sundargadi, Sambalpuri, Desia;
  - Bodo Parja, Bhatri, Reli, Kupia;

==== Southern Zone ====
Marathi-Konkani languages are ultimately descended from Maharashtri Prakrit, whereas Insular Indo-Aryan languages are descended from Elu Prakrit and possess several characteristics that markedly distinguish them from most of their mainland Indo-Aryan counterparts. Insular Indo-Aryan languages (of Sri Lanka and Maldives) started developing independently and diverging from the continental Indo-Aryan languages from around 5th century BCE.

- Marathi–Konkani
  - Marathic: Marathi, Varhadi, Andh, Agri, Zadi Boli, Thanjavur, Berar-Deccan Marathi, Phudagi, Judeo, Katkari, Varli, Kadodi;
  - Konkanic: Konkani, Karnataki Konkani, Maharashtrian Konkani.
- Insular Indo-Aryan (Sinhalese–Maldivian)
  - Sinhala (and creole Vedda)
  - Dhivehi (dialects include Malé and Addu)

==== Unclassified ====
The following languages are otherwise unclassified within Indo-Aryan:

- Chinali–Lahul Lohar: Chinali, Lahul Lohar.
- Bazigar
- Sheikhgal

== History ==
=== Indian subcontinent ===
Dates indicate only a rough time frame.

- Proto-Indo-Aryan (before 1500 BCE, reconstructed)
- Old Indo-Aryan (c. 1500–500 BCE)
  - early Old Indo-Aryan: includes Vedic Sanskrit (c. 1500 to 500 BCE)
  - late Old Indo-Aryan: Epic Sanskrit, Classical Sanskrit (c. 200 CE to 1300 CE)
  - Mitanni Indo-Aryan (c. 1400 BCE)
- Middle Indo-Aryan or Prakrits (c. 600 BCE to 1400 CE)
  - early Middle Indo-Aryan: e.g. early Jain and Buddhist texts (c. 6th or 5th century BCE), Ashokan Prakrits, Pali, Gandhari, (c. 600 BCE to 200 BCE)
  - middle Middle Indo-Aryan: e.g. Dramatic Prakrits, Elu (c. 300 BCE to 700 CE)
  - late Middle Indo-Aryan: e.g. Abahattha (c. 600 CE to 1400 CE)
- Early Modern Indo-Aryan (Late Medieval India): e.g. early Dakhini and emergence of the Dehlavi dialect

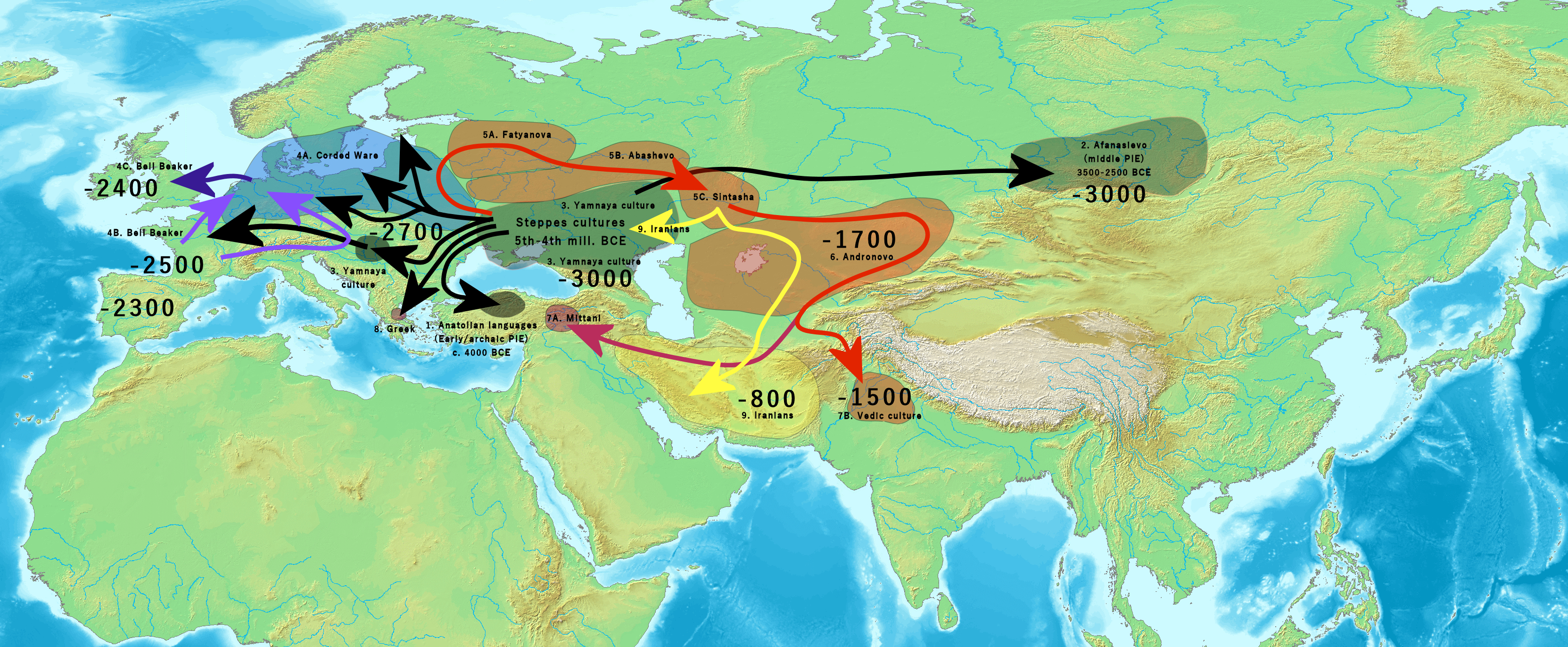
Early Indo-European migrations from the Pontic–Caspian steppe

==== Proto-Indo-Aryan ====
Proto-Indo-Aryan (or sometimes Proto-Indic) is the reconstructed proto-language of the Indo-Aryan languages. It is intended to reconstruct the language of the pre-Vedic Indo-Aryans. Proto-Indo-Aryan is meant to be the predecessor of Old Indo-Aryan (1500–300 BCE), which is directly attested as Vedic and Mitanni-Aryan. Despite the great archaicity of Vedic, however, the other Indo-Aryan languages preserve a small number of conservative features lost in Vedic.

==== Mitanni-Aryan hypothesis ====
Some theonyms, proper names, and other terminology of the Late Bronze Age Mitanni civilisation of Upper Mesopotamia exhibit an Indo-Aryan superstrate. While what few written records left by the Mittani are either in Hurrian (which appears to have been the predominant language of their kingdom) or Akkadian (the main diplomatic language of the Late Bronze Age Near East), these apparently Indo-Aryan names suggest that an Indo-Aryan elite imposed itself over the Hurrians in the course of the Indo-Aryan expansion. If these traces are Indo-Aryan, they would be the earliest known direct evidence of Indo-Aryan, and would increase the precision in dating the split between the Indo-Aryan and Iranian languages (as the texts in which the apparent Indicisms occur can be dated with some accuracy).

In a treaty between the Hittites and the Mitanni, the deities Mitra, Varuna, Indra, and the Ashvins (Nasatya) are invoked. Kikkuli's horse training text includes technical terms such as aika (cf. Sanskrit eka, "one"), tera (tri, "three"), panza (panca, "five"), satta (sapta, seven), na (nava, "nine"), vartana (vartana, "turn", round in the horse race). The numeral aika "one" is of particular importance because it places the superstrate in the vicinity of Indo-Aryan proper as opposed to Indo-Iranian in general or early Iranian (which has aiva). Another text has babru (babhru, "brown"), parita (palita, "grey"), and pinkara (pingala, "red"). Their chief festival was the celebration of the solstice (vishuva) which was common in most cultures in the ancient world. The Mitanni warriors were called marya, the term for "warrior" in Sanskrit as well; note mišta-nnu (= miẓḍha, ≈ Sanskrit mīḍha) "payment (for catching a fugitive)" (M. Mayrhofer, Etymologisches Wörterbuch des Altindoarischen, Heidelberg, 1986–2000; Vol. II:358).

Sanskritic interpretations of Mitanni royal names render Artashumara (artaššumara) as Ṛtasmara "who thinks of Ṛta" (Mayrhofer II 780), Biridashva (biridašṷa, biriiašṷa) as Prītāśva "whose horse is dear" (Mayrhofer II 182), Priyamazda (priiamazda) as Priyamedha "whose wisdom is dear" (Mayrhofer II 189, II378), Citrarata as Citraratha "whose chariot is shining" (Mayrhofer I 553), Indaruda/Endaruta as Indrota "helped by Indra" (Mayrhofer I 134), Shativaza (šattiṷaza) as Sātivāja "winning the race price" (Mayrhofer II 540, 696), Šubandhu as Subandhu "having good relatives" (a name in Palestine, Mayrhofer II 209, 735), Tushratta (tṷišeratta, tušratta, etc.) as *tṷaiašaratha, Vedic Tvastar "whose chariot is vehement" (Mayrhofer, Etym. Wb., I 686, I 736).

==== Old Indo-Aryan ====
The earliest evidence of the group is from Vedic Sanskrit, which is used in the ancient preserved texts of the Indian subcontinent, the foundational canon of the Hindu synthesis known as the Vedas. The Indo-Aryan superstrate in Mitanni is of similar age to the language of the Rigveda, but the only evidence of it is a few proper names and specialised loanwords.

While Old Indo-Aryan is the earliest stage of the Indo-Aryan branch, from which all known languages of the later stages Middle and New Indo-Aryan are derived, some documented Middle Indo-Aryan variants cannot fully be derived from the documented form of Old Indo-Aryan (on which Vedic and Classical Sanskrit are based), but betray features that must go back to other undocumented dialects of Old Indo-Aryan.

From Vedic Sanskrit, "Sanskrit" (literally 'put together, perfected, elaborated') developed as the prestige language of culture, science and religion, as well as the court, theatre, etc. Sanskrit of the later Vedic texts is comparable to Classical Sanskrit, but is largely considered mutually unintelligible with Vedic Sanskrit.

Broadly, Classical Sanskrit is seen as the Eastern dialect spoken by Rigvedic Tribes and later polities of the Heartlands. While sister dialects in east were more influenced by non-Indo-Aryanic groups and were not preserved like that of Kuru-Pancala-Gandhara dialect (Classical Sanskrit) and gradually evolved in Pali and other prakrits. For example; Pali retains the retroflex consonents "ळ" and "ळ्ह"of Vedic Language, while Sanskrit replaces them with "ड" and "ढ". And also the instrumental plural forms of "भिस् (bhis)" in masculine, which Classical Sanskrit replaces with "ऐस् (ais)"

==== Middle Indo-Aryan (Prakrits) ====
Outside the learned sphere of Sanskrit, vernacular dialects (Prakrits) continued to evolve. The oldest attested Prakrits are the Buddhist and Jain canonical languages Pali and Ardhamagadhi Prakrit, respectively. Inscriptions in Ashokan Prakrit were also part of this early Middle Indo-Aryan stage, developing into Gandhari Prakrit and Monumental Prakrit.

By medieval times, the Prakrits had diversified into various Middle Indo-Aryan languages. Apabhraṃśa is the conventional cover term for transitional dialects connecting late Middle Indo-Aryan with early modern Indo-Aryan, spanning roughly the 6th to 13th centuries. Some of these dialects showed considerable literary production; the Śravakacāra of Devasena (dated to the 930s) is now considered to be the first book written in Hindi.

The next major milestone occurred with the Muslim conquests in the Indian subcontinent in the 13th–16th centuries. Under the flourishing Turco-Mongol Mughal Empire, Persian became very influential as the language of prestige of the Islamic courts due to adoption of the foreign language by the Mughal emperors.

The largest languages that formed from Apabhraṃśa were Bengali, Bhojpuri, Hindustani, Assamese, Sindhi, Gujarati, Odia, Marathi, and Punjabi.

==== New Indo-Aryan ====
===== Medieval Hindustani =====
In the Central Zone Hindi-speaking areas, for a long time the prestige dialect was Braj Bhasha, but this was replaced in the 13th century by Dehlavi-based Hindustani. Hindustani was strongly influenced by Persian, with these and later Sanskrit influence leading to the emergence of Modern Standard Hindi and Modern Standard Urdu as registers of the Hindustani language. This state of affairs continued until the division of the British Indian Empire in 1947, when Modern Standard Hindi became the official language in India and Modern Standard Urdu became official in Pakistan. Despite the different script the fundamental grammar remains identical, the difference is more sociolinguistic than purely linguistic. Today it is widely understood/spoken as a second or third language throughout South Asia and one of the most widely known languages in the world in terms of number of speakers.

=== Outside the Indian subcontinent ===
==== Domari ====
Domari is an Indo-Aryan language spoken by older Dom people scattered across the Middle East. The language is reported to be spoken as far north as Azerbaijan and as far south as central Sudan. Based on the systematicity of sound changes, linguists have concluded that the ethnonyms Domari and Romani derive from the Indo-Aryan word ḍom.

==== Lomavren ====
Lomavren is a nearly extinct mixed language, spoken by the Lom people, that arose from language contact between a language related to Romani and Domari and the Armenian language.

==== Parya ====
Parya is spoken in Tajikistan and Uzbekistan by the descendants of migrants from the Indian subcontinent. The language retains many features similar to Punjabi and the Western Hindi dialects, while also bearing some influence from Tajik Persian.

==== Romani ====
The Romani language is usually included in the Western Indo-Aryan languages. Romani varieties, which are mainly spoken throughout Europe, are noted for their relatively conservative nature; maintaining the Middle Indo-Aryan present-tense person concord markers, alongside consonantal endings for nominal case. Indeed, these features are no longer evident in most other modern Central Indo-Aryan languages. Moreover, Romani shares an innovative pattern of past-tense person, which corresponds to Dardic languages, such as Kashmiri and Shina. This is believed to be further indication that proto-Romani speakers were originally situated in central regions of the subcontinent, before migrating to northwestern regions. However, there are no known historical sources regarding the development of the Romani language specifically within India.

Research conducted by nineteenth-century scholars Pott (1845) and Miklosich (1882–1888) demonstrated that the Romani language is most aptly designated as a New Indo-Aryan language (NIA), as opposed to Middle Indo-Aryan (MIA); establishing that proto-Romani speakers could not have left India significantly earlier than 1000 CE.

The principal argument favouring a migration during or after the transition period to NIA is the loss of the old system of nominal case, coupled with its reduction to a two-way nominative-oblique case system. A secondary argument concerns the system of gender differentiation, due to the fact that Romani has only two genders (masculine and feminine). Middle Indo-Aryan languages (named MIA) generally employed three genders (masculine, feminine and neuter), and some modern Indo-Aryan languages retain this aspect today.

It is suggested that loss of the neuter gender did not occur until the transition to NIA. During this process, most of the neuter nouns became masculine, while several became feminine. For example, the neuter aggi "fire" in Prakrit morphed into the feminine āg in Hindustani, and jag in Romani. The parallels in grammatical gender evolution between Romani and other NIA languages have additionally been cited as indications that the forerunner of Romani remained on the Indian subcontinent until a later period, possibly as late as the tenth century.

==== Sindhic migrations ====
Kholosi, Jadgali, Luwati, Maimani and Al Sayigh represent offshoots of the Sindhic subfamily of Indo-Aryan that have established themselves in the Persian Gulf region, perhaps through sea-based migrations. These are of a later origin than the Rom and Dom migrations which represent a different part of Indo-Aryan as well.

==== Indentured labourer migrations ====
The use by the British East India Company, and later the British Raj, of indentured labourers led to the transplanting of Indo-Aryan languages around the world, leading to locally influenced lects that diverged from the source language, such as Fiji Hindi, Mauritian Bhojpuri, and Caribbean Hindustani (incl. Sarnami Hindustani).

== Phonology ==
=== Consonants ===
==== Stop positions ====
The normative system of New Indo-Aryan stops consists of five places of articulation: labial, dental, "retroflex", palatal, and velar, which is the same as that of Sanskrit. The "retroflex" position may involve retroflexion, or curling the tongue to make the contact with the underside of the tip, or merely retraction. The point of contact may be alveolar or postalveolar, and the distinctive quality may arise more from the shaping than from the position of the tongue. Palatal stops have affricated release and are traditionally included as involving a distinctive tongue position (blade in contact with hard palate). Widely transcribed as [tʃ], Masica (1991:94) claims [cʃ] to be a more accurate rendering.

Moving away from the normative system, some languages and dialects have alveolar affricates [ts] instead of palatal, though some among them retain [tʃ] in certain positions: before front vowels (esp. /i/), before /j/, or when geminated. Alveolar as an additional point of articulation occurs in Marathi and Konkani where dialect mixture and others factors upset the aforementioned complementation to produce minimal environments, in some West Pahari dialects through internal developments (*t̪ɾ, t̪ > /tʃ/), and in Kashmiri. The addition of a retroflex affricate to this in some Dardic languages maxes out the number of stop positions at seven (barring borrowed /q/), while a reduction to the inventory involves *ts > /s/, which has happened in Assamese, Chittagonian, Sinhala (though there have been other sources of a secondary /ts/), and Southern Mewari.

Further reductions in the number of stop articulations are in Assamese and Romani, which have lost the characteristic dental/retroflex contrast, and in Chittagonian, which may lose its labial and velar articulations through spirantisation in many positions (> [f, x]). /q x ɣ f/ are restricted to Perso-Arabic loanwords in most IA languages but they occur natively in Khowar. According to Masica (1991) some dialects of Pashayi have a /θ/ which is unusual for IA languages. Domari which is spoken in the Middle East and had high contact with Middle Eastern languages has /q ħ ʕ ʔ/ and emphatic consonants from loanwords.

Stops								Languages
/p/	/t̪/	/ʈ/ ~ /t/	/ʈ͡ʂ/	/t͡ʃ/ ~ /t͡ɕ/	/t͡s/	/k/	/q/	Languages
Yes	Yes	Yes	Yes	Yes	Yes	Yes	Yes	Khowar, Shina, Bashkarik, Kalasha
Yes	Yes	Yes	Yes	Yes	Yes	Yes	No	Gawarbati, Phalura, Shumashti, Kanyawali, Pashai
Yes	Yes	Yes	No	Yes	Yes	Yes	No	Marathi, Konkani, certain W. Pahari dialects (Bhadrawahi, Bhalesi, Mandeali, Padari, Simla, Satlej, maybe Kulu), Kashmiri, E. and N. dialects of Bengali (parts of Dhaka, Mymensingh, Rajshahi)
Yes	Yes	Yes	No	Yes	No	Yes	No	Hindustani, Punjabi, Dogri, Sindhi, Gujarati, Sinhala, Odia, Standard Bengali, dialects of Rajasthani (except Lamani, NW. Marwari, S. Mewari), Sanskrit, Prakrit, Pali, Maithili, Magahi, Bhojpuri
Yes	No	Yes	No	Yes	No	Yes	No	Romani, Domari, Kholosi
Yes	Yes	Yes	No	No	Yes	Yes	No	Nepali, dialects of Rajasthani (Lamani and NW. Marwari), Northern Lahnda's Kagani, Kumauni, many West Pahari dialects (not Chamba Mandeali, Jaunsari, or Sirmauri)
Yes	Yes	Yes	No	No	No	Yes	No	Rajasthani's S. Mewari
Yes	No	Yes	No	No	No	Yes	Yes	Assamese
No	Yes	Yes	No	No	No	Yes	No	Chittagonian
No	Yes	Yes	No	No	No	No	No	Sylheti

==== Nasals ====
Sanskrit was noted as having five nasal-stop articulations corresponding to its oral stops, with the palatal and velar nasals only appearing in homorganic clusters.

Among modern Indo-Aryan languages, Dogri, Kacchi, Kalasha, Rudhari, Shina, Saurashtri, and Sindhi have been analysed as having this full set of phonemic nasals /m/ /n/ /ɳ/ /ɲ/ /ŋ/, with the last two generally as the result of the loss of the stop from a homorganic nasal + stop cluster ([ɲj] > [ɲ] and [ŋɡ] > [ŋ]), though there are other sources as well.

In languages that lack phonemic nasals at some places of articulation, they can still occur allophonically from place assimilation in a nasal + stop cluster, e.g. Hindustani /nɡ/ > [ŋɡ]. Furthermore, some nasals are restricted to certain positions as a merger of several sounds, e.g. [ŋ] being the realization of any nasal in final position in Sinhala and Dhivehi. These allophonic and derived examples are not included in the following table.

Nasals					Languages
/m/	/n/	/ɳ/	/ɲ/	/ŋ/	Languages
Yes	Yes	Yes	Yes	Yes	Dogri, Kacchi, Kalasha, Rudhari, Shina, Saurashtri, Sindhi, Saraiki
Yes	Yes	Yes	No	Yes	Kalami, Odia, Dhundhari, Pashayi, Marwari, Nepali
Yes	Yes	Yes	Yes	No	Addu Dhivehi
Yes	Yes	No	Yes	No	Sinhala, Malé Dhivehi (Note: Unclear status of /ɲ/)
Yes	Yes	Yes	No	No	Gujarati, Kashmiri, Marathi, Punjabi, Marwari, Hindi
Yes	Yes	No	No	Yes	Sylheti, Assamese, Bengali
Yes	Yes	No	No	No	Urdu, Romani, Domari

==== Aspiration and breathy-voice ====
Most Indo-Aryan languages have contrastive aspiration (/ʈ/ ~ /ʈʰ/), and several retain historical breathy voice on voiced consonants (/ɖ/ ~ /ɖʱ/). Sometimes both phenomena are analysed as a single aspiration contrast. The places and manners of articulation which allow contrastive aspiration vary by language; e.g. Sindhi permits phonemic /mʱ/, but the phonemic status of this sound in Hindustani is uncertain, and many "Dardic" languages lack aspirated retroflex sibilants despite having unaspirated equivalents.

In languages that have lost breathy-voice, the contrast has sometimes been replaced with tone.

==== Regional developments ====
Some of these are mentioned in Masica (1991:104–105).

- Implosives: Languages in the Sindhic subfamily, as well as Saraiki, western Marwari dialects, and some dialects of Gujarati have developed implosive consonants from historical intervocalic geminates and word-initial stops. Sindhi has a full implosive series except for the dental implosive: /ɠ ʄ ᶑ ɓ/. It has been claimed that Wadiyari Koli has the dental implosive too. Other languages have less complete implosive series, e.g. Kacchi has just /ᶑ ɓ/.
- Prenasalized stops: Sinhala and Maldivian (Dhivehi) have a series of prenasalised stops covering all places except for palatal: /ᵐb ⁿd ᶯɖ ᵑɡ/.
- Palatalization: Kashmiri (natively) and some Romani dialects (from contact with Slavic languages) have contrastive palatalisation.
- Voiceless lateral In Gawarbati, some Pashai dialects, partly Bashkarik and some Shina dialects have /ɬ/ from clusters of tr kr or sometimes pr; dr gr and br merged with /l/ in these languages.
- Lateral affricates: Bhadarwahi has an unusual series of lateral retroflex affricates (/ʈ͡ꞎ ɖ͡ɭ ɖ͡ɭʱ/ derived from historical /Cɾ/ clusters.

=== Vowels ===
Vowel typologies are varied across Indo-Aryan due to diachronic mergers and (in some cases) splits, as well as different accounts by linguists for even the widely-spoken languages. Vowel systems per Masica (1991:108–113) are listed below. Many languages also have phonemic nasal vowels.

	Vowels	Languages
16	/iː i eː e ɨː ɨ əː ə aː a ɔː ɔ oː o uː u/	Kashmiri
14	/ɪ iː ʊ uː e eː ə~ɐ əː o oː æ~ɛ a aː ɔ/	Maithili
13	/iː i eː e æː æ aː a ə oː o uː u/	Sinhala
10	/i ɪ e ɛ · a ə · ɔ o ʊ u/	Hindustani, Punjabi, Sindhi, Kacchi, Hindko, Rajasthani (most varieties)
9	/i ɪ e æ~ɛ · a ə · o ʊ u/	W. Pahari (Dogri, Rudhari, Mandeali, Pangwali, Khashali, Churahi), Saraiki
9	/i ɪ e · a ə · ɔ o ʊ u/	W. Pahari (Shodochi, Surkhuli)
9	/i ɪ e ɛ · a · ɔ o ʊ u/	W. Pahari (Jaunsari, Shoracholi, Kullui)
8	/i e ɛ · a ə · ɔ o u/	Gujarati
8	/i e ɛ a · ɒ ɔ o u/	Assamese
8	/i ɪ e · a ə · o ʊ u/	Halbi, Bhatri, W. Pahari (Garhwali, Chameali, Gaddi)
7	/i e æ · a · ɔ o u/	Bengali
6	/i e a · ɔ o u/	Odia, Bishnupriya Manipuri
6	/i e · a ə · o u/	Marathi, Lambadi, Sadri/Sadani
6	/i e · a ʌ · o u/	Nepali
5	/i e · a · o u/	Romani (European dialects)

Sylheti language is one of the few tonal Indo-Aryan languages, others being Punjabi and a few Dardic languages. The vowels of Sylheti language listed below.

	Vowels	Languages
5	/i ɛ · a · ɔ u/	Sylheti

=== Consonants ===
The following are consonant systems of major and representative New Indo-Aryan languages, mostly following Masica (1991:106–107), though here they are in IPA. Parentheses indicate those consonants found only in loanwords: square brackets indicate those with "very low functional load". The arrangement is roughly geographical.

Romani
p	t	(ts)	tʃ	k	pʲ	tʲ	kʲ
b	d	(dz)	dʒ	ɡ	bʲ	dʲ	ɡʲ
pʰ	tʰ		tʃʰ	kʰ
m	n					nʲ
(f)	s		ʃ	x	(fʲ)	sʲ
v	(z)		ʒ	ɦ	vʲ	zʲ
	ɾ	l				lʲ
			j

Shina
p	t̪	ʈ	ts	tʃ	tʂ	k
b	d	ɖ		dʒ	ɖʐ	ɡ
pʰ	t̪ʰ	ʈʰ	tsʰ	tʃʰ	tʂʰ	kʰ
m	n	ɳ		ɲ		ŋ
(f)	s	ʂ		ɕ
	z	ʐ		ʑ		ɦ
	ɾ l	ɽ
w				j

Kashmiri
p	t̪	ʈ	ts	tʃ	k	pʲ	t̪ʲ	ʈʲ	tsʲ	kʲ
b	d̪	ɖ		dʒ	ɡ	bʲ	d̪ʲ	ɖʲ		ɡʲ
pʰ	t̪ʰ	ʈʰ	tsʰ	tʃʰ	kʰ	pʲʰ	t̪ʲʰ	ʈʲʰ	tsʲʰ	kʲʰ
m	n			ɲ		mʲ	nʲ
	s			ʃ			sʲ
	z				ɦ		zʲ			ɦʲ
	ɾ l						ɾʲ lʲ
w				j		wʲ

Saraiki
p	t̪	ʈ	tʃ	k
b	d̪	ɖ	dʒ	ɡ
pʰ	t̪ʰ	ʈʰ	tʃʰ	kʰ
bʱ	d̪ʱ	ɖʱ	dʒʱ	ɡʱ
ɓ		ɗ	ʄ	ɠ
m	n	ɳ	ɲ	ŋ
mʱ	nʱ	ɳʱ
	s		(ʃ)	(x)
	(z)			(ɣ) ɦ
	ɾ l	ɽ
	ɾʱ lʱ	ɽʱ
w			j
wʱ

Punjabi
p	t̪	ʈ	tʃ	k
b	d̪	ɖ	dʒ	ɡ
pʼ	t̪ʼ	ʈʼ	tʃʼ	kʼ
m	n	ɳ	ɲ	ŋ
(f)	s		ʃ
	(z)			ɦ
	ɾ l	ɽ ɭ
[w]			[j]

Nepali
p	t̪	ʈ	ts	k
b	d̪	ɖ	dz	ɡ
pʰ	t̪ʰ	ʈʰ	tsʰ	kʰ
bʱ	d̪ʱ	ɖʱ	dzʱ	ɡʱ
m	n			ŋ
	s				ɦ
	ɾ l
[w]			[j]

Sylheti
	t̪	ʈ
b	d̪	ɖ		ɡ
m	n			ŋ
ɸ	s		ʃ	x
	z			ɦ
	r l

Sindhi
p	t̪	ʈ	tʃ	k
b	d̪	ɖ	dʒ	ɡ
pʰ	t̪ʰ	ʈʰ	tʃʰ	kʰ
bʱ	d̪ʱ	ɖʱ	dʒʱ	ɡʱ
ɓ		ɗ	ʄ	ɠ
m	n	ɳ	ɲ	ŋ
mʱ	nʱ	ɳʱ
(f)	s		(ʃ)	(x)
	(z)			(ɣ) ɦ
		ɾ l	ɽ
		ɾʱ lʱ	ɽʱ
w			j
wʱ

Marwari
p	t̪	ʈ	tʃ	k
b	d̪	ɖ	dʒ	ɡ
pʰ	t̪ʰ	ʈʰ	tʃʰ	kʰ
bʱ	d̪ʱ	ɖʱ	dʒʱ	ɡʱ
ɓ	ɗ̪	ɗ		ɠ
m	n	ɳ
mʱ	nʱ
	s			ɦ
	ɾ l	ɽ ɭ
w			j
wʱ

Hindustani
p
t̪
ʈ
tʃ
(q)
k
b
d̪
ɖ
dʒ
(ɣ)
ɡ
pʰ
t̪ʰ
ʈʰ
tʃʰ
(x)
kʰ
bʱ
d̪ʱ
ɖʱ
dʒʱ

ɡʱ
m
n
(ɳ)

(f)
s
(ʂ)
ʃ
(ʒ)

(z)

ɦ

[r] ɾ l
ɽ

ɽʱ

ʋ

[w]

j

Assamese
p	t	k
b	d	g
pʰ	tʰ	kʰ
bʱ	dʱ	ɡʱ
m	n	ŋ
	s	x
	z	ɦ
	ɹ l
[w]

Bengali
p	t̪	ʈ	tʃ	k
b	d̪	ɖ	dʒ	ɡ
pʰ	t̪ʰ	ʈʰ	tʃʰ	kʰ
bʱ	d̪ʱ	ɖʱ	dʒʱ	ɡʱ
m	n			ŋ
	[s]		ʃ	ɦ
	[z]
	ɾ l	ɽ
		[ɽʱ]
			[j]

Gujarati
p	t̪	ʈ	tʃ	k
b	d̪	ɖ	dʒ	ɡ
pʰ	t̪ʰ	ʈʰ	tʃʰ	kʰ
bʱ	d̪ʱ	ɖʱ	dʒʱ	ɡʱ
m	n	ɳ
mʱ	nʱ	ɳʱ
	s		ʃ	ɦ
	ɾ l	ɭ
	ɾʱ lʱ
w			j

Marathi
p	t̪	ʈ	ts	tʃ	k
b	d̪	ɖ	dz	dʒ	ɡ
pʰ	t̪ʰ	ʈʰ		tʃʰ	kʰ
bʱ	d̪ʱ	ɖʱ	dzʱ	dʒʱ	ɡʱ
m	n	ɳ
mʱ	nʱ	ɳʱ
	s			ʃ	ɦ
	ɾ l	ɭ
	ɾʱ lʱ
w			j
wʱ

Odia
p	t̪	ʈ	tʃ	k
b	d̪	ɖ	dʒ	ɡ
pʰ	t̪ʰ	ʈʰ	tʃʰ	kʰ
bʱ	d̪ʱ	ɖʱ	dʒʱ	ɡʱ
m	n	ɳ
	s			ɦ
	ɾ l	[ɽ] ɭ
		[ɽʱ]
[w]			[j]

Sinhala
p	t̪	ʈ	tʃ	k
b	d̪	ɖ	dʒ	ɡ
ᵐb	ⁿ̪d	ᶯɖ		ᵑɡ
m	n		ɲ	ŋ
	s			ɦ
	ɾ l
w			j

== Sociolinguistics ==
=== Register ===
In many Indo-Aryan languages, the literary register is often more archaic and utilises a different lexicon (Sanskrit or Perso-Arabic) than spoken vernacular. One example is Bengali's high literary form, Sādhū bhāṣā, as opposed to the more modern Calita bhāṣā (Cholito-bhasha). This distinction approaches diglossia.

=== Language and dialect ===
In the context of South Asia, the choice between the appellations "language" and "dialect" is a difficult one, and any distinction made using these terms is obscured by their ambiguity. In one general colloquial sense, a language is a "developed" dialect: one that is standardised, has a written tradition and enjoys social prestige. As there are degrees of development, the boundary between a language and a dialect thus defined is not clear-cut, and there is a large middle ground where assignment is contestable. There is a second meaning of these terms, in which the distinction is drawn on the basis of linguistic similarity. Though seemingly a "proper" linguistics sense of the terms, it is still problematic: methods that have been proposed for quantifying difference (for example, based on mutual intelligibility) have not been seriously applied in practice; and any relationship established in this framework is relative.

== See also ==
- Indo-Aryans
- Iranic languages
- Proto-Vedic Continuity
- The family of Brahmic scripts
- Indo-Aryan loanwords in Tamil
- Dravidian languages
- Languages of Bangladesh
- Languages of India
- Languages of Maldives
- Languages of Nepal
- Languages of Pakistan
- Languages of Sri Lanka
- Languages of South Asia
