= Hindustani phonology =

Phonology of Hindi and Urdu

Hindustani is the lingua franca of northern India and Pakistan, and through its two standardized registers, Hindi and Urdu, a co-official language of India and co-official and national language of Pakistan respectively. Phonological differences between the two standards are minimal.

== Vowels ==
The oral vowel phonemes of Hindi according to Ohala (1999:102)

Hindustani vowel phonemes
	Front	Central	Back
Close	iː		uː
Near-close	ɪ		ʊ
Close-mid	eː	ə	oː
Open-mid	ɛː	ə	ɔː
Open	(æː)	ɑː	

Hindustani natively possesses a symmetrical ten-vowel system. The vowels /ə ɪ ʊ/ are always short in length, while all others are usually considered long, in addition to an eleventh vowel /æː/ which is found in English loanwords. The distinction between short and long vowels is often described as tenseness, with short vowels being lax, and long vowels being tense. Vowels are somewhat longer before voiced stops than before voiceless stops. Additionally, [ɛ] and [ɔ] occur as conditional allophones of /ə/.

=== Vowel [ə] ===
/ə/ is often realized more open than mid [ə], i.e. as near-open [ɐ]. It is subject to schwa deletion word-medially in certain contexts.

=== Vowel [aː] ===
The open central vowel is transcribed in IPA by either [aː] or [ɑː].

In Urdu, there is further short [a] (spelled ہ, as in کمرہ kamra [kəmra]) in word-final position, which contrasts with [aː] (spelled ا, as in لڑکا laṛkā [ləɽkaː]). This contrast is often not realized by Urdu speakers, and always neutralized in Hindi (where both sounds uniformly correspond to [aː]).

=== Vowels [ɪ], [ʊ], [iː], [uː] ===
Among the close vowels, what in Sanskrit are thought to have been primarily distinctions of vowel length (that is /i, iː/ and /u, uː/), have become in Hindustani distinctions of quality, or length accompanied by quality (that is, /ɪ, iː/ and /ʊ, uː/). The opposition of length in the close vowels has been neutralized in word-final position, only allowing long close vowels in final position. As a result, Sanskrit loans which originally have a short close vowel are realized with a long close vowel, e.g. śakti (शक्ति – شکتی 'energy') and vastu (वस्तु – وستو 'item') are [ʃəktiː] and [ʋəstuː], usually not *[ʃəktɪ] and *[ʋəstʊ].

=== Vowels [ɛ], [ɛː] ===
The vowel represented graphically as ऐ – اَے (romanized as ai) has been variously transcribed as [ɛː] or [æː]. Among sources for this article,, pictured to the right, uses [ɛː], while and use [æː]. Furthermore, an eleventh vowel /æː/ is found in English loanwords, such as /bæːʈ/ ('bat'). Hereafter, ऐ – اَے (romanized as ai) will be represented as [ɛː] to distinguish it from /æː/ (which uses ऍ), the latter.

In addition, [ɛ] occurs as a conditioned allophone of /ə/ (schwa) within the sequence /əɦə/ (/əɦ/ before the next syllable or word-finally due to schwa deletion). This change is part of the prestige dialect of Delhi and Western Hindi languages, though it does not occur for every speaker (nor for those of Eastern Hindi languages). Here are some examples of this process:

Hindi/Urdu	Transliteration	Phonemic	Phonetic
कहना / کہنا "to say"	kahnā	/kəɦ.nɑː/	[kɛɦ.nɑː]
शहर / شہر "city"	śahar	/ʃə.ɦəɾ/	[ʃɛ.ɦɛɾ]
ठहरना / ٹھہرنا "to wait"	ṭhaharnā	/ʈʰə.ɦəɾ.nɑː/	[ʈʰɛ.ɦɛɾ.nɑː]

However, the fronting of schwa does not occur in words with a schwa only on one side of the /ɦ/ such as kahānī /kəɦaːniː/ (कहानी – کہانی 'a story') or bāhar /baːɦər/ (बाहर – باہر 'outside').

=== Vowels [ɔ], [ɔː] ===
The vowel [ɔ] occurs in proximity to /ɦ/ if the /ɦ/ is surrounded on one of the sides by a schwa and on other side by a round vowel (due to Hindustani phonotactics, this generally only occurs in the sequences /əɦʊ/ or /ʊɦə/, and that too in the prestigious dialect of Delhi and Western Hindi languages; though it does not occur for every speaker, nor for those of Eastern Hindi languages). It differs from the vowel [ɔː] in that it is a short vowel. For example, in bahut /bəɦʊt/ the /ɦ/ is surrounded on one side by a schwa and a round vowel on the other side. One or both of the vowels will become [ɔ], giving the pronunciation [bɔɦɔt].

=== Nasalisation of vowels ===
As in French and Portuguese, there are nasalised vowels in Hindustani. There is disagreement over the issue of the nature of nasalisation (barring English-loaned /æ/ which is seldom nasalised). presents four differing viewpoints:

1. there are no *[ẽː] and *[õː], possibly because of the effect of nasalization on vowel quality;
2. there is phonemic nasalization of all vowels;
3. all vowel nasalization is predictable (i.e. allophonic);
4. Nasalized long vowel phonemes (/ɑ̃ː ĩː ũː ẽː ɛ̃ː õː ɔ̃ː/) occur word-finally and before voiceless stops; instances of nasalized short vowels ([ə̃ ɪ̃ ʊ̃]) and of nasalized long vowels before voiced stops (the latter, presumably because of a deleted nasal consonant) are allophonic.

Masica supports this last view.

=== Vowel orthography with diacritics and English approximations ===
The principal vowel phonemes may be organised as follows to demonstrate the orthographic conventions for vowels.

Vowels
IPA	Hindi		ISO 15919	Urdu (Note: Diacritics in Urdu are normally not written and usually implied and interpreted based on the context of the sentence)			Approximate English equivalent
IPA	Initial	Combining	ISO 15919	Final	Medial	Initial	Approximate English equivalent
ə	अ	(Note: Hindi does not have a diacritic to represent /ə/ as it is the inherent vowel of the Devanagari script. However, there does exist a diacritic, ्, for suppressing /ə/, though it is not often used or needed in modern Hindi orthography.)	a	ـہ	ـ◌َـ	اَ	about
aː	आ	ा	ā	◌َا		آ	far
ɪ	इ	ि	i	◌ِی	ـ◌ِـ	اِ	still
iː	ई	ी	ī	◌ِی	◌ِـیـ	اِیـ	fee
ʊ	उ	ु	u	◌ُو	ـ◌ُـ	اُ	book
uː	ऊ	ू	ū	◌ُو		اُو	moon
eː	ए	े	ē	ے	ـیـ	ایـ	mate
ɛː	ऐ	ै	ai	◌َـے	◌َـیـ	اَیـ	fairy
oː	ओ	ो	ō	◌و		او	force
ɔː	औ	ौ	au	◌َـو		اَو	thought
ʰ	(Note: Hindi has individual letters for each of the aspirated consonants, whereas Urdu has a specific letter to represent aspiration after any consonant)		h	ھ			aspiration of the preceding consonant, as in cake
◌̃	(Note: As this is a diacritic affecting the preceding vowel, it cannot be the initial character of a word.)	ँ	m̐	ں	ـن٘ـ	(Note: In Urdu, the initial form (letter) for representing a nasalised word is: ن٘ (nūn + small nūn ġuṇnā diacritic))	heavy nasalisation of the preceding vowel, like can't in rapid General American English
(Note: As this symbol can represent any nasal consonant phoneme depending on which consonant it is followed by, the particular IPA character used to represent this sound depends on the context.)	(Note: This character does not have an initial form and is not used for initial nasals in Hindi)	ं	ṁ	ں	ـن٘ـ	(Note: In Urdu, the initial form (letter) for representing a nasalised word is: ن٘ (nūn + small nūn ġuṇnā diacritic))	homorganic nasal before the succeeding consonant, like jungle or branch, and light vowel nasalisation

== Consonants ==
Hindustani stops (Note: Derived: Phonetics from UCLA.edu but re-recorded.)
Bilabial stops
पाल/پال, फाल/پھال, बाल/بال, भाल/بھال
pāl phāl bāl bhāl
[paːl pʰaːl baːl bʱaːl]
'take care of, knife blade, hair, forehead'

Dental stops
ताल/تال, थाल/تھال, दाल/دال, धार/دھار
tāl thāl dāl dhār
[t̪aːl t̪ʰaːl d̪aːl d̪ʱaːɾ]
'rhythm, plate, lentil, sharpness'

Retroflex stops
टाल/ٹال, ठाल/ٹھال, डाल/ڈال, ढाल/ڈھال
ṭāl ṭhāl ḍāl ḍhāl
[ʈaːl ʈʰaːl ɖaːl ɖʱaːl]
'postpone, wood shop, branch, shield'

Palatal stops
चल/چل, छल/چھل, जल/جل, झल/جھل
cal chal jal jhal
[tʃəl tʃʰəl dʒəl dʒʱəl]
'walk, deceit, water, glimmer'

Velar stops
कान/کان, खान/کھان, गान/گان, घान/گھان
kān khān gān ghān
[kaːn kʰaːn ɡaːn ɡʱaːn]
'ear, mine, song, bundle'

Hindustani has a core set of 28 consonants inherited from earlier Indo-Aryan ancestors. Supplementing these are two consonants that are internal developments in specific word-medial contexts, and seven consonants originally found in loan words, whose expression is dependent on factors such as status (class, education, etc.) and cultural register (Hindi vs Urdu).

Most native consonants may occur geminate (doubled in length; exceptions are /ɽ, ɽʱ, ɦ/). Geminate consonants are always medial and preceded by one of the short vowels (that is, /ə/, /ɪ/ or /ʊ/). They all occur monomorphemically except [ʃː], which occurs only in a few Sanskrit loans where a morpheme boundary could be posited in between, e.g. /nɪʃ + ʃiːl/ for niśśīl [nɪˈʃːiːl] ('without shame').

For the English speaker, a notable feature of the Hindustani consonants is that there is a four-way distinction of phonation among plosives, rather than the two-way distinction found in English. The phonations are:

1. tenuis, as /p/, which is like ⟨p⟩ in English spin
2. voiced, as /b/, which is like ⟨b⟩ in English bin
3. aspirated, as /pʰ/, which is like ⟨p⟩ in English pin, and
4. murmured, as /bʱ/.

The last is commonly called "voiced aspirate", though notes that,

Evidence from experimental phonetics, however, has demonstrated that the two types of sounds involve two distinct types of voicing and release mechanisms. The series of so-called voice aspirates should now properly be considered to involve the voicing mechanism of murmur, in which the air flow passes through an aperture between the arytenoid cartilages, as opposed to passing between the ligamental vocal bands.

The murmured consonants are believed to be a reflex of murmured consonants in Proto-Indo-European, a phonation that is absent in all branches of the Indo-European family except Indo-Aryan and Armenian.

Hindustani consonant phonemes
		Labial	Dental/ Alveolar	Retroflex	Palatal (-alveolar)	Velar	Uvular	Glottal
Nasal		m	n	(ɳ)¹	(ɲ)⁴	ŋ		
Stop/ Affricate	voiceless	p	t̪	ʈ	t͡ʃ	k	(q)²	
Stop/ Affricate	voiceless aspirated	pʰ	t̪ʰ	ʈʰ	t͡ʃʰ	kʰ		
Stop/ Affricate	voiced	b	d̪	ɖ	d͡ʒ	ɡ		
Stop/ Affricate	voiced aspirated	bʱ	d̪ʱ	ɖʱ	d͡ʒʱ	ɡʱ		
Fricative	voiceless	f	s	(ʂ)¹	(ʃ)³	(x)²		ɦ
Fricative	voiced	ʋ	(z)²		(ʒ)²	(ɣ)²		ɦ
Approximant		ʋ	l		j			ɦ
Vibrant	unaspirated		ɾ	ɽ				
Vibrant	aspirated			ɽʱ				

Table notes

- ¹Only present in Sanskrit loanwords, predominant in Hindi (and marginally in Urdu as well).
- ²Only present in Arabic and Persian loanwords, predominant in Urdu.
- ³ Post-alveolar /ʃ/ is sometimes regarded as a substitution for retroflex /ʂ/ in colloquial pronunciation of Hindi. In Urdu (as well as in Hindi), on the other hand, /ʃ/ is a phoneme coming from Arabic and Persian loanwords; though this phoneme also does come from Sanskrit tatsamas as well.
- ⁴An allophone of /n/ before palatals.
- Marginal and non-universal phonemes are in parentheses.
- /ɽ/ is lateral [𝼈] for some speakers.
- /ɽʱ/ is mostly (but not always) tends to get de-aspirated to /ɽ/ in colloquial western Hindi, though explicitly retained as a distinct phoneme in eastern Hindi.
- Stand alone coda aspirates tend to get deaspirated, particularly before other consonants, eg. sāṭh sau, paṛhnā, mujh se [saːʈsɔː, pəɽnaː, mʊtʃseː].
- /x/, /ɣ/, and /q/ are usually (though not always) perceived post-velar.
- /x/, /ɣ/, /z/, and /q/ are mostly replaced by /kʰ/, /ɡ/, /d͡ʒ/, and /k/ respectively in Hindi, except in the careful speech of educated speakers. /ʒ/ is found in Urdu and is rarer in Hindi, often being replaced with /z/ (or further by /d͡ʒ/, or even /dʒʱ/ in rarer cases) in the latter; an example of a word containing this sound is aźdahā [əʒ.d̪ə.ɦɑː] (अझ़दहा – اژدہا 'dragon').
- /ŋ/ mostly only occurs in clusters before velars as in aṅkit, but there are also words like mumkin, tinkā, ākramaṇkārī, taṅqīd making it phonemic. Sanskritic loans with ṅ occurring elsewhere are made ṅg as in Sanskrit vāṅmaya being pronounced /ʋaːŋ(ɡ)mɛː/.
- Shifts before /ɦ/: Before h + a short vowel or deleted schwa, the pronunciation of short a shifts allophonically to short [ɛ] or [ɔ] (only if the short vowel is u). This change is part of the prestige dialect of Delhi, but may not occur to the full degree for every speaker. Often, this step is taken further by assimilation of short vowel after /ɦ/ to [ɛ] or [ɔ], and then by loss of /ɦ/ and coalescence/lengthening of vowels into long /ɛː/ and /ɔː/. In some cases, different inflections of the same word have differing outcomes.

Hindustani bahut (बहुत بہت, /bǝ.ɦʊt̪/) > [bɔ.ɦʊt̪] > [bɔ.ɦɔt̪] > [bɔːt̪] "a lot, many" Hindustani kahnā (कहना کہنا, /kǝɦ.näː/) > [kɛɦ.näː] > [kɛː.näː] "to say", but kahēgā (कहेगा کہے گا) "he will say" is still pronounced regularly as [kǝ.ɦeː.gäː].

Stops in final position are not released, although they continue to maintain the four-way phonation distinction in final position. /ʋ/ varies freely with [v], and can also be pronounced [w]. /r/ is usually flapped or trilled. In intervocalic position, it may have a single contact and be described as a flap [ɾ], but it may also be a clear trill, especially in word-initial and syllable-final positions, and geminate /rː/ is always a trill in Arabic and Persian loanwords, e.g. zarā [zəɾaː] (ज़रा – ذرا 'little') versus well-trilled zarrā [zəraː] (ज़र्रा – ذرہ 'particle'). The palatal and velar nasals [ɲ, ŋ] occur only in consonant clusters, where each nasal is followed by a homorganic stop, as an allophone of a nasal vowel followed by a stop, and in Sanskrit loanwords. However /n/ + velar clusters also occur, eg. /ʊn.kaː/ making /ŋ/ phonemic. There are native murmured sonorants, [lʱ, rʱ, mʱ, nʱ], eg. nanhā, lhēsnā, kulhāṛī, tumhārā (< ślakṣṇa, ślēṣayati, kuṭhāra, yuṣmē-) there are cases where mbh becomes mh as in sam(b)hālna, also from tatsamas e.g. arhat, but these are considered to be consonant clusters with /ɦ/ in the analysis adopted by.

The fricative /ɦ/ in Hindustani is typically voiced (as [ɦ]), especially when surrounded by vowels, but there is no phonemic difference between this voiced fricative and its voiceless counterpart [h].

Hindustani also has a phonemic difference between the dental plosives and the so-called retroflex plosives. The dental plosives in Hindustani are laminal denti-alveolar (as in Spanish, Portuguese, etc.), and the tongue-tip must be well in contact with the back of the upper front teeth. The retroflex series is not purely retroflex; it actually has an apico-postalveolar (also described as apico-pre-palatal) articulation, and sometimes in words such as ṭūṭā /ʈuːʈaː/ (टूटा – ٹوٹا 'broken') it even becomes alveolar (especially in Urdu).

In many Indo-Aryan languages, the plosives [ɖ, ɖʱ] and the flaps [ɽ, ɽʱ] are allophones in complementary distribution, with the former occurring in initial, geminate and postnasal positions and the latter occurring in intervocalic and final positions. Standard Hindi also does this, as in nīṛaj [niːɽədʒ] (नीड़ज – نیڑج 'bird'), phonemically /niːɖədʒ/. However this is moreso morpheme initial than word initial in Standard Hindi, thus some instances of [ɖ] or even [ɖʱ] seemingly occur in medial positions as well. A classic example is niḍar (निडर – نڈر 'fearless'), from ni- (नि- - ن) 'negative prefix') + ḍar (डर - ڈر) 'fear'. .

=== Allophony of [v] and [w] ===
Hindustani does not distinguish between [v] and [w], specifically Hindi. These are distinct phonemes in English, but conditional allophones of the phoneme /ʋ/ in Hindustani (written ⟨व⟩ in Hindi or ⟨و⟩ in Urdu), meaning that contextual rules determine when it is pronounced as [v] and when it is pronounced as [w]. /ʋ/ is pronounced [w] in onglide position, i.e. between an onset consonant and a following vowel, as in dvīp (द्वीप دویپ, 'island'), and [v] elsewhere (though it is not universal), as in vrat (व्रत ورت, 'vow'). Native Hindi-Urdu speakers are usually unaware of the allophonic distinctions, though these are apparent to native English speakers (as well as usually to speakers of the Eastern Indo-Aryan languages, such as Odia, Bengali, and Assamese).

When /ʋ/ is preceded by a consonant which itself is preceded by a vowel (i.e. in the environment VC_), the allophony is non-conditional, i.e. the speaker can choose [v], [w], or an intermediate sound based on personal habit and preference, and still be perfectly intelligible. This is due to ambiguity in the syllabification of such words. For example, advait (अद्वैत ادویت) which is underlyingly /əd̪ʋɛːt̪/, may be syllabified as /ə.d̪ʋɛːt̪/, /əd̪.ʋɛːt̪/, or /əd̪.d̪ʋɛːt̪/. Accordingly, the word can be pronounced equally correctly as [əˈd̪wɛːt̪], [əd̪ˈvɛːt̪], or [əd̪ˈd̪wɛːt̪].

In final clusters, /ʋ/ is [w] when preceded by a more sonorous consonant and [v] otherwise. For example, dvandv (द्वंद्व دوندو, 'pair') is pronounced [d̪wən̪d̪w], but garv (गर्व گرو, 'pride') is usually (though not always) pronounced [gəɾv].

=== External borrowing ===
Sanskrit borrowing has reintroduced /ɳ/ and /ʂ/ into formal Modern Standard Hindi. They occur primarily in Sanskrit loanwords and proper nouns. In casual speech (as well as in Urdu), they are usually replaced with /n/ and /ʃ/. /ɳ/ does not occur word-initially and has a nasalized flap [ɽ̃] as a common allophone.

Loanwords from Persian (including some words which Persian itself borrowed from Arabic or Turkic languages), or even directly from Arabic, introduced six consonants, /f, z, ʒ, q, x, ɣ/. Being Perso-Arabic in origin, these are seen as a defining feature of Urdu, although these sounds officially exist in Hindi and modified Devanagari characters are available to represent them. Among these, /f, z/, also found in English, French and Portuguese loanwords, are now considered well-established in Hindi (though not in the rural parts of India, as well as among older generation-speakers); indeed, /f/ appears to be encroaching upon and replacing /pʰ/ even in native (non-Persian, non-English, non-Portuguese) Hindi words as well as many other Indian languages such as Punjabi, Bengali, Gujarati, Marathi and Malayalam as happened in Greek with phi. This /pʰ/ to /f/ shift also occasionally occurs in Urdu (especially in India). While [z] is a foreign sound, it is also natively found as an allophone of /s/ beside voiced consonants, eg, rasgullā, nasbandī. Similarly, v can get devoiced before voiceless consonants, eg., (when pronounced as "bēvqūf").

The other three Persian loans, /q, x, ɣ/, are still considered to fall under the domain of Urdu, and are also used by some Hindi speakers; however, other Hindi speakers may assimilate these sounds to /k, kʰ, g/ respectively. The sibilant /ʃ/ is found in loanwords from all sources (Arabic, English, Portuguese, Persian, Sanskrit) and is well-established. Some Hindi speakers (especially those from rural areas, as well as among older generation-speakers) pronounce the /f, z, ʃ/ sounds as /pʰ, dʒ, s/, though these same speakers, having a Sanskritic education, do hyperformally uphold /ɳ/ and /ʂ/. In contrast, for native speakers of Urdu, the maintenance of /f, z, ʃ/ is not commensurate with education and sophistication, but is characteristic of all social levels. The sibilant /ʒ/, found in loanwords from Persian, Portuguese, French, and English, is very rare and is considered to fall under the domain of Urdu; although it is officially present in Hindi, many speakers of Hindi assimilate it to /z/, /dʒ/, or even /dʒʱ/.

Being the main sources from which Hindustani draws its higher, learned terms, English, Sanskrit, Arabic, and to a lesser extent Persian provide loanwords with a rich array of consonant clusters. The introduction of these clusters into the language contravenes a historical tendency within its native core vocabulary to eliminate clusters through processes such as cluster reduction and epenthesis. lists distinctively Sanskrit/Hindi biconsonantal clusters /kj, kr, kl, kʃ, sk, st, sʋ, ʃr, ʃʋ, sn, sp, sm, sj, sʋ, nj, tj, tʋ, dj, dʋ, nj, lj, rj, mj, nʋ, lʋ, rʋ, mʋ, dʒj, dʒʋ, tʃj, tʃʋ, rj, ʂk, ʂʈ, ʂɳ, ʂp, ʂm, ʂj, ʂʋ/, and distinctively Perso-Arabic/Urdu biconsonantal clusters /ʃt, ʃk, ʒd, ʒg, fʃ, ʃf, ft, tf, fr, lx, xl, rf, fr, xf, mt, ms, mz, bl, nz, zf, fz, zq, qz, xr, rx, xt, qt, tq, nf, fn, nx, xn, mx, xm, xʃ, ɣz, rɣ/.

== Suprasegmental features ==
Hindustani has a stress accent, but it is not as important as in English. To predict stress placement, the concept of syllable weight is needed:

- A light syllable (one mora) ends in a short vowel /ə, ɪ, ʊ/: V
- A heavy syllable (two moras) ends in a long vowel /aː, iː, uː, eː, ɛː, oː, ɔː/ or in a short vowel and a consonant: VV, VC
- An extra-heavy syllable (three moras) ends in a long vowel and a consonant, or a short vowel and two consonants: VVC, VCC

Stress is on the heaviest syllable of the word, and in the event of a tie, on the last such syllable. However, the final mora of the word is ignored when making this assignment, so if all syllables are light, the penult is stressed. [or, equivalently, the final syllable is stressed either if it is extra-heavy and there is no other extra-heavy syllable in the word or if it is heavy, and there is no other heavy or extra-heavy syllable in the word]. For example, with the ignored mora in parentheses:

Examples of Hindustani stress
Hindi spelling	Urdu spelling	Romanization	Pronunciation	Gloss
रेज़गारी	ریزگاری	rēzgārī	[ˈreːz.ɡaː.ri(ː)]	small change, coins
समिति	سمتی	samiti	[sə.ˈmɪ.t(ɪ)]	committee
क़िस्मत	قسمت	qismat	[ˈqɪs.mə(t)]	fate
रोज़ाना	روزانہ	rōzānā	[roː.ˈzaː.na(ː)]	daily
किधर	کدھر	kidhar	[kɪ.ˈdʱə(r)]	where, where to
जनाब	جناب	janāb	[dʒə.ˈnaː(b)]	sir, mister
असबाब	اسباب	asbāb	[əs.ˈbaː(b)]	goods, property
मुसलमान	مسلمان	musalmān	[mʊ.səl.ˈmaː(n)]	Muslim
परवरदिगार	پروردگار	parvardigār	[pər.ʋər.dɪ.ˈɡaː(r)]	epithet of God

Content words in Hindustani normally begin on a low pitch, followed by a rise in pitch. Strictly speaking, Hindustani, like most other Indian languages, is rather a syllable-timed language. The schwa /ə/ has a strong tendency to vanish into nothing (syncopated) if its syllable is unaccented.

== See also ==
- Schwa deletion in Indo-Aryan languages
- Devanagari
- Urdu alphabet
- Phonological history of Hindustani

== Bibliography ==
- Cardona, George; Jain, Dhanesh, eds. (2003). The Indo-Aryan Languages. Routledge. ISBN 9781135797102.
- Masica, Colin (1991). The Indo-Aryan Languages. Cambridge: Cambridge University Press. ISBN 978-0-521-29944-2.
- Hayes, Bruce (1995). Metrical stress theory. University of Chicago Press.
- Hussein, Sarmad (1997). Phonetic Correlates of Lexical Stress in Urdu (PhD dissertation). Northwestern University.
- Kachru, Yamuna (2006). Hindi. John Benjamins Publishing. ISBN 90-272-3812-X.
- Kelkar, Ashok R. (1968). Studies in Hindi-Urdu, I: Introduction and Word Phonology. Building Centenary and Silver Jubilee Series, 35. Poona: Deccan College.
- Ohala, Manjari (1999). "Hindi". In International Phonetic Association (ed.). Handbook of the International Phonetic Association: a Guide to the Use of the International Phonetic Alphabet. Cambridge University Press. pp. 100–103. ISBN 978-0-521-63751-0.
- Schmidt, Ruth Laila (2003). "Urdu". In Cardona, George; Jain, Dhanesh (eds.). The Indo-Aryan Languages. Routledge. pp. 286–350. ISBN 978-0-415-77294-5.
- Shapiro, Michael C. (2003). "Hindi". In Cardona, George; Jain, Dhanesh (eds.). The Indo-Aryan Languages. Routledge. pp. 250–285. ISBN 978-0-415-77294-5.
- Gupta, B. P. (1982). "A Rule of Deaspiration in Colloquial Hindi". Indo-Iranian Journal. 24 (3): 191–200. doi:10.1163/000000082790081186. ISSN 0019-7246. JSTOR 24653624.
- Kulshreshtha, Manisha; Mathur, Ramkumar (2012). Dialect Accent Features for Establishing Speaker Identity: A Case Study. Springer Science & Business Media. p. 19. ISBN 978-1-4614-1137-6.
- Say It in Hindi. Dover Publications. 1981. ISBN 9780486137919.
- Morelli, Sarah (2019). A Guru's Journey: Pandit Chitresh Das and Indian Classical Dance in Diaspora. University of Illinois Press. ISBN 978-0-252-05172-2.
- Pandey, Dipti; Mondal, Tapabrata; Agrawal, S. S.; Bangalore, Srinivas (2013). Development and suitability of Indian languages speech database for building watson based ASR system. 2013 International Conference Oriental COCOSDA held jointly with 2013 Conference on Asian Spoken Language Research and Evaluation (O-COCOSDA/CASLRE). p. 3. doi:10.1109/ICSDA.2013.6709861. ISBN 978-1-4799-2378-6. S2CID 26461938.
- "Meaning of azhdaha in English". Rekhta Dictionary. 2023.
- Pierrehumbert, Janet; Nair, Rami (1996). "Implications of Hindi Prosodic Structure". In Durand, Jacques; Laks, Bernard (eds.). Current Trends in Phonology: Models and Methods. European Studies Research Institute, University of Salford Press. ISBN 978-1-901471-02-1.
- Shapiro, Michael C. (1989). A Primer of Modern Standard Hindi. Motilal Banarsidass. ISBN 978-81-208-0508-8.
- "Hindi Urdu Machine Transliteration using Finite-state Transducers" (PDF). Association for Computational Linguistics. n.d.
- Remitly Editorial Staff (2026). "Hindi Phonology: A Complete Guide to Sounds and Pronunciation". Beyond Borders.
- Hassan, Nazir (1980). Urdu Phonetic Reader.
- Koul, Omkar Nath (1994). Hindi Phonetic Reader. Indian Institute of Language Studies.
- Foreign Service Institute (1957). Hindi: Basic Course.
- Cummings, Thomas (1915). An Urdu Manual of the Phonetic, Inductive or Direct Method.
- Tiwari, Bholanath (2004) [1966]. Hindī Bhāshā. Allahabad: Kitāb Mahal. ISBN 81-225-0017-X.
- Chawla, Taniya; Meigh, Kimberly M. (2020). "Acoustics of Retroflex Sounds in Hindi and Other Languages". Perspectives of the ASHA Special Interest Groups. 5 (3): 726–728. doi:10.1044/2020_PERSP-19-00003.
- "Comparative Acoustic-Phonetic Analysis of Retroflex Consonants of Some Indian Languages" (PDF). RWTH Aachen University. n.d.
- "Awadhi language" (PDF). Internet Archive. 2020.
- Dyrud, Lars O. (2001). Hindi-Urdu: Stress Accent or Non-Stress Accent? (PDF) (Master's thesis). University of North Dakota.
- Rao, G. V. Ramana; Srichand, J. (1996). Word Boundary Detection Using Pitch Variations (PDF). International Conference on Spoken Language Processing (ICSLP). IIT Madras, Dept. of Computer Science and Engineering. Archived from the original (PDF) on 25 October 2007.
