= Sadhu bhasha =

Historical literary register of Bengali

Sadhu Bhasha
- Standard Literary Bengali; Sanskritised Bengali
- সাধু ভাষা সাধু বাংলা
- Region: Bengal
- Era: 18th century–present
- Language family: Indo-European: Indo-Iranian; Indo-Aryan; Eastern; Bengali-Assamese; Bengali; Sadhu Bhasha

Language codes
- ISO 639-3: –

Sadhu bhasha (Bengali: সাধু ভাষা, romanized: Sādhu bhāṣā, lit. 'Chaste language'), also Standard literary Bengali, Sanskritised Bengali or Sadhu Bengali is a historical literary register of the Bengali language most prominently used in the 19th to 20th centuries during the Bengali Renaissance, currently in very limited usage. Sadhu bhasha is used only in writing, unlike Cholito bhasha, the colloquial form of the language, which was used in both writing and speaking. These two literary forms of Bengali are examples of diglossia.

== History ==
This Sanskritised form of Bengali is notable for its variations in verb forms and the vocabulary which is mainly composed of Sanskrit or tatsama words. It was mainly a vocabulary making it easier for literary works in Sanskrit to be translated. Notable among them was Ishwar Chandra Vidyasagar, who standardised the Bengali alphabet and paved the path for literary works. The colloquial usage of Bengali consisted mostly of its Prakrit (tadbhava and indigenous (deshi) words) base, and occasionally Persian and Arabic words (i.e., Dobhashi; though not to the extent used by Dobhashi) embedded into the vocabulary. As a result, the Brahmins, a Hindu pandit caste, chose the path of Sanskritisation to make a pure language which would be used as a representative of classical languages into which the works of Sanskrit and Hindu literature can be translated. This shifted Bengali further towards Sanskrit thus archaising its vocabulary. This in turn increased the commonality in Bengali vocabulary with other Indo-Aryan languages, such as Hindi, Marathi and Odia; which has also consciously replaced (and even purged out) Persian and Arabic words, expressions and elements with Sanskrit tatsamas and Prakrit tadbhavas.

By the time of Rabindranath Tagore, the Sadhu-ness (purity) of the literary form had largely waned into just a set of Sanskrit verb forms and in a decade, Tagore himself would switch to writing in Cholito Bhasha. Radha Nag's book Atmaghati Nirad Choudhuri আত্মঘাতী নীরদ চৌধুরী (transl. Suicidal Nirad Choudhuri) appears as the last Bengali book written in Sadhu Bhasha.

Bangladeshi writer, intellectual, academic Salimullah Khan has been writing in Sadhu Bhasha since 2005.

The newspaper Anandabazar Patrika uses Sadhu Bhasha on their editorial column, partially, even today.

== Presence in historical literature ==
The mid-19th century hosted two influential writers of Sadhu bhasha; Ishwar Chandra Vidyasagar and Bankim Chandra Chattopadhyay. Vidyasagar's style was very conservative towards withholding only the use of tatsama (Sanskrit) when writing. His style came to be known as Vidyasagari and Akshay Kumar Datta also wrote in this style. Chatterjee's writing style was somewhat more lenient to the use of tadbhava and deshi vocabulary. It came to be known as Bankimi – a more popular style, it was practised by the likes of Rabindranath Tagore, Hara Prasad Shastri, Dinesh Chandra Sen, Mir Mosharraf Hossain and Ismail Hossain Siraji.

== Current usages ==
Current usage of this register is very limited. Though it has its presence in various government affairs of both Bangladesh and West Bengal, such as documents, gazettes, oaths and disclaimers. Beside that it is also exclusively found in traditional invitation cards in Bengal. Few newspaper still print their editorials in it, like Anandabazar Patrika of West Bengal and Dainik Ittefaq of Bangladesh.

== Sample text ==
The following is a sample text in Sadhu bhasha of Article 1 of the Universal Declaration of Human Rights:

Bengali in the Bengali alphabet

ধারা ১: সমস্ত মানুষ স্বাধীনভাবে সমান মর্যাদা এবং অধিকার লইয়া জন্মগ্রহণ করে। তাঁহাদিগের বিবেক এবং বুদ্ধি আছে; সুতরাং সকলেরই একে অপরের প্রতি ভ্রাতৃত্বসুলভ মনোভাব লইয়া আচরণ করা উচিৎ।

Bengali in phonetic Romanization

Dhara êk: Sômôstô manush shadhinbhabe sôman môrjada ebông ôdhikar lôiya jônmôgrôhôṇ kôre. Tãhādiger bibek ebông buddhi achhe; sutôrang sôkôleri êke ôpôrer prôti bhratrittôsulôbh mônobhab lôiya achôrôṇ kôra uchit.

Bengali in the International Phonetic Alphabet

d̪ʱara ɛk | ʃɔmost̪o manuʃ ʃad̪ʱinbʱabe ʃɔman mɔɾdʒad̪a ebɔŋ od̪ʱikaɾ loija dʒɔnmoɡrohon kɔre | t̪ãhād̪iger bibek ebɔŋ bud̪d̪ʱi atʃʰe | ʃut̪oraŋ ʃɔkoleri ɛke ɔporer prot̪i bʱrat̪rit̪ːoʃulɔbʱ monobʱab loija atʃorɔn kɔra utʃit̪

Gloss

Clause 1: All human free-manner-in equal dignity and right taken birth-take do. Their reason and intelligence exist; therefore everyone-indeed one another's towards brotherhood-ly mind-spirit taken conduct do should.

Translation

Article 1: All human beings are born free and equal in dignity and rights. They possess conscience and reason. Therefore, everyone should act in a spirit of brotherhood towards each other.

=== Cholit bhasa ===
The following is a sample text in Cholit-Bhasha of Article 1 of the Universal Declaration of Human Rights:

Bengali in the Bengali alphabet

ধারা ১: সব মানুষ স্বাধীনভাবে সমান মর্যাদা আর অধিকার নিয়ে জন্ম নেয়। তাঁদের বিবেক আর বুদ্ধি আছে; তাই সবারই একে অপরের দিকে ভাইয়ের মতো মনের ভাব নিয়ে আচরণ করা উচিত।

Bengali in phonetic Romanization

Dhara êk: Sôb manush shadhinbhabe sôman môrjada ar ôdhikar niye jônmo ney. Tãder bibek ar buddhi achhe; tai sôbari êke ôpôrer dike bhaijer môto môner bhab niye achôrôn kôra uchit.

Bengali in the International Phonetic Alphabet

d̪ʱara ɛk | ʃɔb manuʃ ʃad̪ʱinbʱabe ʃɔman mɔɾdʒad̪a ar ɔd̪ʱikaɾ nie̯e dʒɔnmo næy | t̪ãd̪eɾ bibek ar bud̪ʱːi atʃʰe | t̪ai ʃɔbaɾi ɛke ɔpɔreɾ d̪ike bʱaijer mɔt̪o mɔner bʱab nie̯e atʃɔrɔn kɔra utʃit̪

Gloss

Clause 1: All human free-manner-in equal dignity and right taken bear. Their reason and intelligence exist; so everyone-indeed one another's direction-to brother's like mind's spirit taken conduct do should.

Translation

Article 1: All human beings are born free and equal in dignity and rights. They possess conscience and reason. Therefore, everyone should act in a spirit of brotherhood towards each other.

== See also ==
- Dobhashi
- Sadhukkari
- Sant Bhasha
- Bengali poetry
- Alaler Gharer Dulal

== Bibliography ==
- Chatterji, Suniti Kumar (1926). The Origin and Development of the Bengali Language. Calcutta University Press.
