= Bengali vocabulary =

1. Native words (Inherited from Indo-Aryan and Indigenous vocabulary) (72.0%)
2. Foreign Loanwords (words originating from Persian, Turkish, Arabic, English, Portuguese, Dutch etc.) (28.0%)

Bengali (বাংলা Bāṅglā) is one of the Eastern Indo-Aryan languages, which evolved from Magadhi Prakrit, native to the eastern Indian subcontinent. The core of the Bengali vocabulary is thus etymologically of Magadhi Prakrit and Abahattha origin, with significant ancient borrowings from the older substrate language(s) of the region. However, in medieval times, more borrowings have occurred, from Sanskrit, Arabic, Classical Persian, Turkic (particularly Chagatai) and other languages leading to the adoption of a wide range of words with foreign origins; thus making the origins of borrowed words in the Bengali vocabulary numerous and diverse, due to centuries of contact with various languages.

== Origins of words in Bengali ==
Bengali is typically thought to have more than 100,000 separate words. There are differing opinions among various linguists and lexicographers regarding the total number of words in the Bengali vocabulary and their origins. Native words in the Bengali vocabulary are considered to be 72-96% and foreign words are considered to be 4%-28%. The first edition of Jnanendra Mohan Das's Bengali dictionary, published in 1917, included a total of 75,000 Bengali words. Later, in the second edition of the book published in 1937, the number of words rose to 115,000. Of these words, about 52% were of Tadbhava and Deśi (native words, inherited from Indo-Aryan and indigineous vocabulary) origin. Tatsama (words directly borrowed from Sanskrit) words were 44% and about 4% were foreign words. According to linguist Dr. Muhammad Enamul Haque, Bengali language consists of 25-30% Tatsama, 60% Tadbhava, 2% Desi and 8% foreign words. According to the estimation of Niladri Shekhar Dash, 21,000 (21%) words are considered to be তদ্ভব tôdbhôbô or tadbhava, 40,000 (40%) are তৎসম tôtśômô or tatsama, and borrowings from দেশী deśi, or "indigenous" words, which are at around 10,000 (10%) of the Bengali vocabulary. The rest are বিদেশী bideśi or "foreign" sources, including Persian, Turkish, Arabic, and English, among others, accounting for around 28,000 (28%) of all Bengali words, of which 14% are from English, 6% Arabic, 5% Persian and 3% are from other languages. According to him, approximately 72% of Bengali vocabulary from native stocks (Tatsama, Tadbhava and Deśi) and 28% from foreign stocks. It is highlighting the significant influence that foreign languages and cultures have had on the Bengali language throughout Bengal's long history of contact with different peoples and the cultural exchanges that came with such interactions.

Persian had one of the most significant influences in terms of foreign loanwords, and numerous sources put this figure at around 10,000 words at a minimum, which includes words that were borrowed directly from Persian and words influenced by it. However, these figures do not reflect the average Bengali speaker's vocabulary, as this will vary greatly by dialect. For example, Muslims and Bangladeshis typically lean on more Persian and Arabic words in their Bengali than their Hindu and Indian Bengali counterparts. Persian influence was so significant throughout Bengal's history, and was the official language of the region for 600 years, until the British arrived and changed it to English in 1836. Persian influence was so extensive that during the medieval Bengal period, a register of highly Persianized Bengali formed, known as Dobhashi, which was used by administrative officials and for literary purposes.

== Differences in vocabulary ==
This table below compares the differences of spoken and used Bengali vocabularies in Dhaka (Bangladesh) and Shantipur (West Bengal, India).

Word	Dhakaiya dialect	Dhakaiya transcription	Shantipuri dialect	Shantipuri transcription
Water	পানি, জল	pani, jôl	জল	jôl
Salt	লবণ	lôbôn	নুন	nun
Invitation	দাওয়াত, নিমন্তন্ন	dawat, nimôntônnô	আমন্ত্রণ/নিমন্ত্রণ/নেমন্তন্ন	amôntrôn/nimôntrôn/nemôntônnô
Chili	মরিচ	môric	লঙ্কা	laṅkā
Maternal aunt	খালা, মাসি	khala, māsi	মাসি	māsi
Paternal aunt	ফুফু, পিসি	phuphu, pisi	পিসি	pisi
Bath	গোসল, স্নান	gosôl, snān	স্নান/চান	snān/chān
Wind	বাতাস	bātās	হাওয়া	hāoā

== Examples of borrowed words ==
Due to centuries of contact with Mughals, Arabs, Persians, Central Asians, and Europeans, the Bengali language has absorbed countless words from foreign languages, often totally integrating these borrowings into the core vocabulary. The most common borrowings from foreign languages come from three different kinds of contact. After centuries of contact from Persia and the Middle East, followed by the invasions of the Mughal Empire, numerous Turkic, Arabic, and Persian words were absorbed and fully integrated into the lexicon. Later, European colonialism brought words from Portuguese, French, Dutch, and most significantly English. Bengali's relationship with Sanskrit is unique because Bengali descends from Middle Indo-Aryan languages (like Magadhi Prakrit), which themselves evolved from Sanskrit. Some very common borrowings are shown below.

=== Sanskrit (সংস্কৃত Sôṅskritô) ===
Word	IPA	Meaning
বিশ্ব	biʃ.ʃo	world
ধন্যবাদ	d̪ʱon.no.bad̪	thanks
আশীর্বাদ	aʃiɾ.bad	blessing
স্বাগত	sa.ɡo.t̪o	welcome
নির্বাণ	niɾ.ban	Nirvana
যোগা/ইয়োগা	d͡ʑo.ga/jo.ga	Yoga
আর্য	aɾ.d͡ʒo	Aryan
আসন	a.son	seat
আশ্রম	aʃ.ɾom	hermitage or monastery
অবতার	ɔbo.t̪aɾ	Avatar
আয়ুর্বেদ	ajuɾ.bed̪	Ayurveda
বন্ধু	bon.dʱu	friend
বাসমতী	bas.mot̪i	Basmati rice
ভাং	bʱaŋ	Bhang
ধুতি	d̪ʱu.t̪i	Dhoti
লুঠ	lutʱ	Looting
মায়া	ma.ja	Maya
সখা	sɔ.kʰa	friend
স্বামী	sa.mi	Husband
লাখ	lakʰ	Lakh
লক্ষ্মী	lok.kʰi	Lakshmi

=== Substrate languages (দেশী Deśi "Native") ===
Word	Meaning
কুড়ি ku.ɽi	twenty
খোঁচা khõ.t͡ɕa	poke
ঝিনুক d͡ʑʱi.nu.k	shell
ঢং dʱɔŋ	guile, dissimulation; fashion
মাঠ matʰ	field, open land
মুড়ি mu.ɽi	puffed rice

=== Foreign (বিদেশী Bideśi) ===
==== Classical Persian (ফারসি Farsi) ====
Word	Pronunciation	Meaning	Original form
আবহাওয়া abohawa	a.bo.ɦa.wa	weather	آب و هوا āb-o-hawā
চাকরি cakri	t͡ɕak.ri	job	چاکری čakri
আয়না ayna	aj.na	mirror	آینه āynah
আরাম aram	a.ɾam	comfort	آرام ārām
বকশিশ bôkśiś	bok.ʃiʃ	tip	بخشش baxšiš
মুসলমান musôlman	musol.man	Muslim	مسلمان musalmān
আস্তে aste	as.t̪e	slowly, softly	آهسته āhistah "slowly"
কম kôm	kɔm	less, few	كم kam
কাগজ kagôj	ka.ɡod͡ɕ	paper	كاغذ kāğaz
খোদা khoda	kʰo.d̪a	god	خدا xoda
খুব khub	kʰub	very, greatly	خوب xūb "good"
গরম gôrôm	ɡɔ.ɾom	hot	گرم garm
চশম côśôm	t͡ɕɔʃom	eye	چشم čašm
চাকর cakôr	t͡ɕɐ.koɾ	employee, servant	چاکر čākar
চাদর cadôr	t͡ɕa.d̪oɾ	blanket	چادر čādar
জান jan	d͡ʑɐn	dear	جان jān
জায়গা jayga	d͡ʑɐj.ɡa	place	جايگاه jāegāh
ডেগচি ḍegci	deɡ.t͡ɕi	pot	ديگچه dēgčah
দম dôm	d̪ɔm	breath	دم dam
দের der	d̪e.r	late	دير dēr
দোকান dokan	d̪o.kan	store, shop	دكان dukān
পর্দা pôrda	pɔr.d̪a	curtain	پرده pardah
বদ bôd	bɔˑd̪	bad	بد bad
বাগান bagan	ba.ɡan	garden	باغوان bāğwān
রাস্তা rasta	ras.t̪a	road, way	راسته rāstah
রোজ roj	roˑd͡ʑ	everyday	روز rōz "day"
হিন্দু Hindu	hin.d̪u	Hindu	هندو Hindū
পছন্দ pôchôndô	pɔ.t͡ɕʰon.d̪o	like, appreciate	پسند pasand
টেক্কা ṭekka	tek.ka	ace	تيكه tika "contract"
খুন khun	kʰuˑn	kill	خون xūn "blood"
আঙ্গুর āṅgur	aŋ.guɾ	grape	انگور angūr
আওয়াজ aoaj	a.wad͡ʑ	sound	آواز āwāz

==== Arabic (আরবি Arbi) ====
Word	Bangla transliteration	English meaning	Original form	IPA
আসল	aśôl	real	أصل	aṣl
আহাদ	ahad	one	أحد	ahad
এলাকা	elaka	area	علاقة ("relationship")	ʕalāqa
ওজন	ojôn	weight	وزن	wazn
কলম	kôlôm	pen	قلم	qalam
কিসমত	kismôt	luck	قسمة	qisma(t)
খবর	khôbôr	news	خبر	xabr
খারাপ	kharap	bad	خراب	xarāb
খালাস	khalas	conclusion	خلاص	xalāṣ
খালি	khali	empty	خالي	xālī
খেয়াল	kheyal	consideration	خيال	xayāl
গরিব	gôrib	poor	غريب	ğarīb
জমা	jôma	collect	جمعة	jamʿah
তারিখ	tarikh	date	تاريخ	tārīx
দুনিয়া	duniya	world	دﻧﯿـا	dunya
নকল	nôkôl	fake	نقل	naql
ফকির	phôkir	poor person	فقير	faqīr
বদল	bodol	exchange	بدل	badl
বাকি	baki	remaining	باقي	bāqī
শয়তান	śôytan	devil, Satan	شَيْطَان	šayṭan
সাহেব	śaheb	sir, Sahib	صاحب	ṣāḥib
সনদ	śônôd	certificate	سَنْد	sand
সন	śôn	year	سَنَة	sanah
হেকিম	hekim	physician	حكيم	ḥakīm
হিসাব	hiśab	calculation	حساب	ḥisāb

==== Chagatai Turkic (তুর্কি Turki) ====
Word	Meaning	Original form
আপা apa	elder sister, any unknown adult lady	apa
চকমক cokmok	lighter	çakmak
বেগম begôm	lady	begüm

==== Portuguese (পর্তুগিজ Pôrtugij) ====
Word	Meaning	Original form
আলমারি almari	closet, cupboard	armário
আয়া aya	nurse	aia
ইস্ত্রি istri ইস্তিরি istiri	to iron	estirar
ইস্পাত iśpat	steel	espada "sword"
গামলা gamla	basket	gamela "wooden trough"
চাবি cabi	key	chave
জানালা janala	window	janela
তামাক tamak	tobacco	tabaco
পেরেক perek	nail	prego
ফিতা phita	lace, ribbon	fita
বারান্দা baranda	verandah	varanda
বালতি balti	Bucket	balde
বেহালা behala	viola	viola
বোতাম botam	button	botão
সাবান śaban	soap	sabão
কেদারা kedara	chair	cadeira
আতা ata	custard apple	ata
আনারস anarôś	pineapple	ananás
কাজু kaju	cashew	cajú
কপি kôpi	cabbage, cauliflower	couve
পাঁউ pãu	European-style bread	pão
পেঁপে pẽpe	papaya	papaia
নিলাম nilam	auction	leilão
পেয়ারা peyara	guava	pera "pear"
সালাদ salad	salad	salada
ক্রুশ krush	cross	cruz
গির্জা girja	church	igreja
যিশু Jiśu	Jesus	Jesus
পাদ্রি padri	Catholic priest	padre
ইংরেজ iṅgrej	English	inglês

==== Dutch (ওলন্দাজ Olôndaj) ====
Word	Meaning	Original form
ইস্কাবন iskabôn ইশকাপন iśkapôn	spades	schoppen
রুইতন ruitôn	diamonds	ruiten (lit. "rhombi")
হরতন hôrotôn	hearts	harten
তুরুপ turup	trump	troef
ইস্ক্রুপ iskrup	screw	schroef

==== English (ইংরেজি Iṅreji) ====
Word	Original form
অফিস ôfiś	office
জেল jel	jail
ডাক্তার ḍaktar	doctor
পুলিশ puliś	police
ব্যাংক baṅk	bank
ভোট bhoṭ	vote
ইস্কুল iśkul স্কুল skul	school
হাসপাতাল haśpatal	hospital
কাপ kap	cup
গ্লাস glas	glass
চেয়ার ceyar	chair
টেবিল ṭebil	table
বাক্স bakśô	box
লণ্ঠন lônṭhôn	lantern
প্লাস্টিক plasṭik	plastic
কলেজ kôlej	college
সাইকেল saikel	bicycle
টাউট ṭauṭ	tout
ইঞ্জিন injin	engine
ক্যাঙারু kæṅgaru	kangaroo
বুমেরাং bumeraṅ	boomerang

==== French (ফরাসি Phôrasi) ====
Word	Meaning	Original form
ওলন্দাজ olôndaj	Dutch	hollandaise
কার্তুজ kartuj	cartridge	cartouche
রেস্তোরাঁ restorã	restaurant	restaurant
শেমিজ śemij	chemise	chemise "shirt"

==== Chinese (চীনা Cīna) ====
Word	Meaning	Original form
সাম্পান sampan	flat-bottomed wooden boat	舢舨 sampan

==== Japanese (জাপানি Japani) ====
Word	Meaning	Original form
মাঙ্গা maṅga	Manga	マンガ manga
সুনামি sunami	Tsunami	つなみ tsunami
রিকশা rikśā	Rickshaw	力車 rikisha "(man-) driven vehicle"

==== Burmese (বর্মী Bôrmī) ====
Word	Meaning	Original form
লুঙ্গি luṅgi	longyi	လုံချည် lum hkyany
ঘুঘনি ghughni		

==== German (জার্মান Jarman) ====
Word	Meaning	Original form
কিন্ডারগার্টেন kindargarten	kindergarten	
নাৎসি Natsi	Nazi	

==== Italian (ইতালীয় Italīẏô) ====
Word	Meaning	Original form
ফ্যাসিস্ট Phasist	Fascist	fascio
ম্যালেরিয়া malaria	malaria	
মাফিয়া maphiya	mafia	
স্টুডিও studio	studio	
