= List of Hindi television channels in Europe =

This is a list of Hindi channels in Europe.

== General entertainment ==
- Colors
- Colors Rishtey
- Sony SAB
- Sony TV
- Utsav Bharat
- Utsav Plus
- Zee TV

== Movies ==
- B4U Movies
- Colors Cineplex
- Sony Max
- Sony Max 2
- Utsav Gold
- Zee Cinema

== Music ==
- B4U Music
- MTV India

== News ==
- Aaj Tak
- NDTV 24x7
- NDTV India

== Religious ==
- Aastha Bhajan
- Aastha TV
- Ahsas TV
- Davi TV
- Muslim Television Ahmadiyya
- Peace TV
- Sikh Channel

== Selection Europe Only Channel/Yupp TV Exclusive ==
- ABP Asmita
- ABP Live
- ABP News
- Zee Aflam
- Zee Bangla
- Zee Jagran
- Zee News
- Zee One
- ZeeQ
- Zee Russia
- Zee Tamil
- Zee World

== Indian Government channels ==
- DD Bharati
- DD Cinema
- DD India ( on 2 January 2009 on SKY Digital)
- DD International
- DD Kids
- DD Kisan
- DD National
- DD News ( on 2 January 2009 on SKY Digital)
- DD North East
- DD Sports
