= Anglicisation (disambiguation) =

Anglicisation is a form of cultural assimilation whereby something non-English becomes assimilated into, influenced by or dominated by the culture of England.

Anglicisation can also refer to:

- Anglicisation (linguistics), the process by which a non-English word is influenced by English
- Anglicisation of names

== See also ==
- Anglicism, an English word borrowed into another language
- Englishisation, the influence of English on other languages
