= Indo-Aryan loanwords in Tamil =

Words borrowed from Indo-Aryan languages

The Tamil language of Dravidian family has absorbed many loanwords from Indo-Aryan family, predominantly from Prakrit, Pali and Sanskrit, ever since the early 1st millennium CE, when the Sangam period Chola kingdoms became influenced by spread of Jainism, Buddhism and early Hinduism. Many of these loans are obscured by adaptions to Tamil phonology.

There are many words that are cognates in Sanskrit and Tamil, in both tatsama and tadbhava forms. This is an illustrative list of Tamil words of Indo-Aryan origin, classified based on type of borrowing. The words are transliterated according to IAST system. All words have been referenced with the Madras University Tamil Lexicon, which is used as the most authoritative and standard lexicon by mainstream scholars. In the examples below, the second word is from Tamil, and its original Indo-Aryan source is placed to the left.

== Change of final retroflex to dental ==
- ambara - ampala

== Loss of initial s ==
- samayaṃ - amaiyam
- sabhā - avai

== Loss of initial complex consonant (retaining initial vowel) ==
- śṛavaṇa - Āvaṇi (also note loss of initial complex consonant Śr)

== Loss of initial complex consonant (introduction of vowel) ==
- ḥṛdaya - itaya (also loss of voicing)

== Loss of voicing ==
- agati - akati

== Loss of voiced aspiration ==
- adhikāra - atikāra
- adhika - atika

== Tatsama borrowing ==
- aṇu - aṇu
- nīti - nīti

== Change of final sibilant to semivowel ==
- Ākāśa - Ākāya

== Change of medial sibilants to stops ==
- aśuddha - acutta

== Split of complex syllables ==
- agni - akkini (gni to kini, also note loss of voicing)

== Others ==
- ahaṃkāram - akankāram (anger, arrogance, self-love)
- agastya - akattiya
- ahambhāva - akampāvam
- Āṣāḍha - Āḍi
- Ārambha - Ārampam
- kāvya - kāppiyam
- kārttika - kārttikai
- śvāsa - cuvācam
- śani - cani
- chitra - cittirai
- budha - putan
- phalguna - pankuni
- manas - manatu
- mārgaśīrSa - mārkazhi (month name: mid-December to mid-January)
- māgha - māci
- vaiśākha - vaikāci
