= Englishisation =

English influence on other languages

An amalgamation of the flags that represent the United States and the United Kingdom, the two countries at the forefront of spreading English across the world

Englishisation is the introduction of English-language influences into other languages. English, as a world language, has had a very significant impact on other languages, with many languages borrowing words or grammar from English or forming calques based on English words. Englishisation is often paired with the introduction of Western culture into other cultures, and has resulted in a significant degree of code-mixing of English with other languages as well as the appearance of new varieties of English. Other languages have also synthesised new literary genres through their contact with English, and various forms of "language play" have emerged through this interaction. Englishisation has also occurred in subtle ways because of the massive amount of English content that is translated into other languages.

Englishisation first happened on a worldwide scale because of the spread of the British Empire and American cultural influence, as the English language historically played a major role in the administration of Britain's colonies and is highly relevant in the modern wave of globalisation. One of the reasons for Englishisation is because other languages sometimes lacked vocabulary to talk about certain things, such as modern technologies or scientific concepts. Another reason is that English is often considered a prestige language which symbolises or improves the educatedness or status of a speaker.

In some cases, Englishisation clashes with linguistic purism or the influence of other prestige languages, as is the case with the contested Hindustani language, which in its Englishised form becomes Hinglish/Urdish, but which some seek to instead Sanskritise or Persianise or Arabise in part as a reaction to the colonial associations of the English language within South Asia.

== Around the world ==
=== Africa ===
Pidgin Englishes are common throughout Africa, such as West African Pidgin English.

Swahili, which is common in the former British colonies of East Africa, has been intentionally Englishised in order to allow for more conversation around modern technologies and concepts.

=== Americas ===
The Spanish language, which is widespread in the Americas, typically received loanwards from British English (often through French) until the 1950s, when American English's influence became more prominent.

==== Northern America ====
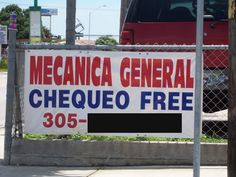
A sign in Miami using the English word free instead of the Spanish gratis

Spanish as spoken in the United States has significant amounts of English influence, dating back to the early 19th century and America's southwestern territorial expansion into Mexico.

==== Latin America and the Caribbean ====
English influences are common in Puerto Rican Spanish, due to the Americanisation of the island since the turn of the 20th century.

=== Asia ===
==== East Asia ====
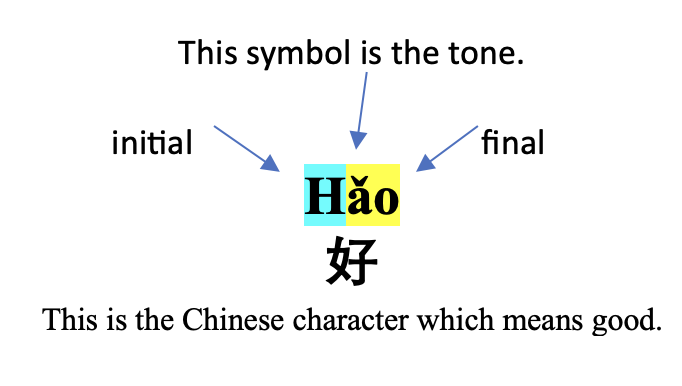
Pinyin, a Romanisation scheme, has aided Chinese speakers in learning English.

Both Japanese and Korean have borrowed many words from English. In Japan, English words are often used in a "decorative" manner to make a message look more modern.

In China, English vocabulary had a minimal influence on local languages, with new words often being coined to replace historical English loanwords. This is due in part to the Chinese writing system, which favours words which can be broken down into meaningful components. An exception to this is Hong Kong Cantonese, which has many words from English due to British rule in the city until 1997. Taiwan also tends to borrow more words directly from English. However, English grammar did have an influence on Chinese due to the amount of material being translated between the two languages during the Westernisation of China.

==== South Asia ====
A poster for the 1943 Bollywood film Kismet, which features the movie's name written in three different alphabets: Roman, Devanagari, and Urdu scripts. (in Hunterian: qismat)

English has been accepted in South Asia to some extent because of its neutrality i.e. its lack of association with any ethnic group in the region. It has played a significant role in enabling migration within the Indian subcontinent, and contributes a major share of the vocabulary used in more technical fields; even when Sanskrit words have been created to replace English words, they are often calqued from English words.

Due to the nature and long duration of British rule in India, some of the English words used are of military origin or are now obscure in the rest of the English-speaking world.

==== Southeast Asia ====
The English language has had a significant influence on Tagalog since the 1898 American acquisition of the Philippines.

==== West Asia ====
English has had a growing presence in the Middle East due to the need for locals to interact with expatriate workers. Modern Standard Arabic has been noted for incorporating new speech reporting styles (ways of quoting other people's words) due to Englishisation. The Turkish language has become more open to English influences due to Turkey's Westernisation in the early 20th century and adoption of the Latin alphabet.

Because English is among the most common languages in Israel, it has also influenced Modern Hebrew, though it has less presence in the Arab areas. English's role in Israel became more prevalent with the 1967 Six-Day War and later cultural Americanisation.

=== Europe ===
The initial spread of the English language took place with continental Europeans who conquered England. England then spread the language through the rest of the British Isles, sometimes through conquest.

Some languages in Europe, such as some of the Scandinavian languages, have been prone to significant Englishisation, while other languages, such as Icelandic, have tended towards linguistic purism. The similarity and long-standing history of English having connections with Western European languages has played a role in its modern-day influence on them, and has resulted in altered interpretations of English words in some cases. Englishisation has occurred to some extent particularly in the business and finance-related vocabularies of various European languages. Some impacts of Englishisation have worn off over time, as Englishisation sometimes takes place in a way that is too "trendy" and which does not become well-absorbed into a given language.

There is also research around the increasing usage of English in European universities.

=== Oceania ===
Several English-based creoles were formed in Oceania during the colonial period, with even the English spoken in British colonies such as Australia and New Zealand mixing with local languages. In modern times, the appeal of Australia and New Zealand has served to bolster the English language in the region.

== See also ==
- Anglicism
  - Pseudo-anglicism
- Translanguaging
- Westernization
  - Americanization
  - Francization
- International scientific vocabulary
