= List of Sanskrit, Arabic and Persian roots in Hindi =

The following is an alphabetical (according to Hindi's alphabet) list of Sanskrit, Arabic and Persian roots, stems, prefixes, and suffixes commonly used in Hindi.

== अ (') ==
Root	English Equivalent	Origin language	Etymology	Hindi examples
अग्नि- (agni-)	pyro-, ignite(Latin)-	Sanskrit	अग्नि (fire)	अग्निशामक (agniśāmak) = fire extinguisher; अग्निरोधक (agnirōdhak) = fire-proof; अग्निभीति (agnibhīti) = pyrophobia
-अणु (-aṇu)		Sanskrit	अणु (minute, particle, atomic)	प्राणु (prāṇu) = proton; धनाणु (dhanāṇu) = positron; विषाणु (viṣāṇu) = virus
अति- (ati-)	super-	Sanskrit	अति (extremely, beyond, over)	अतिकाल (atikāl) = delay
अधि- (adhi-)	epi-, meta-	Sanskrit	अधि (over, above, upon, after)	अधिकार (adhikār) = rights, authority
अन- (an-), अ- (a-)	non-, un-, a-, an-	Sanskrit	अन-, अ- (not, without)	अकारण (akāraṇ) = causeless, unprovoked; अनादर (anaadar) = disrespect
अनु- (anu-)		Sanskrit	अनु (along, orderly, accordingly)	अनुक्रम (anukram) = sequence
अंतः- (antaḥ-)	inter-, endo-	Sanskrit	अंतः (in, inside)	अंतःकरण (antaḥkaraṇ) = conscience
अंतर- (antar-)	inter-	Sanskrit	अंतर् (in the middle, internal, amongst, within)	अंतर्राष्ट्रीय (antarrāṣtrīya) = international
अप- (ap-)	ab-	Sanskrit	अप (away, off)	अपमान (apmān) = insult
अभि- (abhi-)	ambi-/ἀμφί-	Sanskrit	अभि (to, towards, into, over, upon)	अभिज्ञान (abhijñyān) = recognition, identification
अम्ल- (aml-)	acid-	Sanskrit	अम्ल (acid)	अम्लप्रेमी(amlapremī) = acidophile
अंश- (aṃś-)		Sanskrit	अंश (part, portion)	अंशकालिक (amśakālik) = part-time; अंशांकन (amśānkan) = calibration
-अर्बुद (arbud)	-oma, onco-	Sanskrit	अर्बुद (tumor, swelling)	लसीकार्बुद (lasīkārbud) = lymphoma; अर्बुदविज्ञान (arbudvijñān) = oncology
अव- (av-)		Sanskrit	अव (down, off, away)	अवरोध (avarodh) = barrier, inhibition; अवगुण (avguṇ) = failing, fault, demerit
अर्ध- (ardha-)	semi-, demi-,	Sanskrit	अर्ध (half)	अर्धचालक (ardhachālak) = semiconductor; अर्धपारगम्य (ardhapārgamya) = semipermeable
अष्ट- (aṣṭa-)	octo-	Sanskrit	अष्ट (eight)	अष्टकोण (aṣṭakōṇ) = octagon; अष्टपदी (aṣṭapadī) = octave; अष्टभुज (aṣṭabhuj) = octopus
आत्म- (ātma-)	auto-, self-	Sanskrit	आत्मा (self)	आत्महत्या (ātmahatyā) = suicide; आत्मज्ञान (ātmajñān) = self-knowledge; आत्मकथा (ātmakathā) = autobiography
-आना (-ānā)	Adjective-forming. -ish, -ous, -ly.	Persian	انه (âneh)	दोस्ताना (dostānā) = friendly; फ़क़ीराना (faqīrānā) = austere, ascetic.
आप-/अप- (aap-/ap-)	aqua-	Sanskrit	आप (water)	अप्सरा; अब्ज
आब- (aab-)	aqua-	Persian	آب (aab) (water)	आबखोरा (ābkhorā) = mug, pot; आबहवा (ābhavā) = climate; पंजाब (Panjāb) = Punjab (Land of five Rivers)
उद- (ud-)	hydro-	Sanskrit	उद (water)	उदजन (udjan) = hydrogen
उभय- (ubhaya-)	ambi-, amphi-	Sanskrit	उभय (both)	उभयभावी (ubhayabhāvī) = ambivalent; उभयलिंगी (ubhayalingī) = bisexual; उभयचर (ubhayachar) = amphibian
उप- (up-)	sub-	Sanskrit	उप (below, subsidiary, towards)	उपवन (upvan) = orchard, park; उपमार्ग (upmārg) = bypass, side street; उपमहाद्वीप (upmahādvīp) = subcontinent
ऋक्ष- (ṛikṣ-)	urs-	Sanskrit	ऋक्ष (bear)	लघु सप्तर्षि (Ursa Minor)
एक- (ek-)	uni-, mono-	Sanskrit	एक (one)	एकभाषी (ekbhāṣī) = monolingual; एकपक्षीय (ekpakśīya) = unilateral; एकवर्णी (ekvarnī) = monochromatic

== क (k) ==
कम- (kam-)	min-	Persian	کم (kam) (low, little, small)	कमज़ोर (kamzor) = weak
कठ- (kath-), काठ- (kāth-)	xylo-	Sanskrit	काष्ठ (kāṣth) (timber, wood)	कठफोड़वा (kathphodvā) = woodpecker; काठमांडू (kāthmānḍū) = Kathmandu
काष्ठ- (kāṣt-)	xylo-	Sanskrit	काष्ठ (timber, wood)	काष्ठवाद्य (kāṣthavādya) = xylophone, काष्ठशर्करा (kāṣṭhaśarkarā) = xylose
-काय (-kāya)	-some, -soma	Sanskrit	काय (Body)	लयनकाय (layankāya) = lysosome; कायिक (kāyik) = somatic
-कोण (-koṇa)	-gon	Sanskrit	कोण (corner, angle)	त्रिकोण (trikoṇa) = triangle; षट्कोण (ṣaṭkoṇa) = hexagon

== ख़ (x) ==
ख़ुद- (xud-)	auto-, sui-	Persian	خود (xwad) (self, own, ego)	ख़ुदग़रज़ी (khudgarzī) = selfishness
ख़ुश- (xuś-)	good-, eu-	Persian	خوش (xwaš) (good)	ख़ुशनसीब (xuśnasīb) = fortunate; ख़ुशफ़हमी (khuśfahmī) = fantasy (lit. good understanding)
ख़ून- (xūn-)		Persian	خون (xūn) (blood, gore)	ख़ूँखार(xū̃xār) = bloodthirsty

== ग (g) ==
गाव- (gaav-)	Persian	گاو (gaav) (cow)	गावशुमारी (gaavśumārī) = cow census
गो- (go-)	Sanskrit	गो (cow)	गोविन्द (govind) = cow herder

== ग़ (ġ) ==
ग़ैर- (ġair-)	non-	Arabic	غير (ghayr) (non-, un-)	ग़ैरमुल्की (ġairmulkī) = foreigner, non-native

== च (c) ==
चल- (chal-)	Sanskrit	चल (moving)	चलचित्र (chalchitra) = movie, motion picture
चित्र- (chitra-)	Sanskrit	चित्र (picture)	चित्रयंत्र (citrayantra) = camera

== छ (ch) ==
छद्म- (chhadm-)	pseudo-	Sanskrit	छद्म (deceptive)	छद्मावरण (chhadmāvaraṇ) = camouflage

== ज (j) ==
-जन (-jan)	-gen	Sanskrit	जन (generating)	उदजन (Udjan) = Hydrogen; तुषारजन (Tuṣārjan) = cryogen
जल- (jal-)	aqua-	Sanskrit	जल (water)	जलसेतु (jalsetu) = aqueduct
जीव- (jīva-)	bio-	Sanskrit	जीव (life, living)	जीवविज्ञान (jīvavijñān) = biology; जीवतत्व (jīvatatva) = physiology; जीवाणु (jīvānu) = bacteria
जन- (jan-)		Sanskrit	जन (people)	जनगणना (jangaṇanā) = census; जनसंख्या (jansankhyā) = population; जनरञ्जक (janrañjak) = popular
-ज़दा (-zadā)	Adjective forming, denoting "stricken, afflicted"	Persian	زده (beaten, hit)	मुसीबतज़दा = (musībatzadā) = disaster-stricken; हैरतज़दा = (hairatzadā) = awestruck

== त (t) ==
ताप- (tāp-)		Sanskrit	ताप (heat, fever)	तापमान (tāpmān) = temperature
तारा- (tārā-)	stell-	Sanskrit	तारा (star)	तारामीन (tārāmīn) = starfish
तुषार- (tuṣār)	cryo-	Sanskrit	तुषार (cold, ice, frigid)	तुषाराच्छादन (tuṣārācchādan) = frosting
तृण- (tṛṇ)		Sanskrit	तृण (grass, straw, herb)	तृणमणि (tṛiṇmaṇi) = amber

== द (d) ==
दंश- (danś-)		Sanskrit	दंश (bite)	उपदंशक्षत (upadanśakṣat) = hard chancre
-दान (-dān)		Sanskrit	दान (donation, charity)	रक्तदान (raktdān) = blood donation; भिक्षादान = (bhikṣādān) = charity, alms-giving; मतदान (matdān) = vote, poll
दिल- (dil-)		Persian	دل (dil) (heart)	दिलचस्पी (dilcaspī) = interest, zeal
-दार (-dār)	adjective-forming suffix, denoting "having, possessing"	Persian	دار (having)	ईमानदार (īmāndār) = honest; ज़िम्मेदार = (zimmedār) = responsible, held-accountable
दूर- (dūr-)	tele-	Sanskrit	दूर (far, distant)	दूरदर्शन (dūrdarśan) = television; दूरबीन (dūrbīn) = binoculars; दूरभाष (dūrbhāṣ) = telephone; दूरदर्शक (dūrdarśak) = Telescope
द्रुत- (drut-)		Sanskrit	द्रुत (rapid)	द्रुतगति (drutgati) = high-speed; द्रुतगामी (drutgāmī) = express
द्वि- (dvi-)	bi-, di-	Sanskrit	द्वि (two)	द्विकोणीय (dvikōṇīya) = biangular; द्विध्रुव (dvidhruv) = dipole
दो- (do-)	bi-, di-	Sanskrit	द्वि (two)	दोगुना (dogunā) = double; दोहरा (doharā) = duplex; दोपहर (dopahar) = midday, noon

== ध (dh) ==
ध्वनि- (dhvani-)	phon-, son-	Sanskrit	ध्वनि (tune, sound)	ध्वनीलेख (dhvanīlekh) = phonograph

== न (n) ==
नाय- (nāy-)		Sanskrit	नाय (guide, leader, direction)	नायकत्व (nāykatva) = leadership; नायक (nāyak) = hero; नायिका (nāyikā) = heroine (feminine of hero)
निद्रा- (nidrā-)	somn-	Sanskrit	निद्रा (sleep)	निद्राजनक (nidrājanak) = soporific, somniferous
निम्न- (nimn-)	min-	Sanskrit	निम्न (low, less, depressed)	निम्नलिखित (nimnalikhit) = following
-नाक (-nāk)	adjective-forming suffix, denoting "full of"	Persian		दर्दनाक (dardnāk) = painful; ख़ौफ़नाक (khaufnāk)= terrifying, fearsome

== प (p) ==
पाण्डुर- (pāndur-)	flav-	Sanskrit	पाण्डुर (yellow)	पाण्डुरविषाणु (pāṇdurviṣāṇu) = Flavivirus
पीत- (pīt-)	xanth-	Sanskrit	पीत (yellow)	पीतार्बुद (pītārbud) = xanthoma
पुरा- (purā-)	archae-, arche-	Sanskrit	पुरा (of old, long ago)	पुरातत्त्व (purātattva) = archaeology
पूति- (pūti-)		Sanskrit	पूति (stink, putrid)	पूतिता (pūtitā) sepsis, पूतिजीवरक्तता (pūtijīvaraktatā) = septicemia
पूर्व- (pūrv-)	ante-, pre-	Sanskrit	पूर्व (early, previous, former)	मृत्युपूर्व (mrutyupūrva) = antemortem
पेशाब- (peśāb-)	ur-, uro-	Persian	پیشاب (peśāb) (urine)	पेशाबघर (peśābghar) = urinal
प्रजा- (prajā-)	dem-	Sanskrit	प्रजा (man, mankind)	प्रजानायक (prajānāyak) = demagogue
प्रति- (prati-)	anti-	Sanskrit	प्रति (back, against, opposite)	प्रतिजैविक (pratijaivik) = antibiotic; प्रतिलघुगणक (pratilaghugaṇak) = antilogarithm
परम- (param-)		Sanskrit	परम (absolute, utmost, highest)	परमात्मा (paramātmā) = god, supreme being; परमाणु (paramāṇu) = atom
-पाद (-pād)	-pod	Sanskrit	पाद (foot, quarter)	द्विपाद (dvipād) = biped; संधिपाद (sandhipād) = arthropod
पार- (pār-)	trans-	Sanskrit	पार (crossing, opposite side)	पारलैंगिक (pārlaingik) = transsexual; पारदर्शक (pārdarśak) = transparent; पारवहन (pārvahan) = transit

== फ (ph) ==
फल- (phal-)	fruct-, frug-	Sanskrit	फल (fruit)	फलदायक (phaldāyak) = available; फलधु (phaladhu), फलशर्करा (phalśarkarā) = fructose

== ब (b) ==
बा- (baa-)		Persian	با (baa) (with)	बाक़ायदा (bāqāydā) = methodically (lit. by the principles);
बर्फ़- (barf-)	glaci-	Persian	برف (barf) (ice)	बर्फानी (barfānī) = blizzard
बाष्प- (bāṣp-)	vap-	Sanskrit	बाष्प (vapor, steam)	बाष्पातु (bāṣpātu) = rhenium
बे- (be-)		Persian	بی (be) (without)	बेतार (betār) = wireless; बेशुमार (beśumār) = uncountable, innumerable
-बीन (-bīn)	-scope	Persian		दूरबीन (dūrbīn) = binoculars; खुर्दबीन (khurdbīn) = microscope

== भ (bh) ==
भीति- (bhīti-)	phobia-	Sanskrit	भीति (fear)	अग्निभीति (agnibhīti) = pyrophobia; जलभीति (jalabhīti) = Aquaphobia
-भुज (-bhuja)		Sanskrit	भुज (hand, arm, side)	अष्टभुज (aṣtabhuja) = octagon, eight-armed

== म (m) ==
मल- (mal-)	mal-	Sanskrit	मल (dirt, impurity)	मलोत्सर्ग (malotsarg) = bowel movement; मलावरोध (malāvarodh) = constipation
मांस- (mā̃s-)	carn-	Sanskrit	मांस (flesh, meat)	मांसाहारी (mā̃sāhaarī) = carnivore
मार्ग- (mārg-)		Sanskrit	मार्ग (road, passage)	राजमार्ग (rājmārg) = highway
मूत्र- (mūtr-)	ur-, uro-	Sanskrit	मूत्र (urine)	मूत्रविज्ञान (mūtravinyān) = urology; मूत्राशय (mūtrāśay) = bladder
मेघ- (megh-)		Sanskrit	मेघ (cloud)	मेघधनुष (meghdhanuṣ) = rainbow
मृद- (mṛid-)		Sanskrit	मृद (loam, clay, soil)	मृदभक्षण (mṛidbhakṣaṇ) = geophagy
-मंद (-mand)	adjective-forming suffix, denoting possession	Persian		अक़्लमंद (aqlmand) = wise; दौलतमंद (daulatmand) = wealthy
मनो (mano-)	psycho-	Sanskrit	मन (thought, view, imaginary)	मनोविज्ञान (manovijñān) = psychology; मनोदशा (manodaśā) = mood
महा- (mahā-)	mega-	Sanskrit	मह (great, mighty)	महात्मा (mahātmā) = saint; महारानी (mahārānī) = empress
मेरु- (meru-)		Sanskrit	मेरु (spinal)	मेरुदण्ड (merudanḍa) = spinal column; मेरुरज्जु (merurajju) = spinal cord; मेरुनाल (merunāl) = spinal canal

== य (y) ==
यव- (yav-)	Sanskrit	यव (barley)	यवसुरा (yavsurā) = ale

== र (r) ==
रक्त- (rakt-)	hem-, haem-	Sanskrit	रक्त (blood)	रक्तविज्ञान (raktavinyān) = hematology, रक्तला (raktalā) = erbium

== ल (l) ==
ला- (lā-)	-less, used for negation	Arabic	لا (no)	लापरवाह (lāparvāh) = carefree, careless; लाजवाब (lājavāb) = matchless, unequalled; लापता (lāpatā) = missing
लाप- (lāp-)		Sanskrit	लाप (speaking, speech)	संलाप (samlāp) = discourse; आलाप (ālāp) = dialogue
लोक- (lok-)		Sanskrit	लोक (people, public, human race)	लोकतंत्र (loktantra) = democracy; लोकप्रिय (lokpriya) = popular; लोकसभा (loksabhā) = House of Commons

== व (v) ==
वायु- (vāyu-)	aer—as-	Sanskrit	वायु (gas)	वायुगतिकी (vāyugatikī) = aerodynamics
वृष- (vriṣabh-)	taur—os-	Sanskrit	वृष (bull)	नरवृषभ (narvriṣabh) = Minotaur—os
विद्युत्‌- (vidyut-)		Sanskrit	विद्युत (electricity)	विद्युत चुम्बकीय (vidyutchumbakīya) = electromagnetic; विद्युदणु (vidyudaṇu) = electron
वित्त- (vitta-)		Sanskrit	वित्त (wealth, money, finance)	वित्तमंत्री (vittamantrī) = finance minister; वित्तदाता (vittadātā) = financer

== श (ś) ==
शति- (śati-)	centi-	Sanskrit	शत (hundred)	शतिमान (śatimān) = centimeter
शत- (śata-)	hecto-	Sanskrit	शत (hundred)	शतमान (śatamān) = hectometre
शिला- (śilā-)	petro-	Sanskrit	शिला (stone)	शिलातैल (śilātail) = petroleum; शिलाचित्र (śilācitra) = petroglyph
शीत- (śit-)	cryo-	Sanskrit	शीत (cold, frigid)	शीतागार (śitāgār) = cold storage; शीतदंश (śitdanś) = frostbite
शुष्क- (śuṣk-)	xer-	Sanskrit	शुष्क (dry)	शुष्काक्षिपाक (śuṣkākṣipāk) = xerophthalmia
श्याम- (śyām-)		Sanskrit	श्याम (black)	श्यामपट्ट (śyāmpatt) = blackboard

== स (s) ==
सद- (sad-)	sed-, -sid-, sess-	Sanskrit	सद (sitting)	सदन (sadan) = assembly, tenement
सर्व- (sarv-)	salv-	Sanskrit	सर्व (whole, each, entire, all)	सर्वश्रेष्ठ (sarvaśreṣth) = foremost, ace, ultimate
सह- (sah-)	con-, co-, col-, com-, cor-	Sanskrit	सह (with)	सहपक्ष (sahpakṣ) = aileron
स्था- (sthā-)		Sanskrit	स्था (stand)	स्थानान्तरण (sthānāntaraṇ) = transfer, shift
स्मृ- (smri-)	memor-	Sanskrit	स्मृ (remember)	स्मृती (smritī) = remembrance
स्फट- (sphat-)		Sanskrit	स्फट (crystal)	द्विस्फटिक (dvisphatik) = macle; स्फटयातु (sphatayātu) = aluminum
स्व- (sva-)	auto-	Sanskrit	स्व (self, own)	स्वाभिमान (svābhimān) = self-respect
सु - (su-)	eu-	Sanskrit		सुभाग्य (subhāgya) = good-fortune; सुस्वर = (susvar) = euphonious
सहस्र- (sahasra-)	kilo-	Sanskrit	सहस्र (thousand)	सहस्रमान (sahasramān) = kilometre
सहस्रि- (sahasri-)	milli-	Sanskrit	सहस्र (thousand)	सहस्रिमान (sahasrimān) = millimetre
सूक्ष्म- (sūkṣma-)	micro-	Sanskrit	सूक्ष्म (minute, fine)	सूक्ष्मदर्शी (sūkṣmadarśī) = microscope; सूक्ष्मतरंग (sūkṣmatarang) = microwave; सूक्ष्मजीव (sūkṣmajīv) = micro-organism
-सरट (-saraṭ)	-saur	Sanskrit	सरट (lizard)	भीमसरट (bhīmsaraṭ) = dinosaur; त्रिशृंगसरट (triśringasaraṭ) = triceratops; वर्मसरट (varmasaraṭ) = stegosaurus

== ह (h) ==
हम- (ham-)	fellow, co-, sym-	Persian	هم (ham) (fellow, kindred)	हमवतन (hamvatan) = compatriot; हमदर्द (hamdard) = sympathy (lit. kindred pain)
हिम- (him-)	glaci-	Sanskrit	हिम (ice, snow)	हिमनद (himnad) = glacier
-हीन (-hīn)		Sanskrit	हीन (poor, without)	शक्तिहीन (śaktihīn) = powerless; भावनाहीन (bhāvnāhīn) = emotionless
हरित- (harit-)	chloro-	Sanskrit	हरित (green)	हरितलवक (haritlavak) = chloroplast; पर्णहरित (parnaharit) = chlorophyll
