= Sanskritisation (linguistics) =

Sanskrit influence on other languages

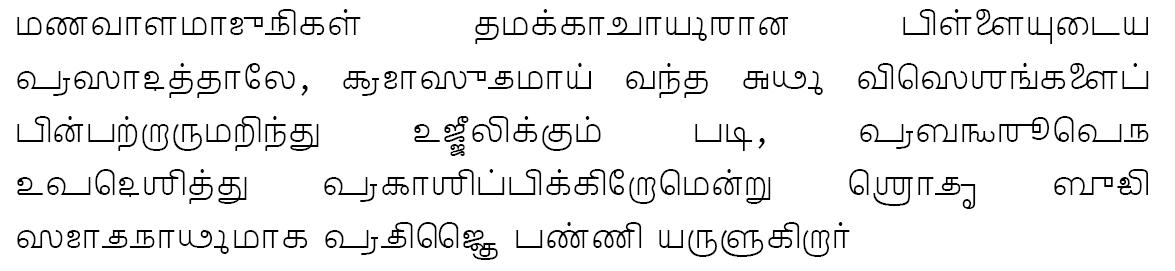
Manipravalam, a heavily Sanskritised style of Tamil, written in Tamil-Grantha script.

Sanskritisation is the process of introducing features from Sanskrit, such as vocabulary and grammar, into other languages. It is sometimes associated with the "Hinduisation" of a linguistic community. Many languages throughout South Asia and Southeast Asia were greatly influenced by Sanskrit (or its descendant languages, the Prakrits and modern-day Indo-Aryan languages) historically.

Sanskritisation often stands in opposition to the Persianisation or Englishisation of a language within South Asia, as occurs with the Hindustani language, which in its Sanskritised, Persianised, and English-influenced registers becomes Hindi, Urdu, and Hinglish/Urdish respectively. Support for Sanskritisation in South Asia runs highest among Hindu nationalists.

Sanskritisation of the names of people and places is also commonplace in India.

== History ==
=== Ancient era ===
For nearly 2,000 years, Sanskrit was the language of a cultural order that exerted influence across South Asia, Inner Asia, Southeast Asia, and to a certain extent East Asia. A significant form of post-Vedic Sanskrit is found in the Sanskrit of Indian epic poetry—the Ramayana and Mahabharata. The deviations from Pāṇini in the epics are generally considered to be on account of interference from Prakrits, or innovations, and not because they are pre-Paninian. Traditional Sanskrit scholars call such deviations ārṣa (आर्ष), meaning 'of the ṛṣis', the traditional title for the ancient authors. In some contexts, there are also more "prakritisms" (borrowings from common speech) than in Classical Sanskrit proper. Buddhist Hybrid Sanskrit is a literary language heavily influenced by the Middle Indo-Aryan languages, based on early Buddhist Prakrit texts which subsequently assimilated to the Classical Sanskrit standard in varying degrees.

=== Modern era ===
During the medieval era, the Indian languages had taken in a lot of Perso-Arabic influences as a result of Muslim invasions, particularly in the northwestern subcontinent; colonial-era education policies, religious nationalism, and the influence of some of the more Sanskritised Indian languages played a role in Hindus and Muslims increasingly separating in terms of their linguistic influences, with Hindus tending towards the usage of Sanskrit words and the Brahmic Devanagari script for writing Hindi while Muslims opting for a more Perso-Arabic vocabulary and the Nastaliq Arabic script for writing Urdu.

Since the 1947 Partition of India, the Indian government, which at one point considered making Sanskrit the national language, instead has sought to further Sanskritise Hindi, considering it to be easier for Indians to learn, and as a way of distancing Hindi from the Urdu spoken in the newly formed country of Pakistan (though Urdu continues to have official status in several Indian states, such as Uttar Pradesh). Sanskrit has been used to form new words to describe modern concepts and technologies in several South Asian languages by forming calques based on English words. In addition, Sanskrit words that have been nativised into other languages have been mixed with words from other language families, such as the Dravidian languages, to form new words.

Cultural debates have emerged over how much Sanskrit should appear in Hindi and how acceptable Persian and English influences should be, with Hindu nationalists favouring Sanskritised Hindi, opposing Urdu in part because of its association with Islam, and some boycotting the Hindi-language Bollywood film industry for featuring too much Urdu and English vocabulary in its movies.

==== Example of different registers of Khariboli ====
Comparison of different modern Khariboli registers using the same sentence
Language	Sentence (in Latin script)	Remarks
English	The clouds of our country shower blessings on this land.	
Modern Standard Hindi	Hamārē rāṣṭra kē mēgh is bhūmi par vardān varṣātē ha͠i. (Devanagari: हमारे राष्ट्र के मेघ इस भूमि पर वरदान वर्षाते हैं।)	Highly Sanskritised variety with tatsama vocabulary (although MSH does also employ native tadbhava vocabulary as well), generally preferred for formal purposes by followers of Dharmic religions, Sanskritists and linguistic purists and puritanists alike.
Hindustani	Hamārē dēs kā bādal is dhartī par vardān/barkat barsātē ha͠i.	Colloquial variety with native tadbhava vocabulary, with a substantial number of loanwords from both tatsama vocabulary, as well as from Persian and Arabic (and to some extent, even Turkic), as seen (to some extent) in Ganga-Jamuni tehzeeb.
Hinglish/Urdish	Hamārē country kē clouds is land par blessings shower kartē ha͠i.	Heavy code-mixing with English words and phrases.
Standard Urdu	Hamārē mulk ke abr is zamīn par raḥmat nāzil kartē ha͠i. (Nastaliq: ہمارے ملک کے ابر اس زمین پر رحمت نازل کرتے ہیں۔)	Highly Persianised and Arabised variety, mostly preferred for formal purposes by followers of Islam and people in a Persianate culture and setting.

== De-Sanskritisation ==
The de-Sanskritisation of Tamil started during the 1950s following the popularization of Dravidianism. These attempts at "de-sanskritization" came to see the language having altered to remove a lot of the Sanskrit borrowing.

The Hela Havula movement advocated de-Sanskritisation of the Sinhala language.

== See also ==
- Sanskrit revival
- Sanskritism
- Prestige (sociolinguistics)
- Linguistic purism

== Sources ==
- Oberlies, Thomas (2003). A Grammar of Epic Sanskrit. Berlin New York: Walter de Gruyter. ISBN 978-3-11-014448-2.
- Pollock, Sheldon (2001). "The Death of Sanskrit". Comparative Studies in Society and History. 43 (2). Cambridge University Press: 392–426. JSTOR 2696659. S2CID 35550166.
