= Sanskritism =

Neologisms coined from Sanskrit

Sanskritism is a term used to indicate words that are coined out of Sanskrit for modern usage in the republics of India, Nepal, Bangladesh, Sri Lanka and elsewhere. They are often formed as calques of English words and serve as neologisms. These terms are similar in nature to taxon terms coined from Latin and Greek.

== See also ==
- Sanskritisation (language)
