= Zee Russia =

Zee TV Russia
- Country: Russia
- Broadcast area: Russia
- Headquarters: Moscow, Russia

Programming
- Language: Russian
- Picture format: 576i (16:9 SDTV)

Ownership
- Owner: Zee Entertainment Enterprises

History
- Launched: 14 July 2007; 18 years ago

Links
- Website: www.zee-tv.ru

Zee TV is a general entertainment channel in Russian launched in July 2007. Zee TV Russia airs Zee TV and &TV series dubbed into Russian and movies from Bollywood. Its target audience is the Indian diaspora.

== Television programs ==
- Agent Raghav – Crime Branch (Agent Raghav)
- Chotti Bahu 2 (GOD Given)
- Buddha (Buddha)
- Fear Files: Darr Ki Sacchi Tasvirein (In The Power of Fear)
- Punar Vivah (The second wedding)
- Do Dil Bandhe Ek Dori Se (Two Hearts, One Fate)
- Jodha Akbar (Jodha and Akbar: The Story of Great Love)
- Yahan Ke Hum Sikandar (Road to Life)
- Aapki Antara (Other)
- Kumkum Bhagya (Female Share)
- Khelti Hai Zindagi Aankh Micholi (Life Is Full of Surprises)
- Tashan-e-Ishq (Forbidden Love)
- Rabba Ishq Na Hove (Evil Love)
- Ek Thi Rajkumaari (The Golden Cage)
- Jhansi Ki Rani (Queen Jhansi)
- Pyaar Tune Kya Kiya (Love The Whole Cause)
- Do Saheliyaan (Puppets of Fate)
- Connected Hum Tum (We Are Women!)
- Parvaaz (On the verge)
- Banoo Main Teri Dulhann (Daughter in Law)
- Kasamh Se (Promise)
- Ek Tha Raja Ek Thi Rani (One King One Queen)
- Simply Sapney (Simple Dreams)
- Sanjog Se Bani Sangini (Random Love)
- Qubool Hai (Consent)
- Bhabi Ji Ghar Par Hai! (Neighbor, Are You At Home?)
- Razia Sultan (Sultan Razia)
- Jhoome Jiiya Re (I Want To Dance)
- Dil Se Diya Vachan (The Keeper of The Hearth)
- Ardhangini (A Pure Soul)
- Sapne Suhane Ladakpan Ke (The Young Years Are Wonderful)
- Yahaaan Main Ghar Ghar Kheli (I Grew Up Here)
