= Abhidhana =

An abhidhāna (Sanskrit: अभिधान, IPA: [ɐbʱɪdʱaːnɐ]) is a kind of dictionary or vocabulary of Sanskrit. Its purpose was to be used as a general guide for lexicography and word choice. Many of these works had been created in India. One of the oldest of them is the Abhidhana ratna - mala, of Halayudha Bhatta of the 7th century. The Abhidhana Chinta-mani of Hema-chandra, a celebrated Jaina writer of the 13th century, is often mentioned as among the best.

The sixty-four kalas (fine arts and crafts) as mentioned by Ancient Indians include "Abhidhana kosa cando jnana" or the use of lexicography and meters as one of them.
