= Tadbhava =

Sanskrit borrowings with modified phonologies

Tadbhava (Sanskrit: तद्भव, IPA: [tɐdbʱɐʋɐ], lit. 'arising from that') is the Sanskrit word for one of three etymological classes defined by native grammarians of Middle Indo-Aryan languages, alongside tatsama and deśi words. A "tadbhava" is a word with an Indo-Aryan origin (and thus related to Sanskrit) but which has evolved through language change in the Middle Indo-Aryan stage and eventually inherited into a modern Indo-Aryan language. In this sense, tadbhavas can be considered the native (inherited) vocabulary of modern Indo-Aryan languages.

Tadbhavas are distinguished from tatsamas, a term applied to words borrowed from Classical Sanskrit after the development of the Middle Indo-Aryan languages; tatsamas thus retain their Sanskrit form (at least orthographically). This can be compared to the use of borrowed Classical Latin vocabulary in modern Romance languages. Both tadbhavas and tatsamas are also distinguished from deśi ("local") words, a term applied to words that have a non-Indo-Aryan source, typically Dravidian, Austroasiatic, or Tibeto-Burman. In the modern context, the terms "tadbhava" and "tatsama" are applied to Sanskrit loanwords not only in Indo-Aryan languages, but also in Dravidian, Munda and other South Asian language families.

== Tadbhavas in Indo-Aryan languages ==
Modern Indo-Aryan languages have two classes of words inherited from Sanskrit. The first covers words that have come to the languages from Old Indo-Aryan through Prakrit and Apabhraṃśa; they are the inherited tadbhava words and show an unbroken chain of language evolution from Old Indo-Aryan to the modern form. A second class of Sanskrit-derived words in modern Indo-Aryan languages covers words that have their origin in Classical Sanskrit and were originally borrowed into Prakrit or Apabhraṃśa as tatsamas but, over the course of time, changed in form to fit the phonology of the recipient language. Such words are often called ardhatatsamas or semi-tatsamas by modern linguists. These stand apart from the tatsamas, which have the same Devanagari spelling in both Sanskrit and the modern language.

Tadbhava, tatsama and semi-tatsama forms derived from the same Indo-Aryan root sometimes co-exist in modern Indo-Aryan languages. For example, the reflexes of śraddha in Bengali include Sanskrit borrowings in tatsama sroddha and semi-tatsama form chedda, in addition to the inherited tadbhava form šadh. Similarly, Sanskrit ājñā exists in Modern Standard Hindi as a semi-tatsama āgyā and an inherited tadbhava form ān (via Prakrit āṇa) in addition to the pure tatsama ājñā. In such cases, the use of tatsama forms in place of equivalent tadbhava or native forms is often seen by speakers of a language as a marker of a more chaste or literary form of the language, as opposed to a more rustic or colloquial form. Often, however, a word exists only in one of the three possible forms, that is only as a tadbhava, tatsama or semi-tatsama, or it has different meanings in different forms. For example, reflexes of the Old Indo-Aryan word hṛdaya exist in Hindi both as a tatsama and as a tadbhava. However, the tatsama word hṛdaya means "heart", as in Sanskrit, but the tadbhava hiyyā means "courage".

=== Tadbhavas in the Odia language ===
Odia words are divided into native words (desaja), those borrowed from Sanskrit (tatasam) and those adapted with little modification from Sanskrit (tatbhaba). The 17th-century dictionary Gitabhidhana by Upendra Bhanja, Sabda Tattva Abhidhana (1916) by Gopinath Nanda and Purnachandra Oriya Bhashakosha (1931) by GC Praharaj with 185,000 Words, Promoda Abhidan (1942) with 150,000 words by PC Deb and Damodara Mishar classified the Odia words as deśi, tatsama or tadbhava.

The Odia words are derived from Odia verbal roots, which are derived from Sanskrit verbal roots. The Odia words are called Tatabhaba Krudanta words. For example, kandana is derived from Odia dhatu kanda, which is derived from Sanskrit kranda dhatu.

== Tadbhavas in other South Asian languages ==
In the context of Dravidian, Austroasiatic, and Tibeto-Burman languages of South Asia, the terms "tatsama" and "tadbhava" are used to describe words which have been borrowed from Sanskrit either unmodified ("tatsama") or modified ("tadbhava"). Tadbhava as used in relation to these languages, therefore, corresponds more accurately with the categories of tatsama and semi-tatsama used in relation to the vocabulary of modern Indo-Aryan languages. All Dravidian languages contain a proportion of tadbhava and tatsama words, possibly exceeding over half of the vocabulary of literary Kannada and Telugu, with Malayalam being among the most in common with Sanskrit and Tamil having less Sanskrit than the other three.

== See also ==
- Indo-Aryan loanwords in Tamil
