= Hindi =

Indo-Aryan language

- Modern Standard Hindi
- हिन्दी, Hindī
- The word "Hindi" in Devanagari script
- Pronunciation: [ˈɦɪnd̪iː]
- Native to: India
- Region: Hindi Belt
- Speakers: L1: 345 million (Note: speakers of Hindi and various related languages who reported their language as 'Hindi') (2011 census); L2: 264 million (2020); Total: 610 million (2011–2020)
- Language family: Indo-European: Indo-Iranian; Indo-Aryan; Central Indo-Aryan; Western Hindi; Hindustani; Hindi
- Early forms: Shauraseni Prakrit: Apabhraṃśa; Old Hindi; Hindustani; Rekhta
- Writing system: Devanagari (official); Kaithi (historical); Mahajani (historical); Laṇḍā (historical); Devanagari Braille
- Signed forms: Indian Signing System

Official status
- Official language in: India; Andaman and Nicobar Islands; Bihar; Chandigarh; Chhattisgarh; Dadra and Nagar Haveli and Daman and Diu; Delhi; Gujarat; Haryana; Himachal Pradesh; Jammu and Kashmir; Jharkhand; Ladakh; Madhya Pradesh; Rajasthan; Uttar Pradesh; Uttarakhand; West Bengal (additional); Fiji (semi-official)
- Recognised minority language in: South Africa (protected language); United Arab Emirates (official court language); Mauritius (as a cultural language)
- Regulated by: Central Hindi Directorate

Language codes
- ISO 639-1: hi
- ISO 639-2: hin
- ISO 639-3: hin
- Glottolog: hind1269
- Linguasphere: 59-AAF-qf
- Distribution of L1 self-reported speakers of Hindi in India as per the 2011 Census

Modern Standard Hindi (Hindi: आधुनिक मानक हिन्दी, romanised: Ādhunik Mānak Hindī), commonly referred to as Hindi, is an Indo-Aryan language of the Indo-European language family, written in the Devanagari script. It is an official language of India and, alongside English, serves as a lingua franca across much of North, Central, East, Western, and Northeast India, with South India being the main exception.

Hindi is an official language in ten states (Bihar, Chhattisgarh, Gujarat, Haryana, Himachal Pradesh, Jharkhand, Madhya Pradesh, Rajasthan, Uttar Pradesh, and Uttarakhand), and six union territories (Andaman and Nicobar Islands, Delhi, Chandigarh, Dadra and Nagar Haveli and Daman and Diu, Ladakh, and Jammu and Kashmir) and an additional official language in the state of West Bengal. Hindi is also one of the 22 scheduled languages of the Republic of India.

Apart from the script and formal vocabulary, Modern Standard Hindi is mutually intelligible with standard Urdu. The common base or language of the two registers is referred to as Hindi–Urdu or Hindustani, with Hindi being considered the more Sanskritised register. Hindustani may also occur in simplified forms, sometimes referred to as Bazaar Hindustani; pidginised varieties include Haflong Hindi. Outside India, several other languages are recognised officially as "Hindi" but do not refer to the Standard Hindi language and instead descend from other nearby languages, such as Awadhi and Bhojpuri. Examples of this are Bhojpuri-Hindustani spoken in South Africa and Mauritius; Fiji Hindi spoken in Fiji; and Caribbean Hindustani spoken in Suriname, Trinidad and Tobago, and Guyana.

Hindi is the fourth-most-spoken first language in the world, after Mandarin, Spanish, and English. When grouped with the mutually intelligible Urdu, it is the third-most-spoken language in the world, after Mandarin and English. According to reports of Ethnologue (2025), Hindi is the third most-spoken language in the world when including first and second language speakers.

Hindi is the fastest-growing language of India, followed by Kashmiri, Meitei, Gujarati and Bengali, according to the 2011 census of India.

== Terminology ==
The term Hindī was originally used to refer to inhabitants of the Indo-Gangetic Plain. It was borrowed from Classical Persian هندی Hindī (Iranian Persian pronunciation: Hendi), meaning 'of or belonging to Hind (India)' (hence, 'Indian').

Another name Hindavī (ہندوی/हिन्दवी) (from Persian هندوی 'of or belonging to the Indian people') was often used in the past, for example, by Amir Khusrau in his poetry.

The terms Hindi and Hindu trace back to Old Persian, which derived these names from the Sanskrit name Sindhu (सिन्धु), referring to the Indus River. The Greek cognates of the same terms are Indus (for the river) and India (for the land of the river).

The term Modern Standard Hindi is commonly used to specifically refer to the modern literary Hindi language, as opposed to colloquial and regional varieties that are also referred to as Hindi in a wider sense.

== History ==
=== Middle Indo-Aryan to Hindi ===
Like other Indo-Aryan languages, Hindi is a direct descendant of an early form of Vedic Sanskrit (not to be confused with the later variety of Classical Sanskrit). This early variety transitioned in medieval India into Shauraseni Prakrit and Śauraseni Apabhraṃśa (from Sanskrit apabhraṃśa "corrupt"), which emerged in the 7th century CE.

The sound changes that characterised the transition from Middle Indo-Aryan to Hindi are:

- Compensatory lengthening of vowels preceding geminate consonants, sometimes with spontaneous nasalisation: Skt. hasta "hand" > Pkt. hattha > hāth
- Loss of all word-final vowels: rātri "night" > rattī > rāt
- Formation of nasalised long vowels from nasal consonants (-VNC- > -V̄̃C-): bandha "bond" > bā̃dh
- Loss of unaccented or unstressed short vowels (reflected in schwa deletion): susthira "firm" > sutthira > suthrā
- Collapsing of adjacent vowels (including separated by a hiatus: apara "other" > avara > aur
- Final -m to -ṽ: grāma "village" > gāma > gāṽ
- Intervocalic -ḍ- to -ṛ- or -l-: taḍāga "pond" > talāv, naḍa "reed" > nal.
- v > b: vivāha "marriage" > byāh

=== Hindustani ===
During the period of Delhi Sultanate in medieval India, which covered most of today's north India, eastern Pakistan, southern Nepal and Bangladesh and which resulted in the contact of Hindu and Muslim cultures, the Sanskrit and Prakrit base of Old Hindi became enriched with loanwords from Persian, evolving into the present form of Hindustani. Hindi achieved prominence in India after it became the official language of the imperial court during the reign of Shah Jahan. It is recorded that Emperor Aurangzeb spoke in Hindi. The Hindustani vernacular became an expression of Indian national unity during the Indian Independence movement, and continues to be spoken as the common language of the people of the northern Indian subcontinent, which is reflected in the Hindustani vocabulary of Bollywood films and songs.

Standard Hindi is based on the Khariboli dialect, spoken in the Ganges-Yamuna Doab (Delhi, Meerut, and Saharanpur); the vernacular of Delhi and the surrounding region gradually replaced earlier prestige languages such as Awadhi and Braj. Standard Hindi was developed by supplanting foreign loanwords from the Hindustani language and replacing them with Sanskrit words, though Standard Hindi does continue to possess several Persian loanwords. Modern Hindi became a literary language in the 19th century. Earliest examples could be found as Prēm Sāgar by Lallu Lal, Batiyāl Pachīsī of Sadal Misra, and Rānī Kētakī Kī Kahānī of Insha Allah Khan which were published in Devanagari script during the early 19th century.

John Gilchrist was principally known for his study of the Hindustani language, which was adopted as the lingua franca of northern India (including what is now present-day Pakistan) by Britons and Indians alike. He compiled and authored An English-Hindustani Dictionary, A Grammar of the Hindoostanee Language, The Oriental Linguist, and many more. His lexicon of Hindustani was published in the Perso-Arabic script, Nāgarī script, and in Roman transliteration. In the late 19th century, a movement to further develop Hindi as a standardised form of Hindustani separate from Urdu took form. In 1881, Bihar accepted Hindi as its sole official language, replacing Urdu, and thus became the first state of India to adopt Hindi. However, in 2014, Urdu was accorded second official language status in the state.

=== Independent India ===
On 14 September 1949, the Constituent Assembly of India adopted Hindi written in the Devanagari script as the official language of the Republic of India replacing the previous usage of Hindustani in the Perso-Arabic script in the British Indian Empire. To this end, several stalwarts rallied and lobbied pan-India in favour of Hindi, most notably Beohar Rajendra Simha along with Hazari Prasad Dwivedi, Kaka Kalelkar, Maithili Sharan Gupt and Seth Govind Das who even debated in Parliament on this issue. As such, on the 50th birthday of Beohar Rajendra Simha on 14 September 1949, the efforts came to fruition following the adoption of Hindi as the official language. Now, it is celebrated as Hindi Day.

== Official status ==
=== India ===
Part XVII of the Indian Constitution deals with the official language of the Indian Union. Under Article 343, the official languages of the Union have been prescribed, which includes Hindi in Devanagari script and English:

(1) The official language of the Union shall be Hindi in Devanagari script. The form of numerals to be used for the official purposes of the Union shall be the international form of Indian numerals.
(2) Notwithstanding anything in clause (1), for a period of fifteen years from the commencement of this Constitution, the English language shall continue to be used for all the official purposes of the Union for which it was being used immediately before such commencement: Provided that the President may, during the said period, by order authorise the use of the Hindi language in addition to the English language and of the Devanagari form of numerals in addition to the international form of Indian numerals for any of the official purposes of the Union.

It was envisioned that Hindi would become the sole working language of the Union Government by 1965 (per directives in Article 344 (2) and Article 351), with state governments being free to function in the language of their own choice. However, widespread resistance to the imposition of Hindi on non-native speakers, especially in South India (such as those in Tamil Nadu) led to the passage of the Official Languages Act of 1963, which provided for the continued use of English indefinitely for all official purposes, although the constitutional directive for the Union Government to encourage the spread of Hindi was retained and has strongly influenced its policies.

Article 344 (2b) stipulates that the official language commission shall be constituted every ten years to recommend steps for the progressive use of Hindi language and impose restrictions on the use of the English language by the union government. In practice, the official language commissions are constantly endeavouring to promote Hindi but not imposing restrictions on English in official use by the union government.

At the state level, Hindi is the official language of the following Indian states: Bihar, Chhattisgarh, Haryana, Himachal Pradesh, Jharkhand, Madhya Pradesh, Rajasthan, Uttar Pradesh and Uttarakhand. Hindi is an official language of Gujarat, along with Gujarati. It acts as an additional official language of West Bengal in blocks and sub-divisions with more than 10% of the population speaking Hindi. Similarly, Hindi is accorded the status of official language in the following Union Territories: Delhi, Andaman and Nicobar Islands and Dadra and Nagar Haveli and Daman and Diu.

Although there is no specification of a national language in the constitution, it is a widely held belief that Hindi is the national language of India. This is often a source of friction and contentious debate. In 2010, the Gujarat High Court clarified that Hindi is not the national language of India because the constitution does not mention it as such.

=== Fiji ===
Hindi is an official language in Fiji as per the country's 1997 and 2013 constitutions. Two dialects of Hindi are spoken in Fiji: Standard Hindi and Fiji Hindi. The latter dialect traces its origins to Awadhi, an Eastern Hindi dialect. However, Standard Hindi is the official variant of Hindi recognised by the constitution and used in all official purposes, education, media, and businesses due to Fiji Hindi's lack of standardisation. Hindi is spoken by 380,000 people in Fiji.

=== Nepal ===
Hindi is spoken as a first language by about 77,569 people in Nepal according to the 2011 Nepal census, and further by 1,225,950 people as a second language. A Hindi proponent, Indian-born Paramananda Jha, was elected vice-president of Nepal. He took his oath of office in Hindi in July 2008. This created protests in the streets for 5 days; students burnt his effigies, and there was a general strike in 22 districts. Nepal Supreme Court ruled in 2009 that his oath in Hindi was invalid and he was kept "inactive" as vice-president. An "angry" Jha said, "I cannot be compelled to take the oath now in Nepali. I might rather take it in English."

=== South Africa ===
Hindi is a protected language in South Africa. According to the Constitution of South Africa, the Pan South African Language Board must promote and ensure respect for Hindi along with other languages. According to a doctoral dissertation by Rajend Mesthrie in 1985, although Hindi and other Indian languages have existed in South Africa for the last 125 years, there are no academic studies of any of them – of their use in South Africa, their evolution and current decline.

=== United Arab Emirates ===
Hindi was adopted as the third official court language in the Emirate of Abu Dhabi. As a result of this status, the Indian workforce in UAE can file their complaints to the labour courts in the country in their own mother-tongue.

== Geographical distribution ==
Hindi is the lingua franca of northern India (which contains the Hindi Belt), as well as an official language of the Government of India, along with English.

In Northeast India a pidgin known as Haflong Hindi has developed as a lingua franca for the people living in Haflong, Assam who speak other languages natively. In Arunachal Pradesh, Hindi emerged as a lingua franca among locals who speak over 50 dialects natively.

Hindi is quite easy to understand for many Pakistanis, who speak Urdu, which, like Hindi, is a standard register of the Hindustani language; additionally, Indian media are widely viewed in Pakistan.

A sizeable population in Afghanistan, especially in Kabul, can also speak and understand Hindi-Urdu due to the popularity and influence of Bollywood films, songs and actors in the region.

Hindi is also spoken by a large population of Madheshis (people having roots in north-India but having migrated to Nepal over hundreds of years) of Nepal. Apart from this, Hindi is spoken by the large Indian diaspora which hails from, or has its origin from the "Hindi Belt" of India. A substantially large North Indian diaspora lives in countries like the United States of America, the United Kingdom, the United Arab Emirates, Trinidad and Tobago, Guyana, Suriname, South Africa, Fiji and Mauritius, where it is natively spoken at home and among their own Hindustani-speaking communities.

Outside India, Hindi speakers are 8 million in Nepal; 863,077 in the United States of America; 450,170 in Mauritius; 380,000 in Fiji; 250,292 in South Africa; 150,000 in Suriname; 100,000 in Uganda; 45,800 in the United Kingdom; 20,000 in New Zealand; 20,000 in Germany; 26,000 in Trinidad and Tobago; 3,000 in Singapore.

== Comparison with Standard Urdu ==
Linguistically, Hindi and Urdu are two registers of the same language and are mutually intelligible. Both Hindi and Urdu share a core vocabulary of native Prakrit and Sanskrit-derived words. However, Hindi is written in the Devanagari script and contains more direct tatsama Sanskrit-derived words than Urdu, whereas Urdu is written in the Perso-Arabic script and uses more Arabic and Persian loanwords compared to Hindi. Because of this, as well as the fact that the two registers share an identical grammar, a consensus of linguists consider them to be two standardised forms of the same language, Hindustani or Hindi-Urdu. Hindi is the most commonly used scheduled language in India and is one of the two official languages of the union, the other being English. Urdu is the national language and lingua franca of Pakistan and is one of 22 scheduled languages of India, also having official status in Uttar Pradesh, Jammu and Kashmir, Delhi, Telangana, Andhra Pradesh and Bihar.

== Script ==
Hindi is written in the Devanagari script, an abugida. Devanagari consists of 11 vowels and 33 consonants and is written from left to right. Unlike Sanskrit, Devanagari is not entirely phonetic for Hindi, especially failing to mark schwa deletion in spoken Standard Hindi.

=== Romanisation ===
The Government of India uses Hunterian transliteration as its official system of writing Hindi in the Latin script. Various other systems also exist, such as IAST, ITRANS and ISO 15919.

Romanised Hindi, also called Hinglish, is the dominant form of Hindi online. In an analysis of YouTube comments, Palakodety et al., identified that 52% of comments were in Romanised Hindi, 46% in English, and 1% in Devanagari Hindi.

== Phonology ==
Consonants
IPA	Examples			Devanagari representation	English approximation
IPA	Hindi	Urdu	ISO 15919	Devanagari representation	English approximation
k	कमज़ोर	کمزور	kamzor	क	scab
kʰ	खाल	کھال	khāl	ख	cab
ɡ	गोल	گول	gol	ग	ago
ɡʱ	घर	گھر	ghar	घ	loghouse
ŋ	रंग	رن٘گ	raṅg	ङ	bang
tʃ	चोर	چور	cor	च	catch
tʃʰ	छोड़ना	چھوڑنا	choṛnā	छ	achoo
dʒ	जान	جان	jān	ज	budging
dʒʱ	झड़ना	جھڑنا	jhaṛnā	झ	hedgehog
ʈ	टमाटर	ٹماٹر	ṭamāṭar	‌‌‌ट	stub (but retroflex)
ʈʰ	ठंड	ٹھنڈ	ṭhanḍ	ठ	tub (but retroflex)
ɖ	डालना	ڈالنا	ḍālnā	ड	American bird
ɖʱ	ढक्कन	ڈھکّن	ḍhakkan	ढ	American birdhouse
ɳ	किरण	کرن	kiraṇ	ण	American burn
t	तालाब	تالاب	tālāb	त	similar to outthink, Spanish tomar
t	लतीफ़ा	لطیفہ	lat̤īfā	त	similar to outthink, Spanish tomar
tʰ	थैला	تھیلا	thailā	थ	tub (but dental)
d	दाल	دال	dāl	द	the
dʱ	धूप	دھوپ	dhūp	ध	adhere (but dental)
n	नहीं	نہیں	nahī̃	न	panther
p	पल	پل	pal	प	spot
pʰ	फल	پھل	phal	फ	pot
b	बीस	بیس	bīs	ब	cabbie
bʱ	भालू	بھالو	bhālū	भ	clubhouse
m	मगर	مگر	magar	म	much
j	याद	یاد	yād	य	yuck
r	रस	رس	ras	र	Trilled ring
r	ज़र्रा	ذرّہ	zarra	र	Trilled ring
ɾ	ज़रा	ذرا	zarā	र	American atom
l	लब	لب	lab	ल	leaf
ʋ	वर्ज़िश	ورزش	varziś	व	vat
w	पकवान	پكوان	pakvān	व	well
ʃ	काश	کاش	kāś	श	shoe
ʂ	नष्ट	نشٹ	naṣṭ	ष	shrew
s	सब	سب	sab	स	sun
s	साफ़	صاف	s̤āf	स	sun
s	साबित	ثابت	s̱ābit	स	sun
ɦ	हम	ہم	ham	ह	ahead
ɦ	हुक्म	حکم	h̤ukm	ह	ahead
q	क़रीब	قریب	qarīb	‌‌‌क़	somewhat like caught
x	ख़राब	خراب	k͟harāb	ख़	Scottish loch
ɣ	बाग़	باغ	bāġ	ग़	Similar to the French R
z	काग़ज़	کاغذ	kāġaz	ज़	zoo
ʒ	अझ़दहा	اژدہا	aždahā	झ़	pleasure
ɽ	लड़ना	لڑنا	laṛnā	ड़	American garter
ɽʱ	पढ़ाई	پڑھائی	paṛhāī	ढ़	no English equivalent
f	ख़िलाफ़	خلاف	k͟hilāf	फ़	fuss
ʔ	एतबार	اعتبار	iʻtibār		The pause in "uh-oh!", butter "bu'er" (t-glottalising dialects)

Vowels
IPA	Examples			Devanagari representation	English approximation
IPA	Hindi	Urdu	ISO 15919	Devanagari representation	English approximation
ə	कल	کَل	kal	अ	about
ɛ	रहना	رہنا	rêhnā	अ	pen
aː	काम	کام	kām	आ or ा	father
i	जितना	جِتنا	jitnā	इ or ि	sit
iː	जीतना	جیتنا	jītnā	ई or ी	seat
u	उन	اُن	un	उ or ु	book
uː	ऊन	اُون	ūn	ऊ or ू	moon
eː	जेब	جیب	jeb	ए or े	mail
ɛː	कैसा	کیسا	kaisā	ऐ or ै	fairy
oː	बोलो	بولو	bolo	ओ or ो	grow
ɔː	कौन	کَون	kaun	औ or ौ	job
◌̃	हँस	ہن٘س	ham̐s	ँ	nasal vowel faun ([ãː, õː], etc.)
◌̃	मैं	مَیں	maī̃	ँ	nasal vowel faun ([ãː, õː], etc.)

Suprasegmentals
IPA	Example	Notes
ˈ◌	[ˈbaːɦər]	stress (placed before stressed syllable)
◌ː	[ˈʊtːəɾ pɾəˈdeːʃ]	doubled consonant (placed after doubled consonant)

== Grammar ==
Hindi is a fusional-inflectional language. It is also a predominantly SOV language, though has a flexible word order, which is permitted by the language's use of a rich case-marking system. The ergative (ने, ne) and accusative/dative (को, ko) case markers allow for scrambling, with OSV, OVS, and SVO active voice structures all being possible without yielding any change in grammatical meaning. VSO is also possible by the same logic, though appears more rarely. Passive voice constructions, on the other hand, require changes in verb morphology, usually involving participle verb forms and auxiliary verbs.

=== Nouns ===
Nouns in Hindi only show morphological marking for number and case. Under the framework of Distributed Morphology, for each of these there exists only two variations. A noun's number can either be singular or plural. A noun's case can either be direct or oblique. Outside of the Distributed Morphology framework, the vocative case exists as a third noun case in Hindi, though it is identical to the oblique form except in the case of the plural. The vocative is also scarcely used, and thus simplified descriptions of Hindi grammar sometimes omit it. Hindi nouns are also inherently gendered, though gender is not reliably shown by any specific morphological marking.

For animate nouns, -इन (-in) can sometimes be added to masculine nouns to get feminine equivalents. For example, सुनार (transl. goldsmith) becomes सुनारिन (transl. wife of a goldsmith). For cases of nouns ending with a vowel, the vowel is removed and replaced with -इन, with धोबी (transl. washerman) becoming धोबिन (transl. washerwoman, or transl. wife of a washerman).

== Vocabulary ==
Traditionally, Hindi words are divided into five principal categories according to their etymology:

- Tatsam (तत्सम transl. "same as that") words: These are words which are spelled the same in Hindi as in Sanskrit (except for the absence of final case inflections). They include words inherited from Sanskrit via Prakrit which have survived without modification (e.g. Hindi नाम nām / Sanskrit नाम nāma, "name", as well as forms borrowed directly from Sanskrit in more modern times (e.g. प्रार्थना prārthanā, "prayer"). Pronunciation, however, conforms to Hindi norms and may differ from that of classical Sanskrit. Amongst nouns, the tatsam word could be the Sanskrit non-inflected word-stem, or it could be the nominative singular form in the Sanskrit nominal declension.
- Ardhatatsam (अर्धतत्सम transl. "semi-tatsama") words: Such words are typically earlier loanwords from Sanskrit which have undergone sound changes subsequent to being borrowed. (e.g. Hindi सूरज sūraj from Sanskrit सूर्य sūrya)
- Tadbhav (तद्भव transl. "born of that") words: These are native Hindi words derived from Sanskrit after undergoing phonological rules (e.g. Sanskrit कर्म karma, "deed" becomes Shauraseni Prakrit कम्म kamma, and eventually Hindi काम kām, "work") and are spelled differently from Sanskrit.
- Dēshaj (देशज transl. "of the country") words: These are words that were not borrowings from non-indigenous languages but do not derive from attested Indo-Aryan words either. Belonging to this category are onomatopoetic words or ones borrowed from local non-Indo-Aryan languages.
- Vidēshī (विदेशी transl. "foreign") words: These include all loanwords from non-indigenous languages. The most frequent source languages in this category are Persian, Arabic, Chagatai, English, French and Portuguese. Examples are क़िला qila "fort" ultimately from Arabic (through Persian), कमेटी kamēṭī from English committee.

The majority of Hindi vocabulary is either tatsam or tadbhav.

=== Prakrit ===
Hindi has naturally inherited a large portion of its vocabulary from Shauraseni Prakrit, in the form of tadbhava words. This process usually involves compensatory lengthening of vowels preceding consonant clusters in Prakrit, e.g. Sanskrit tīkṣṇa > Prakrit tikkha > Hindi tīkhā.

=== Sanskrit ===
Much of Modern Standard Hindi's vocabulary is borrowed from Sanskrit as tatsam borrowings, especially in technical and academic fields. The formal Hindi standard, from which much of the Persian, Arabic and English (i.e., basically vidēshī words) vocabulary has been effectively purged out and eventually replaced by neologisms compounding tatsam words, is called Śuddh Hindi (pure Hindi), and is viewed as a more prestigious dialect over other more colloquial forms of Hindi.

Excessive use of tatsam words sometimes creates problems for native speakers (especially in the northwestern India). They may have Sanskrit consonant clusters which do not exist in Hindustani, causing difficulties in pronunciation.

As a part of the process of Sanskritisation, new words are coined using Sanskrit components to be used as replacements for the foreign vocabulary. Usually these neologisms are calques of English words already adopted into spoken and colloquial Hindi. Some terms such as dūrbhāṣ "telephone", literally "far-speech" and dūrdarśan "television", literally "far-sight" have even gained some currency in formal Hindi in the place of the English borrowings (ṭêli)fōn and ṭīvī.

=== Persian and Arabic ===
Hindi also features significant Persian influence, standardised from spoken Hindustani. Early borrowings, beginning in the mid-12th century, were specific to Islam (e.g. Muḥammad, Islām) and so Persian was simply an intermediary for Arabic. Later, under the Delhi Sultanate and Mughal Empire, Persian became the primary administrative language in the Hindi heartland. Persian borrowings reached a heyday in the 17th century, pervading all aspects of life. Even grammatical constructs, namely the izāfat, were assimilated into Hindi.

The status of Persian language then and thus its influence, is also visible in Hindi proverbs:

हाथ-कंगन को आरसी क्या,
पढ़े-लिखे को फ़ारसी क्या।

Hāth-kaṅgan kō ārsī kyā,
Paṛhē-likhē kō Fārsī kyā.

What is mirror to a hand with bangles,
What is Persian to a literate.

The emergence of Modern Standard Hindi in the 19th century went along with the Sanskritisation of its vocabulary, leading to a marginalisation (and in some cases, even the purgation) of Turko-Perso-Arabic vocabulary in Hindi, which continued after Partition when the Indian government co-opted the policy of Sanskritisation. However, many Turko-Perso-Arabic words (e.g. bas "enough", khud "self") have remained entrenched even in Modern Standard Hindi, and an even larger amount of the said words are still used in Urdu poetry written in the Devanagari script. Many words borrowed from Persian in turn were loanwords from Arabic (e.g. muśkil "difficult", havā "air", x(a)yāl "thought", kitāb "book").

Loanwords from Persian derived from Arabic
Perso-Arabic word	Hindi word	Gloss
وقت waqt	वक़्त vaqt	time
قميص qamīṣ	क़मीज़ qamīz	shirt (Note: ultimately comes from the Latin "camisia" pronunciation reinforced by Portuguese "camisa".)
كتاب kitāb	किताब kitāb	book
نصيب naṣīb	नसीब nasīb	destiny
كرسي kursiyy	कुर्सी kursī	chair
حساب ḥisāb	हिसाब hisāb	calculation
قانون qānūn	क़ानून qānūn	law (Note: ultimately comes from the Greek κανών (kanōn))
خبر ḵabar	ख़बर xabar	news
دنيا dunyā	दुनिया duniyā	world

=== English ===
Hindi also makes extensive use of loan translation (calqueing) and occasionally phono-semantic matching of English.

=== Portuguese ===
Many Hindustani words were derived from Portuguese due to interaction with colonists and missionaries:

Hindi	Meaning	Portuguese
anānās (अनानास)	pineapple	ananás
pādrī (पाद्री)	priest	padre
bālṭī (बाल्टी)	bucket	balde
čābī (चाबी)	key	chave
girjā (गिर्जा)	church	igreja
almārī (अलमारी)	cupboard	armário
botal (बोतल)	bottle	botelha
aspatāl (अस्पताल)	hospital	hospital
olandez (ओलंदेज़)	Holland	holandês

== Media ==
=== Literature ===
Hindi literature is broadly divided into four prominent forms or styles, being Bhakti (devotional – Kabir, Raskhan); Śṛṇgār (beauty – Keshav, Bihari); Vīgāthā (epic); and Ādhunik (modern).

Medieval Hindi literature is marked by the influence of Bhakti movement and the composition of long, epic poems. It was primarily written in other varieties of Hindi, particularly Avadhi and Braj Bhasha, but to a degree also in Kaurai/Dehlavi, the basis for Standard Hindi. During the British Raj, Hindustani became the prestige dialect.

Chandrakanta, written by Devaki Nandan Khatri in 1888, is considered the first authentic work of prose in modern Hindi. The person who brought realism in Hindi prose literature was Munshi Premchand, who is considered the most revered figure in the world of Hindi fiction and progressive movement. Literary, or Sāhityik, Hindi was popularised by the writings of Swami Dayananda Saraswati, Bhartendu Harishchandra and others. The rising numbers of newspapers and magazines made Hindustani popular with educated people.

The Dvivedī Yug ("Age of Dwivedi") in Hindi literature lasted from 1900 to 1918. It is named after Mahavir Prasad Dwivedi, who played a major role in establishing Standard Hindi in poetry and broadening the acceptable subjects of Hindi poetry from the traditional ones of religion and romantic love.

In the 20th century, Hindi literature saw a romantic upsurge. This is known as Chāyāvād (shadow-ism) and the literary figures belonging to this school are known as Chāyāvādī. Jaishankar Prasad, Suryakant Tripathi 'Nirala', Mahadevi Varma and Sumitranandan Pant, are the four major Chāyāvādī poets.

Uttar Ādhunik is the post-modernist period of Hindi literature, marked by a questioning of early trends that copied the West as well as the excessive ornamentation of the Chāyāvādī movement, and by a return to simple language and natural themes.

=== Internet ===
Hindi literature, music, and film have all been disseminated via the internet. In 2015, Google reported a 94% increase in Hindi-content consumption year-on-year, adding that 21% of users in India prefer content in Hindi. Many Hindi newspapers also offer digital editions.

== Sample text ==
The following is a sample text in High Hindi, of Article 1 of the Universal Declaration of Human Rights (by the United Nations):

Hindi in Devanagari Script
अनुच्छेद १(एक): सभी मनुष्य जन्म से स्वतन्त्र तथा मर्यादा और अधिकारों में समान होते हैं। वे तर्क और विवेक से सम्पन्न हैं तथा उन्हें भ्रातृत्व की भावना से परस्पर के प्रति कार्य करना चाहिए।

Transliteration (ISO)

Anucchēd 1 (ēk): Sabhī manuṣya janma sē svatantra tathā maryādā aur adhikārō̃ mē̃ samān hōtē haĩ. Vē tark aur vivēk sē sampanna haĩ tathā unhē̃ bhrātr̥tva kī bhāvanā sē paraspar kē pratī kārya karnā cāhiē.
Transcription (IPA)
[ənʊtːʃʰeːd eːk | səbʰiː mənʊʂjə dʒənmə seː sʋət̪ənt̪ɾə t̪ətʰaː məɾjaːd̪aː ɔːɾ əd̪ʰɪkaːɾõː mẽː səmaːn hoːteː hɛ̃ː‖ ʋeː t̪əɾk ɔːɾ ʋɪʋeːk seː səmpənːə hɛ̃ː t̪ətʰaː ʊnʰẽː bʰɾaːtɾɪt̪ʋə kiː bʰaːʋənaː seː pəɾəspəɾ keː pɾət̪iː kaːɾjə kəɾnaː tʃaːhɪeː‖]
Gloss (word-to-word)
Article 1 (one) – All humans birth from independent and dignity and rights in equal are. They logic and conscience from endowed are and they fraternity in the spirit of each other towards work should.
Translation (grammatical)
Article 1 – All humans are born independent and equal in dignity and rights. They are endowed with logic and conscience and they should work towards each other in the spirit of fraternity.

== See also ==
- Hindi Belt
- Bengali Language Movement (Manbhum)
- Hindi Diwas – the official day to celebrate Hindi as a language.
- Languages of India
- Languages with official recognition in India
- Indian states by most spoken scheduled languages
- World Hindi Secretariat

=== Lists ===
- List of English words of Hindi or Urdu origin
- List of Hindi television channels in Europe (by type)
- List of languages by number of native speakers in India
- List of Sanskrit, Arabic and Persian roots in Hindi
