= Tatsama =

Sanskrit loanwords in modern Indic languages

Tatsama (Sanskrit: तत्सम IPA: [tɐtsɐmɐ], lit. 'same as that') are Sanskrit loanwords in modern Indo-Aryan languages like Assamese, Bengali, Marathi, Nepali, Odia, Hindi, Gujarati, and Sinhala and in Dravidian languages like Tamil, Kannada and Telugu. They generally belong to a higher and more erudite register than common words, many of which are (in modern Indo-Aryan languages) directly inherited from Old Indo-Aryan (tadbhava). The tatsama register can be compared to the use of loan words of Greek or Latin origin in English (e.g. hubris).

== Eastern Indo-Aryan ==
=== Bengali ===
The origin of tatsama words (Bengali: তৎসম, romanized: tôtśômô) in Bengali is traced to 10th century poets. Another, more minor, wave of tatsama vocabulary entered the (Modern) Bengali language by Sanskrit scholars teaching at Fort William College in Kolkata at the start of the 19th century. Bengali's lexicon is now about 40% tatsama (with about 16% tadbhava vocabulary inherited from Old Indo-Aryan via the Prakrit languages such as Apabhraṃśa and Abahaṭṭha).

The form of Bengali with the highest tatsama words is Sadhu Bhasha.

=== Odia ===
Early Odia dictionaries such as Gitabhidhana (17th century), Sabda Tattva Abhidhana (1916), Purnachandra Odia Bhashakosha (1931) and Promoda Abhidan (1942) list Sanskrit tatsama vocabulary. They are derived from Sanskrit verbal roots with the addition of suffixes (both Sanskrit as well as Odia) and known in Odia as tatsama krudanta (Odia: ତତ୍ସମ କୃଦନ୍ତ, romanized: tatsama kr̥danta, lit. 'tatsama words ending with an affix that makes it a noun').

Odia is generally used with many tatsama words, though tadhbhava words do also surface many times; with foreign loanwords (especially from Persian, Arabic and Turkic) appearing marginally.

== Southern Indo-Aryan ==
=== Sinhala ===
The way the tatsama entered the Sinhala language is comparable to what is found in Bengali, Odia, Marathi and Hindi languages: they are scholarly borrowings of Sanskrit or Pali terms. Tatsama in Sinhala can be identified by their ending exclusively in -ya or -va, whereas native Sinhala words tend to show a greater array of endings. Many scientific concepts make use of tatsama, for instance grahaṇaya 'eclipse', but they are also found for more everyday concepts.

== Western Indo-Aryan ==
For the most part, the western Indo-Aryan languages such as Punjabi, Sindhi, Hindko, and Saraiki generally do not use tatsama vocabulary in day-to-day life. The majority of words in these languages are inherited from Prakrit or borrowed from Persian, Arabic and Turkic. The notable exception in the group of western Indo-Aryan languages is Hindustani, which began with most of its borrowed vocabulary coming from Persian, and in recent history has incorporated a larger amount of learned borrowings from Sanskrit in its new variety called Modern Standard Hindi. Many of these, however, are borrowed indirectly from Bengali, Gujarati, Odia or Marathi, or given meanings based on English or Perso-Arabic derived words already in use in Hindustani. Most of the tatsama vocabulary occurring in Punjabi is borrowed from Hindi, and likewise tatsama words in languages spoken further west are likely to be indirect loans of Hindi words used in Punjabi (though there exists various tatsama words being used in the Guru Granth Sahib). Very few of these are used in colloquial speech, and their use tends to be limited to formal settings or Hindu religious contexts.

== Dravidian ==
=== Malayalam ===
Malayalam has many tatsama words, which are used in written and spoken language depending on register and dialect.

For example:

- abhimānam, pride
- abhyāsam, practice
- vidya, education
- viśuddham, holy
- viśvāsam, believe
- śvāsam, breath
- vichāram, thought
- bōdham, sense
- śatru, enemy
- rakṣakan, saviour
- ākāśam, sky
- svargam, heaven
- pustakam, book
- svapnam, dream
- prēmam, love
- ullāsam, merriment
- śarīram, body
- daivam, god

=== Telugu ===
Sanskrit influenced the Telugu language for about 500 years. During 1000-1100 AD, Nannaya's Telugu in Mahabharata, Telugu in several inscriptions, Telugu in poetry reestablished its roots and dominated over the royal language, Sanskrit. Telugu absorbed the Tatsamas from Sanskrit.

Metrical poetry in Telugu ('Chandassu') uses meters such as Utpalamala, Champakamala, Mattebham, Sardoola, Sragdhara, Bhujangaprayata etc.. which are pure Sanskrit meters.

Telugu has many tatsama words, known as prakruti. The equivalent colloquial words are called vikrutis, meaning "distorted". Prakruti are used only as a medium of instruction in educational institutions, offices etc. Today, spoken Telugu contains both prakruthi and vikruthi words.

For example:

prakruti	vikruti	meaning
bhōjanam	bōnam	food
vidya	viddhe	education
rākshasi	rākāsi / rakkasi	demoness
dr̥ṣṭi	dishti	sight
śūnya	sunnā	zero
