= Hindustani vocabulary =

Vocabulary of the Hindustani language

Hindustani, also known as Hindi-Urdu, like all Indo-Aryan languages, has a core base of Sanskrit-derived vocabulary, which it gained through Prakrit. As such the standardized registers of the Hindustani language (Hindi-Urdu) share a common vocabulary, especially on the colloquial level. However, in formal contexts, Modern Standard Hindi tends to draw on Sanskrit, while Standard Urdu turns to Persian and sometimes Arabic. This difference lies in the history of Hindustani, in which the lingua franca started to gain more Persian words in urban areas (such as Delhi, Lucknow and Hyderabad), under the Delhi Sultanate; this dialect came to be termed Urdu.

The original Hindi dialects continued to develop alongside Urdu and according to Professor Afroz Taj, "the distinction between Hindi and Urdu was chiefly a question of style. A poet could draw upon Urdu's lexical richness to create an aura of elegant sophistication, or could use the simple rustic vocabulary of dialect Hindi to evoke the folk life of the village. Somewhere in the middle lay the day to day language spoken by the great majority of people. This day to day language was often referred to by the all-encompassing term Hindustani." In Colonial India, Hindi-Urdu acquired vocabulary introduced by Christian missionaries from the Germanic and Romanic languages, e.g. pādrī (Devanagari: पादरी, Nastaleeq: پادری) from padre, meaning pastor.

When describing the state of Hindi-Urdu under the British Raj, Professor Śekhara Bandyopādhyāẏa stated that "Truly speaking, Hindi and Urdu, spoken by a great majority of people in north India, were the same language written in two scripts; Hindi was written in Devanagari script and therefore had a greater sprinkling of Sanskrit words, while Urdu was written in Persian script and thus had more Persian and Arabic words in it. At the more colloquial level, however, the two languages were mutually intelligible." After the partition of India, political forces within India tried to further Sanskritize Hindi, while political forces in Pakistan campaigned to remove Prakit/Sanskrit derived words from Urdu and supplant them with Persian and Arabic words. Despite these government efforts, the film industry, Bollywood continues to release its films in the original Hindustani (Hindi-Urdu) language, easily understood and enjoyed by speakers of both registers; in addition, many of the same television channels are viewed across the border. In modern times, a third variety of Hindustani with significant English influences has also appeared, which is sometimes called Hinglish or Urdish.

== Linguistic classification ==
Hindi (हिन्दी Hindi) is one of the Indo-Aryan languages of the Indo-European language family. The core of Hindi vocabulary is thus etymologically Indo-European. However, centuries of borrowing has led to the adoption of a wide range of words with foreign origins.

== Examples of borrowed words ==
Due to centuries of contact with Europeans, Turkic peoples, Arabs, Persians, and East Asians, Hindi-Urdu has absorbed countless words from foreign languages, often totally integrating these borrowings into the core vocabulary. The most common borrowings from foreign languages come from three different kinds of contact. Close contact with neighboring peoples facilitated the borrowing of words from other Indian languages, Chinese, Burmese, and several indigenous Austroasiatic languages of North India. After centuries of invasions from Persia and the Middle East, particularly under the Mughal Empire, numerous Turkish, Arabic, and Persian words were absorbed and fully integrated into the lexicon. Later, European colonialism brought words from Portuguese, French, Dutch, and most significantly English. Some very common borrowings are shown below.

=== Borrowings from neighboring languages ===
==== Other Indo-Aryan languages ====
Word	Meaning	Origin
चड्डी چڈی caḍḍī	underwear	Punjabi ਚੱਡੀ caḍḍī
खट्टा کھٹا khaṭṭā	sour	Punjabi ਖੱਟਾ khaṭṭā
कुंजी کنجی kuñjī	key	Punjabi ਕੁੰਜੀ kuñjī
लफड़ा لفڑا laphṛā	fight, love affair (originally Bombay Hindi)	Marathi लफडे laphḍe or Gujarati લફડો laphḍo

==== Dravidian languages (द्राविड़ी دراوڑی Drāviṛī) ====
Word	Meaning	Origin
कबड्डी کبڈی kabaḍḍī	kabaddi	Tamil கை பிடி kai piṭi ("to hold hands")
वड़ा وڑا vaṛā	vada	Tamil வடை vaṭai
अगर اگر agar	agarwood	Tamil அகில் akil
चप्पल چپل cappal	sandals	Telugu చెప్పులు ceppulu ("shoes, footwear")

==== Austroasiatic languages ====
Word	Meaning
आलू آلو ālū	potato
खोज کھوج khoj	discovery
चावल چاول cāwal	rice grains
चूल्हा چولہا cūlhā	oven, stove
झोल جھول jhol	gravy
टाँग ٹانگ ṭaṅg	leg
ढोल ڈھول ḍhol	dhol, drum
पेट پیٹ peṭ	belly

==== Chinese (चीनी چینی Cīnī) ====
Word	Meaning	Original form
चाय چائے cāy/cāe	tea	茶 chá
चीनी چینی cīnī	sugar/Chinese	秦 qín
लीची لیچی līcī	lychee	茘枝 lìzhī

=== Borrowings from the Persianate era ===
==== Arabic (अरबी عربی 'Arbī) ====
Many (though not all) Arabic loanwords in Hindi-Urdu are through Classical Persian.

Word	Meaning	Original form
अक़्ल عقل aql	wisdom	عقل ‘aql
इलाक़ा علاقہ ilāqā	area	علاقة ‘alāqa "relationship, connection"
वज़न وزن vazan	weight	وزن wazn "scale"
क़बर قبر qabr	grave	قبر qubr
ख़बर خبر k͟habar	news	خبر ḫabar
ख़ाली خالی k͟hālī	empty	خالي ḫāliyy
ख़्याल خیال k͟hayāl	consideration	خيال ḫayāl " imagination"
ग़रीब غریب ġarīb	poor	غريب ġarīb "strange"
जवाब جواب javāb	answer	جواب jawāb
सवाल سوال savāl	question	سؤال su‘āl
जमा جمع jamā	collect	جمع jam‘
तारीख़ تاریخ tārīk͟h	date	تاريخ tārīḫ "history, date"
दुनिया دنیا duniyā	world	دنيا dunyā
नक़ल نقل naqal	fake	نقل naql
फ़क़ीर فقیر faqīr	poor person	فقير faqīr
बदल بدل badal	exchange	بدل badl
बाक़ी باقی bāqī	remaining	بقي baqīy
साहब صاحب sāhab	sir	صاحب ṣāḥib "friend"
हिसाब حساب hisāb	calculation	حساب ḥisāb
मालिक مالک mālik	owner	مالك mālik "owner, proprietor, holder"
लज़ीज़ لذیذ lazīz	delicious	لذيذ laḏīḏ "tasty"
किताब کتاب kitāb	book	كتاب kitāb "book"
एहतियात احتیاط ehtiyāt	precaution	احتياط iḥtiyyāt "precaution, reserve"
शख़्स شخص śak͟hs	person	شخص šaḫs "person"
शहीद شہید śahīd	martyr	شهيد šahīd "martyr"
हद حد had	limit	حد ḥadd "limit"
सेहत صحت sehat	health	صحة ṣiḥḥa "health"

==== Persian (फ़ारसी فارسی) ====
Word	Meaning	Original Form
ख़ुश خوش k͟huś	happy	خوش xwaš
दर्द درد dard	pain	درد dard
बदन بدن badan	body	بدن badan
शायद شاید śāyad	maybe	شاید šāyad
हमेशा ہمیشہ hameśā	always	همیشه hamēša
साल سال sāl	year	سال sāl
गर्म گرم garm	warm	گرم garm
आसमान آسمان āsmān	sky	آسمان āsmān
ज़मीन زمین zamīn	land	زمین zamīn, "the earth"
रोज़ा روزہ rozā	fasting	روزه rōza, "a fast"

==== Turkic languages (तुर्की ترکی Turkī) ====
Almost all Turkic loans in Hindi-Urdu have been borrowed via Classical Persian.

Word	Meaning	Original form
उर्दू اردو Urdū	Urdu	Ultimately from Proto-Turkic *ordu ("army") (via Persian اردو urdū; language sense is shortened from Persian زبان اردوی معلی zubān-i urdū-yi mu‘allā, "language of the exalted camp"; see more at Urdu § Etymology)
क़ैंची قینچی qaiñcī	scissors	kaïcï in Chagatai/Proto-Mongolic (via Persian قینچی qaynčī)
क़ोरमा قورمہ qormā	korma	Ottoman Turkish قاورمه kaverma ("roasted meat") (via Persian قورمه qōrma)
बावरची باورچی bāvarcī	cook, chef, bawarchi	Ottoman Turkish via Persian باورچی bāwarčī
बेगम بیگم begam	lady, begum	Chagatai بیگم begim (via Persian بیگم bēgum)
क़ुली قلی qulī	laborer, porter, coolie	Chagatai قلی quli ("slave of")
यूरिश یورش yūriś	assault	Chagatai یورش yöriş (via Persian یورش yūriš)

=== Borrowings from the Colonial Era ===
==== Portuguese (पुर्तुगाली پرتگالی Purtugālī) ====
Portuguese borrowings mostly describe household items, fruits, and religious concepts dealing with Catholicism:

Household

Word	Meaning	Original form
अलमारी الماری almāri	closet, cupboard	armário
आलपीन آلپین ālpīn	safety pin	alfinete
इस्तरी استری istarī	to iron	estirar (means to lengthen a cable)
इस्पात ایسپات ispāt	steel	espada "sword"
गमला گملا gamlā	basket	gamela "wooden trough"
चाबी چابی cābī	key	chave
जंगला جنگلا jaṅglā	window-railing	janela
तम्बाकू تمباکو tambākū	tobacco	tabaco
तौलिया تولیہ tauliyā	towel	toalha
फ़ीता فیتا fītā	lace, ribbon	fita
बराम्दा برامدہ baramdā	verandah	varanda
बाल्टी بالٹی bālṭī	pail	balde

Food

Word	Meaning	Original form
अनन्नास انناس anannās	pineapple	ananás
काजू کاجو kājū	cashew	caju
गोभी گوبھی gobhī	cabbage, cauliflower	couve
पाव रोटी پاؤ روٹی pāv roṭī/pāo roṭī	sliced bread	pão "bread" (generic name for bread)
पपीता پپیتا papītā	papaya	papaia
साबूदाना سابودانا sābūdānā	sago	sagu
सलाद سلاد salād	salad	salada

Religion

Word	Meaning	Original form
क्रूस کروس krūs	cross	cruz
गिरजा گرجا girjā	church	igreja
पादरी پادری pādrī	Christian priest/minister	padre

Other

Word	Meaning	Original form
अंग्रेज़ انگریز aṅgrez	English	inglês
ओलंदेज़ اولبدیز olandez	Dutch	holandês ("Hollander")
अस्पताल اسپتال aspatāl	hospital	espital
पिस्तौल پستول pistaul	pistol	pistola
फ़ालतू فالتو fāltū	useless	falto

==== French (फ़रासीसी فراسیسی Farāsīsī) ====
Only a handful of French borrowings are still used in Hindi-Urdu today.

Word	Meaning	Original form
कारतूस کارتوس kārtūs	cartridge	cartouche
अटैची اٹیچی aṭaicī	suitcase	attaché (borrowed via English)
रेस्तोराँ ریستوراں restorā̃	restaurant	restaurant

==== English (अंग्रेज़ी انگریزی Aṅgrezī) ====
Most borrowed words of European origin in Hindi-Urdu were imported through English and involve civic and household concepts:

Civic life

Word	Original form
अफ़सर افسر afsar	officer
जेल جیل jel	jail
डॉक्टर ڈاکٹر ḍôkṭar/dākṭar	doctor
पुलिस پولیس pulis/polīs	police
बैंक بینک baiṅk	bank
वोट ووٹ voṭ	vote
स्कूल اسکول skūl/iskūl	school

Household

Word	Original form
कप کپ kap	cup
गिलास گلاس gilās	glass
टेबल ٹیبل ṭebal	table
बॉक्स باکس bôks/bāks	box
लालटेन لالٹین lālṭen	lantern
कनस्तर کنستر kanastar	canister

=== Usage Example ===
Comparison of different modern Khariboli registers using the same sentence
Language	Sentence (in Latin script)	Remarks
English	The clouds of our country shower blessings on this land.	
Modern Standard Hindi	Hamārē rāṣṭra kē mēgh is bhūmi par vardān varṣātē ha͠i. (Devanagari: हमारे राष्ट्र के मेघ इस भूमि पर वरदान वर्षाते हैं।)	Highly Sanskritised variety with tatsama vocabulary (although MSH does also employ native tadbhava vocabulary as well), generally preferred for formal purposes by followers of Dharmic religions, Sanskritists and linguistic purists and puritanists alike.
Hindustani	Hamārē dēs kā bādal is dhartī par vardān/barkat barsātē ha͠i.	Colloquial variety with native tadbhava vocabulary, with a substantial number of loanwords from both tatsama vocabulary, as well as from Persian and Arabic (and to some extent, even Turkic), as seen (to some extent) in Ganga-Jamuni tehzeeb.
Hinglish/Urdish	Hamārē country kē clouds is land par blessings shower kartē ha͠i.	Heavy code-mixing with English words and phrases.
Standard Urdu	Hamārē mulk ke abr is zamīn par raḥmat nāzil kartē ha͠i. (Nastaliq: ہمارے ملک کے ابر اس زمین پر رحمت نازل کرتے ہیں۔)	Highly Persianised and Arabised variety, mostly preferred for formal purposes by followers of Islam and people in a Persianate culture and setting.

== Days of the week ==
Colloquial Hindustani uses tadbhava words, (more precisely, ardhatatsama terms), with slight variations across Delhi's Khari Boli and other regional Hindi languages. In present day, Modern Standard Hindi, which is preferred by followers of Dharmic religions, uses pure and unadulterated tatsama forms (direct Sanskrit loanwords). And Standard Urdu, which is preferred by the followers of Islam and people in a Persianate culture and setting, uses 2 loanwords from Arabic (for Thursday and Friday), 2 loanwords from Persian (for Monday and Saturday), and remaining words used from colloquial Hindustani as it is. Dakhini distinctively uses a different Persian loanword for Wednesday (chār-śanba), from Rekhta, the older register of Standard Urdu, and still used today by Muslims for religious days like Akhiri Chahar Shambah.

Comparison of daynames across different registers
Hinglish	Colloquial Hindustani	Formal Hindi	Formal Urdu	Rekhta
Sunday	itvār / ādi	ravivār / ādityavār	itvār	ēk-śanba
Monday	sōm	sōmvār	pīr	dō-śanba
Tuesday	mangal / mangar	mangalvār	mangal	tī/sī-śanba
Wednesday	budh	budhvār	budh	chār-śanba
Thursday	biphē / biphai	guruvār / vīrvār / br̥haspativār	jumērāt	panj-śanba
Friday	sukkar / sūk	śukravār	jum'ā	jum'ā
Saturday	sanīchar / thābar	śanivār	hafta	śanba

== Numbers ==
=== Zero ===
In Hindustani, the word sunnā is used for zero, and in Urdu, the Arabic word sifr is used. Today in formal Hindi, the Sanskrit word śūnya is used, and in Hinglish, it is zīrō (direct loanword from English).

=== Thousand ===
In Khariboli (Old Hindi), the word sahas was used to denote thousand, which was the shortened tadbhava form of the Sanskrit word sahasra. Since the Delhi Sultanate, the Persian loanword hazār became commonly used in Hindustani for denoting thousand, colloquially pronounced as hajār in Hindi.

=== Ordinals ===
For ordinal numbers, Hindustani uses tadbhava words (native vocabulary), Formal Hindi prefers tatsama (Sanskrit loanwords), and Formal Urdu prefers Perso-Arabic loanwords.

English	Hindustani	Modern Standard Hindi	Standard Urdu
First	Pahlā	Pratham	Avval
Second	Dūsrā	Dvitīya	Dom / Doyam
Third	Tīsrā	Tr̥tīya	Som / Soyam
Fourth	Cauthā	Caturtha	Cahārum
Fifth	Pāñcvāṅ	Pañcam	Panjum
Sixth	Chaṭhā	Ṣaṣṭha	Šašum
Seventh	Sātvāṅ	Saptam	Haftum
Eighth	Āṭhvāṅ	Aṣṭam	Haštum
Ninth	Nauvāṅ	Navam	Nuhum
Tenth	Dasvāṅ	Daśam	Dahum

== See also ==
- Hindustani etymology
- Hindustani grammar
- Hindustani orthography
- Hindustani phonology
