= History of Hindustani =

Hindustani (Hindi: हिन्दुस्तानी, Urdu: ہندوستانی) is one of the predominant languages of South Asia, with federal status in the republics of India and Pakistan in its standardized forms of Hindi and Urdu respectively. It is widely spoken and understood as a second language in Nepal, Bangladesh, and the Persian Gulf and as such is considered a lingua franca in the northern Indian subcontinent. It is also one of the most widely spoken languages in the world by total number of speakers. It developed in north India, principally during the Mughal Empire, when the Persian language exerted a strong influence on the Western Hindi languages of central India; this contact between the Hindu and Muslim cultures resulted in the core Indo-Aryan vocabulary of the Indian dialect of Hindi spoken in Delhi, whose earliest form is known as Old Hindi, being enriched with Persian loanwords. Rekhta, or "mixed" speech, which came to be known as Hindustani, Hindi, Hindavi, and Urdu (derived from Zaban-i-Urdu-yi-Mu'alla by Mashafi, meaning "language of the Horde".), also locally known as Lashkari or Lashkari Zaban in long form, was thus created. This form was elevated to the status of a literary language, and after the partition of colonial India and independence this collection of dialects became the basis for modern standard Hindi and Urdu. Although these official languages are distinct registers with regard to their formal aspects, such as modern technical vocabulary, they continue to be all but indistinguishable in their vernacular form. From the colonial era onwards, Hindustani has also taken in many words from English, with an urban English-influenced variety emerging known as Hinglish and Urdish.

== Formation ==
Most of the grammar and basic vocabulary of Hindustani descends directly from the medieval Indo-Aryan language of central India, known as Shauraseni Prakrit. After the tenth century, several Śauraseni dialects were elevated to literary languages, including Braj Bhasha and the Khari Boli of Delhi.

During the reigns of the Turko-Afghan Delhi Sultanate and the Mughal Empire in India, where Persian was adopted as the official language and Delhi was established as the capital, the imperial court and concomitant immigration infused the Indo-Aryan dialect of Hindi spoken in Delhi (the earliest form is known as Old Hindi) with large numbers of Persian, Arabic, and Chagatai words from the court; this occurred as a result of cultural contact between Hindus and Muslims in Hindustan and became the fruit of a composite Ganga-Jamuni tehzeeb. The introduced words were primarily nouns and were employed for cultural, legal and political concepts. These Persian, Arabic and Chagatai loanwords form 25% of Urdu's vocabulary. As a form of Hindustani and a member of the Western Hindi category of Indo-Aryan languages, 75% of Urdu words have their etymological roots in Sanskrit and Prakrit, and approximately 99% of Urdu verbs have their roots in Sanskrit and Prakrit.

The new court language developed simultaneously in Delhi and Lucknow, the latter of which is in an Awadhi-speaking area; and thus, modern Hindustani has a noticeable Awadhi influence even though it is primarily based on Delhi dialect. In these cities, the language continued to be called "Hindi" as well as "Urdu". While Urdu retained the grammar and core vocabulary of the local Hindi dialect, it adopted the Nastaliq writing system from Persian.

The term Hindustani is derived from Hindustan, the Persian-origin name for the northwestern Indian subcontinent. The works of the 13th century scholar Amir Khusrau are typical of the Hindustani language of the time:

सेज वो सूनी देख के रोवुँ मैं दिन रैन।
पिया पिया मैं करत हूँ पहरों, पल भर सुख ना चैन॥
(Hindi script)

سیْج وہ سُونی دیکھ کے روْوُؤں مَیں دِن رَین،
پِیّا پِیّا مَیں کَرَت ہُوں پہروں، پَل بھر سُکھ نہ چَین
(Urdu script)

sēj vō sūnī dēkh kē rōvũ ma͠i din rain,
piyā piyā ma͠i karat hū̃ pahrō̃, pal bhar sukh nā cain.
(Transliteration)

Seeing the empty bed I cry day and night
Calling for my beloved all day, not a moment of happiness or peace.
(Translation)

The language went by several names over the years: Hindavi ("of Hindus or Indians"), Dehlavi ("of Delhi"), Hindustani ("of Hindustan") and Hindi ("Indian"). The Mughal Emperor Shah Jahan built a new walled city in Delhi in 1639 that came to be known as Shahjahanabad. The market close to the royal fort (the Red Fort) was called Urdu Bazaar ("Army/camp Market", from the Turkic word ordu, "army"), and it may be from this that the phrase Zaban-i-Urdu-yi-Mu'alla ("the language of the exalted army/camp") derives. This was shortened to Urdu around the year 1800. The Mughal term Urdu with the local equivalent Lashkari or "camp language" (cognate with the English word "horde"), was used to describe the common language of the Mughal army. The language spread from the interaction of Persian-speaking Muslim soldiers to the local people who spoke varieties of Hindi. Soon, the Perso-Arabic script in the cursive Nasta'liq form was adopted, with additional letters to accommodate the Indian phonetic system. A large number of Persian, Arabic and Chagatai words were adopted in Hindustani, as were even grammatical elements such as the enclitic izāfa.

The official language of the Ghurids, Delhi Sultanate, the Mughal Empire, and their successor states, as well as their language of poetry and literature, was Persian (and sometimes even their native Turkic languages), while the official language of religion was Arabic. Most of the sultans and the nobility of the Sultanate period were Turkic peoples from Central Asia who spoke Chagatai as their mother tongue. The Mughals were also Chagatai, but later adopted Persian. The basis in general for the introduction of Persian language into the Indian subcontinent was set, from its earliest days, by various Persianised Central Asian Turkic and Afghan dynasties. Muzaffar Alam asserts that Persian became the lingua franca of the empire under Akbar for various political and social factors due to its non-sectarian and fluid nature. However, the armies, merchants, preachers, Sufis, and later the court, also incorporated the local people and elements of the medieval Hindu literary language, Braj Bhasha. This new contact language soon incorporated other dialects, such as Haryanvi, and in the 17th century the dialect of the new capital at Delhi. By 1800, Delhi dialect had become the dominant base of the language.

When Wali Mohammed Wali arrived in Delhi, he established Hindustani with a light smattering of Persian, Arabic and Chagatai words, a register called Rekhta, for poetry; previously the language of poetry had been Persian. When the Delhi Sultanate expanded south to the Deccan Plateau, they carried their literary language with them, and it was influenced there by more southerly languages, producing the Dakhini dialect. During this time Hindustani was the language of both Hindus and Muslims. The non-communal nature of the language lasted until the British Raj in India, when in 1837 Hindustani in the Persian script (i.e. Urdu) replaced Persian as the official language and was made co-official along with English. This triggered the Hindu backlash in northwestern India, which argued that the language should be written in the native Devanagari script. This literary standard, called simply Hindi, replaced Urdu as the official register of Bihar in 1881, establishing a sectarian divide of "Urdu" for Muslims and "Hindi" for Hindus, a divide that was formalized with the partition of India after the withdrawal of the British in 1947. In the middle of the 18th century, a movement among Urdu poets advocating the further Persianisation of Hindustani occurred, in which certain native Sanskritic (and even Prakritic) words were supplanted with Persian (and quite recently, Arabic; especially in Pakistan) loanwords. On the other hand, organizations such as the Nagari Prachar Sabha (1893) and Hindi Sahitya Sammeland (1910) advocated a style that incorporated Sanskrit vocabulary while literally purging out (i.e., consciously removing) Persian, Arabic and Chagatai words. Despite these movements to Persianize (or Arabize) or Sanskritize the Hindustani language, Professor Afroz Taj states that the distinction between Hindi and Urdu was chiefly a question of style. A poet could draw upon Urdu's lexical richness to create an aura of elegant sophistication, or could use the simple rustic vocabulary of dialect Hindi to evoke the folk humble and mundane life of the village and semi-urban areas. Somewhere in the middle lay the day to day language spoken by the great majority of people. This day to day language was often referred to by the all-encompassing term Hindustani. Likewise, when describing the state of Hindi-Urdu under British rule in colonial India, Professor Sekhar Bandyopadhyay stated that "Truly speaking, Hindi and Urdu, spoken by a great majority of people in north India, were the same language written in two scripts; Hindi was written in Devanagari script and therefore had a greater sprinkling of Sanskrit words, while Urdu was written in the modified Perso-Arabic script and thus had more Persian, Arabic and Chagatai words in it. At the more colloquial level, however, the two languages were mutually intelligible."

The term bazaar Hindustani, in other words, the 'street talk' or literally 'marketplace Hindustani', also known as Colloquial Hindi (Note: Hindi: बोलचाल हिन्दी, Urdu: بول چال ہندی) or Simplified Urdu, (Note: Hindi: आसान उर्दू, Urdu: آسان اردو) has arisen to denote a colloquial register of the language that uses vocabulary common to both Hindi and Urdu while eschewing high-register and specialized Perso-Arabic- or Sanskrit-derived words. It has emerged in various South Asian cities where Hindustani is not the main language, in order to facilitate communication across language barriers. It is characterized by loanwords from local languages.

According to Portuguese sources, the speech of the subcontinental Muslims who spoke this language was identified as Lashkari-Hindustani (لشکری-ہندوستانی۔) by both the native speakers and outsiders to the region alike.

British rule in India introduced enormous English words into Hindustani; further influences occurred over time as English became a world language, with a new variety of Hindustani emerging known as Hinglish and Urdish.

== Poetry ==
The poet Wali Deccani (1667–1707) visited Delhi in 1700. His Rekhta or Hindavi ghazals established Hindustani as a medium of poetic expression in the imperial city. Hindustani soon gained distinction as the preferred language in courts of India and eventually replaced Persian among the nobles. To this day, Rekhta retains an important place in literary and cultural spheres. Many distinctly Persian forms of literature, such as ghazals and nazms, came to both influence and be affected by Indian culture, producing a distinct melding of Middle Eastern and South Asian heritages. A famous cross-over writer was Amir Khusrau, whose Persian and Hindavi couplets are read to this day in the subcontinent. Persian has sometimes been termed an adopted classical language of South Asia alongside Sanskrit due to this role.

== See also ==
- Linguistic history of India
- Hindustani etymology
- List of Hindi-language authors
- List of Urdu-language writers
