= Hindustani etymology =

Etymology of the Hindi and Urdu languages

Hindustani, also known as Hindi-Urdu, is the vernacular form of two standardized registers used as official languages in India and Pakistan, namely Hindi and Urdu. It comprises several closely related dialects in the northern, central and northwestern parts of the Indian subcontinent but is mainly based on Khariboli of the Delhi region. As an Indo-Aryan language, Hindustani has a core base that traces back to Sanskrit but as a widely-spoken lingua franca, it has a large lexicon of loanwords, acquired through centuries of foreign rule and ethnic diversity.

Standard Hindi derives much of its formal and technical vocabulary from Sanskrit while standard Urdu derives much of its formal and technical vocabulary from Persian and Arabic (and even from the Turkic languages to some extent). Standard Hindi and Urdu are used primarily in public addresses and radio or TV news, while the everyday spoken language is one of the several varieties of Hindustani, whose vocabulary contains words drawn from Persian, Arabic, and Sanskrit. In addition, spoken Hindustani includes words from English, the Dravidian languages, and the Sino-Tibetan languages; as well as several others.

Hindustani developed over several centuries throughout much of the northern subcontinent including the areas that comprise modern-day India, Pakistan, and Nepal. In the same way that the core vocabulary of English evolved from Old English (Anglo-Saxon) but assimilated many words borrowed from French and other languages (whose pronunciations often changed naturally so as to become easier for speakers of English to pronounce), what may be called Hindustani can be said to have evolved from Sanskrit while borrowing many Persian and Arabic words over the years, and changing the pronunciations (and often even the meanings) of these words to make them easier for Hindustani speakers to pronounce. Many Persian words entered the Hindustani lexicon due to the influence of the Mughal rulers of north India, who followed a very Persianised culture and also spoke Persian. Many Arabic words entered Hindustani via Persian, which had previously been assimilated into the Persian language due to the influence of Arabs in the area. The dialect of Persian spoken by the Mughal ruling elite was known as 'Dari', which is the dialect of Persian spoken in modern-day Afghanistan. Therefore, Hindustani is the naturally developed common language of north India. This article will deal with the separate categories of Hindustani words and some of the common words found in the Hindustani language.

== Categorization ==
Hindustani words, apart from loans, basically derive from two linguistic categories:

- Indo-Aryan (words classified by grammarians as tadbhava, or "inherited"): Shauraseni Prakrit and its apabhraṃśa, or "corrupted", vernaculars
- Non-Indo-Aryan (words classified by grammarians as dēśaja, or "indigenous"): Austroasiatic (Munda) languages, as well as Dravidian and Sino-Tibetan languages

According to the traditional categorization in Hindi (as well in other languages of India), direct loanwords from Sanskrit are classed as tatsama (Hindi: तत्सम "as it is, same as therein") and vidēśī (Hindi: विदेशी "foreign, non-native") for non-Sanskrit loans, such as those from Persian, Arabic, Turkic, Portuguese, French or English, respectively contrasting with tadbhava and dēśaja words.

The most common words in Hindustani are tadbhavas.

== Examples of derivations ==
=== Second person pronouns ===
In Hindustani, the pronoun āp (आप آپ) "[one]self", originally used as a third person honorific plural, denotes respect or formality (politeness) and originates from Prakrit 𑀅𑀧𑁆𑀧𑀸 appā, which derived from Sanskrit ātman, which refers to the higher self or level of consciousness.

The pronoun tū (तू تُو) and its grammatically plural form tum (तुम تُم) (also the second person honorific plural) denote informality, familiarity or intimacy and originate respectively from tuhuṃ and tumma from Prakrit 𑀢𑀼𑀁 tuṃ and its variant 𑀢𑀼𑀫𑀁 tumaṃ, which derived from Sanskrit tvam, nominative singular of युष्मद् yuṣmad (the base of the second person plural pronoun). In modern usage, tū is widely used to display a range of attitudes depending on the context, from extreme informality (impoliteness) to extreme intimacy to outright disrespect and even extreme reverence. Usage of tū in most contexts is considered highly offensive in the formal register except when addressing God as a display of spiritual intimacy. This is very similar to the usage of "thou" in archaic English and many other Indo-European languages showing T–V distinction.

=== Present "be" verb ===
One of the most common words in Hindustani, the copula hai (है ہے) and its plural form haiṉ (हैं ہیں) − present forms of hōnā (होना ہونا, meaning "to be" and originating from Prakrit 𑀪𑁄𑀤𑀺 bhodi derived from Sanskrit bhavati "to happen") − rather originate from the following developments:

- Sanskrit asti ("to be"; root as) evolves into Prakrit 𑀅𑀢𑁆𑀣𑀺 atthi, which further develops into ahi
- Ahi evolves into Old Hindi ahai (अहै اہَے; pronounced /əɦəɪ/, not /əɦɛː/ as in Hindustani)

Shortening of ahai occurred in Hindustani resulting in hai probably to fulfill the symmetry of the other grammatical forms of hōnā. Ahai can be found in some older works of Hindustani literature and its evidence can also be seen in other closely related Indo-Aryan languages such as Marathi (आहे āhē) or Sindhi (آهي āhē).

=== Perfective "go" verb ===
The verb jānā (जाना جانا, "to go"), which originates from Prakrit 𑀚𑀸𑀤𑀺 jādi derived from Sanskrit yāti ("to move"; root yā), however has its perfective form originating from another Prakrit word 𑀕𑀬 gaya derived from Sanskrit gata, past participle of gacchati ("to go"; root gam or gacch), for example, in gayā (गया گیا, "went, gone").

=== Some other words ===
The word ājā (आजा آجا) has also been used in Northern India and Pakistan for "grandfather". It is indeed derived from arya meaning "sir" in this case. Jain nuns are addressed either as Aryika or Ajji.

The word dādā (दादा دادا) also has a similar meaning which varies by region. It is used in some regions for "father", in other regions for "older brother", or even for "grandfather" in other regions. This word is an amalgam of two sources:

- Sanskrit tāta used to address intimate persons which means either "sir" or "dear".
- Tau meaning "father's older brother" is also derived from tāta.

The word baṛā (बड़ा بڑا "older, bigger, greater") is derived from the Sanskrit vr̥ddha through Prakrit vaḍḍha.

== Desi words ==
The term desi words is used to describe the component of the lexicon in Indo-Aryan languages which is non-Indo-Aryan in origin, but native to other language families of the Indian subcontinent. Examples of desi words in Hindustani include: lōṭā (लोटा لوٹا) "lota (water vessel)", kapās (कपास کپاس) "cotton", kauṛī (कौड़ी کَوڑی) "cowrie (shell money)", ṭhēs (ठेस ٹھیس) "wound, injury", jhaṇḍā (झंडा جھنڈا) "flag", mukkā (मुक्का مُکا) "fist, punch", lakṛī (लकड़ी لکڑی) "wood", ṭharrā (ठर्रा ٹھرّا) "tharra (liquor)", čūhā (चूहा چُوہا) "mouse, rat", čūlhā (चूल्हा چُولہا) "stove, oven", pagṛī (पगड़ी پگڑی) "turban", luṅgī (लुंगी لنگی) "lungi (sarong)", ghōṭālā (घोटाला گھوٹالہ) "scam", dāṇḍī (दांडी دانڈی) "salt", jhōlā (झोला جھولا) "bag, satchel", ṭakkar (टक्कर ٹکر) "crash, collision, confrontation", kākā (काका کاکا) "paternal uncle", uṭpaṭāṅg/ūṭpaṭāṅg (उटपटांग/ऊट-पटांग اُوٹ پٹانگ/اُٹ پٹانگ) "ludicrous", ḍabbā/ḍibbā (डब्बा/डिब्बा ڈبہ) "box, container" and jhuggī (झुग्गी جُھگی) "hut"

=== Onomatopoeic words ===
Nouns: gaṛbaṛ (गड़बड़ گڑبڑ) "disorder, disturbance", dhaṛām (धड़ाम دھڑام) "thud", bakbak (बक-बक بک بک) "chatter/chitter-chatter", khusur pusar (खुसुर-पुसर کُھسر پُسر) "whisper", jhilmil (झिलमिल جِھلمِل) "shimmer", ṭhakṭhak (ठक-ठक ٹھک ٹھک) "knock knock", khaṭpaṭ (खटपट کھٹپٹ) "quarrel, disagreement"
Verbs: khaṭkhaṭānā (खटखटाना کھٹکھٹانا) "to knock", gaḍgaḍānā (गडगडाना گڈگڈانا) "to rumble, to fuss", jagmagānā (जगमगाना جگمگانا) "to shine/glitter", hinhinānā (हिनहिनाना ہِنہِنانا) "to neigh", phusphusānā (फुसफुसाना پُھسپُھسانا) "to whisper"
Adjectives and Adverbs: čaṭpaṭ (चट-पट چٹ پٹ) "in a jiffy", tharthar (थर-थर تھر تھر) "with jerky motion (characteristic of shaking or trembling)", čaṭpaṭā (चटपटा چٹپٹا) "dextrous, spicy", čipčipā (चिपचिपा چِپچِپا) "sticky, slimy", čiṛčiṛā (चिड़चिड़ा چِڑچِڑا) "irritable", gaṛbaṛiyā (गड़बड़िया گڑبڑیا) "chaotic, messy"

== Loanwords ==
Due to the language's status as a lingua franca, Hindustani's vocabulary has a large inventory of loanwords, the largest number of which are adopted from Punjabi. Punjabi borrowings often bear sound changes from the parent Prakrit and Sanskrit vocabulary which did not occur in Hindustani, particularly the preservation of short vowels in initial syllables and the gemination of the following consonant. A certain amount of vocabulary from other South Asian languages, Persian, Arabic, and English has been loaned indirectly into Hindustani through Punjabi. Other Indic languages which exist in a state of diglossia with Hindustani and are prone to mutual borrowing include Rajasthani, the Western Pahari languages, Haryanvi, Bhojpuri, Marathi, Nepali, and Gujarati. Besides these, common sources of loan words include those manually adopted from Classical Sanskrit, Classical Persian, Arabic, Chagatai Turkic, Portuguese and English, as well as Mandarin Chinese and French to a lesser extent.

=== Classical Sanskrit ===
==== Phonetic alterations ====
Many Classical Sanskrit words which were not learned borrowings underwent phonetic alterations. In the vernacular form, these include the merger of Sanskrit श (śa) and ष (ṣa), ण (ṇa) and न (na) as well as ऋ (r̥) and रि (ri). Other common alterations were s͟h [/ʃ/] (श ش) becoming s [/s/] (स س), v/w [/ʋ/, /w/] (व و) becoming b [/b/] (ब ب) and y [/j/] (य ی) becoming j [/dʒ/] (ज ج). Short vowels were also sometimes introduced to break up consonant clusters. Such words in Hindi (and all other Indo-Aryan languages except Urdu, Lisan ud-Dawat, Dobhashi, etc.) are called ardhatatsama (Hindi: अर्धतत्सम, lit. 'semi-tatsama').

| Hindustani | | Meaning | Sanskrit | Corresponding Persian and Arabic loan |
| ardhatatsam | tatsam | Meaning | Sanskrit | Corresponding Persian and Arabic loan |
|---|---|---|---|---|
| baras (बरस برس) | varṣ (वर्ष) | year | वर्ष (varṣa) | sāl (साल سال), san (सन سَن) |
| des (देस دیس) | deś (देश) | country | देश (deśa) | mulk (मुल्क مُلک), vatan (वतन وطن) |
| bāsī (बासी باسی) | vāsī (वासी) | inhabitant | वासी (vāsī) | bās͟hindā (बाशिन्दा باشندہ) |
| jantar (जन्तर جنتر) | yantra (यन्त्र) | device | यन्त्र (yantra) | ālā (आला آلہ) |
| janam (जनम جنم) | janm (जन्म) | birth | जन्म (janma) | paidā'is͟h (पैदाइश پیدائش) |

=== Classical Persian ===
Persian words which were not later artificially added were loaned from Classical Persian (and perhaps, even from the Early New Persian), the historical variety of the tenth, eleventh and twelfth centuries, which continued to be used as literary language and lingua franca under the Persianate dynasties of the Late Middle Ages and Early Modern Era and is not the same as Iranian Persian (though the Dari Persian of Afghanistan is a direct descendant).

==== Borrowings ====
Persian loanwords in Hindustani are mainly borrowed nouns and adjectives as well as adverbs and conjunctions and some other parts of speech.

| Hindustani | Meaning | Persian | Corresponding Sanskrit loan |
|---|---|---|---|
| sāyā (साया سایہ) | shadow/shade | سایه (sāya) | čhāyā (छाया چھایا) |
| pares͟hān (परेशान پریشان) | anxious | پرِیشان (parēšān) | čintit (चिन्तित چِنتِت) |
| hames͟hā (हमेशा ہميشہ) | always/forever | همِیشه (hamēša) | sadaiv (सदैव سدَیو), sadā (सदा سدا) |
| k͟hus͟hī (ख़ुशी خوشی) | happiness | خوشی (xwašī) | ānand (आनन्द آنند), sukh (सुख سُکھ) |
| sabzī (सब्ज़ी سبزی) | vegetable | سبزی (sabzī) | sāg (साग ساگ), s͟hāk (शाक شاک) |
| mehrbān (मेहरबान مہربان) | kind | مهربان (mihrbān) | dayālu (दयालु دَیالو), karuṇāmaya (करुणामय کرُنامیَ) |
| agar (अगर اگر) | if | اگر (agar) | yadi (यदि یدی) |
| dīvār (दीवार دیوار) | wall | دیوار (dīwār) | bhīt (भीत بھیت) |
| darvāzā (दरवाज़ा دروازه) | door/gate | دروازه (darwāza) | dwār (द्वार دوار) |
| andar (अंदर اندر) | inside/in | اندر (andar) | bhītar (भीतर بھیتر) |
| tāzā (ताज़ा تازه) | fresh | تازه (tāza) | nirjar (निर्जर نِرجر), jarhīn (जरहीन جرہین) |
| roz (रोज़ روز) | day | روز (rōz) | din (दिन دِن), diwas (दिवस دِوس) |
| s͟hahr (शहर شہر) | city | شهر (šahr) | nagar (नगर نگر) |
| hind (हिंद/हिन्द ہِند) | India | هند (hind) | bhārat (भारत بھارت) |
| ki (कि کہ) | that (conjunction) | که (ki) | - |
| vāh (वाह واہ) | wow | واه (wāh) | - |

From stems:

Present:

| Hindustani | Meaning | Persian verb | Non-Persian alternative |
|---|---|---|---|
| par (पर پر) | wing | پریدن (parīdan, "to fly") | paṉkh (पंख پنکھ) |
| pasand (पसंद پسند) | liked, liking | پسندیدن (pasandīdan, "to prefer") | čahit (चहित چہِت), čāhat (चाहत چاہت) |
| k͟hwāb/k͟hāb (ख़्वाब/ख़ाब خواب) | dream | خوابیدن (xwābīdan, "to sleep") | sapnā (सपना سپنا), swapna (स्वप्न سوَپنہ) |

Past:

| Hindustani | Meaning | Persian verb | Non-Persian alternative |
|---|---|---|---|
| āmad (आमद آمد) | arrival | آمدن (āmadan, "to come") | āgaman (आगमन آگمن) |
| s͟hikast (शिकस्त شِکست) | defeat, defeated | شکستن (šikastan, "to break") | parājay (पराजय پراجَی), parājit (पराजित پراجِت), hār (हार ہار) |
| giraft (गिरफ़्त گِرفت) | grip, gripped | گرفتن (giriftan, "to grab") | pakaṛ (पकड़ پکڑ), jabt (जब्त جبت) |

From participles:

Present:

| Hindustani | Meaning | Persian verb | Non-Persian alternative |
|---|---|---|---|
| āyindā/āʾindā (आइन्दा آینده) | future | آمدن (āmadan, "to come") | bhaviṣya (भविष्य بھوِشیہ), āgāmī (आगामी آگامی) |
| parindā (परिन्दा پرِنده) | bird | پریدن (parīdan, "to fly") | pančhī (पंछी پنچھی), pakṣī (पक्षी پکشی) |
| zindā (ज़िन्दा زِنده) | living, alive | زیستن (zīstan, "to live") | jīvit (जीवित جیوِت), jīvant (जीवन्त جیونت) |

Past:

| Hindustani | Meaning | Persian verb | Non-Persian alternative |
|---|---|---|---|
| bastā (बस्ता بستہ) | bag, sack | بستن (bastan, "to bind") | thailā (थैला تھیلا) |
| pasandīdā (पसन्दीदा پسندیده) | favorite, favourite | پسندیدن (pasandīdan, "to prefer") | priya (प्रिय پریہ) |
| murdā (मुर्दा مُرده) | dead | مردن (murdan, "to die") | mr̥t (मृत مرت), hat (हत ہت) |

By adding noun suffix ـِش (-iš):

| Hindustani | Meaning | Persian verb | Non-Persian alternative |
|---|---|---|---|
| parvaris͟h (परवरिश پرورِش) | upbringing, rearing | پروردن (parwardan, "to foster") | pālanpoṣaṇ (पालन-पोषण پالن پوشن) |
| kos͟his͟h (कोशिश کوشِش) | effort, attempt | کوشیدن (kōšīdan, "to attempt") | prayās (प्रयास پریاس) |
| varzis͟h (वर्ज़िश ورزِش) | exercise | ورزیدن (warzīdan, "to exercise") | vyāyām (व्यायाम ویایام) |
| āzmāʾis͟h (आज़माइश آزمائش) | trial, test | آزمودن (āzmūdan, "to test") | vicāraṇ (विचारण وچارن), parīkṣaṇ (परीक्षण پریکشن) |

By forming composite words with Arabic:

| Hindustani | Meaning | Persian affix | Arabic element | Non-Persian alternative |
|---|---|---|---|---|
| k͟hūbsūrat (ख़ूबसूरत خوبصورت) | beautiful | خوب (xūb, "good") | صورت (sūrat, "appearance") | sundar (सुन्दर سُندر) |
| darasal (दरअसल دراصل) | actually | در (dar, "at, in") | اصل (asl, "reality") | vastutaḥ (वस्तुत: وستُتہ), vāstavik (वास्तविक واستوک) |
| fīsad (फ़ीसद فیصد) | percent | صد (sad, "hundred") | فی (fī, "in, at") | pratis͟hat (प्रतिशत پرتِشت), s͟hatans͟h (शतांश ستانش) |
| rahmdil (रहमदिल رحمدل) | compassionate | دل (dil, "heart") | رحم (rahm, "mercy") | kr̥pālū (कृपालु کرپالو), saday (सदय سدئے) |

==== Loaned Verbs ====
A substantial number of Hindustani verbs have been loaned from Punjabi, however, verb stems originating in less closely related languages are relatively rare. There are a few common verbs formed directly out of Persian stems (or nouns in some cases) listed below.

| Hindustani verb | Verb meaning | Persian stem | Stem meaning | Non-Persian alternative |
|---|---|---|---|---|
| k͟harīdnā (ख़रीदना خریدنا) | to buy | خرید (xarīd) - noun | buy, purchase | kīnnā (कीनना کیننا) kray karnā (क्रय करना کرئے کرنا), mol lenā (मोल लेना مول لینا) |
| guzārnā (गुज़ारना گُذارنا) | to pass (transitive), to spend | گذار (guẕār) | letting | bitānā (बिताना بِتانا) |
| cīk͟hnā (चीख़ना چیخنا) | to shout, to shriek, to yell, to call out | چیخ (čīx); an Indian variant of جیغ (jīġ) | scream, squawk | cillānā (चिल्लाना چلانا) |
| navāznā (नवाज़ना نوازنا) | to bestow, to patronize, to favor | نواز (nawāz) | playing, caressing | pradān karnā (प्रदान करना پرَدان کرنا), arpit karnā (अर्पित करना ارپِت کرنا), kr̥pā karnā (कृपा करना کرِپا کرنا), sahāyatā denā (सहायता देना سہایتا دینا) |
| s͟harmānā (शरमाना/शर्माना شرمانا) | to get ashamed, to shiver, to get shy, to get embarrassed, to hesitate, to get abashed, to have modesty, to get blushed, to get flushed, to get humbled | شرم (šarm) | shame, shivering, shyness, embarrassment, hesitation, abashment, modesty, getting blushed, getting flushed, getting humbled | jhē̃pnā (झेंपना جھینپْنا), lajnā (लजना لجنا), hicaknā (हिचकना ہچکنا), sakucnā (सकुचना سکچنا), lajjit karnā (लज्जित करना لجت کرنا), namr karnā (नम्र करना نمر کرنا), lāj karnā (लाज करना لاج کرنا), saṅkōc karnā (संकोच/सङ्कोच करना سنکوچ کرنا) |
| talās͟hnā (तलाशना تلاشنا) | to search, to investigate | تلاش (talāš) | search, investigation | ḍhū̃ṛhnā (ढूँढ़ना ڈھونڑھنا), khojnā (खोजना کھوجنا), patā lagānā (पता लगाना پتا لگانا), anveṣaṇ karnā (अन्वेषण करना انویشن کرنا) |
| guzarnā (गुज़रना گُذرنا) | to pass (intransitive), to occur | گذر (guẕar) | passing | bītnā (बीतना بِیتنا) |
| farmānā (फ़रमाना فرمانا) | to dictate, to say (formal) | فرما (farmā) | ordering, saying (formal) | āgyā karnā (आज्ञा करना آگیا کرنا), ādes͟h karnā (आदेश करना آدیش کرنا) |
| badalnā (बदलना بدلنا) | to change | بدل (badl) - noun | substitute, change | parivartan karnā (परिवर्तन करना پرِوَرتن کرنا), vinimay karnā (विनिमय करना وِنِمئے کرنا), palṭā denā (पलटा देना پلٹا دینا) |
| laraznā (लरज़ना لرزنا) | to tremble | لرز (laraz) | shivering | kā̃pnā (काँपना کانپنا) |
| guzrānnā (गुज़रानना گُذراننا) | to pass time, to present, to adduce | گذران (guẕarān) | passing time | prastut karnā (प्रस्तुत करना پرستُت کرنا), sāmne rakhnā (सामने रखना سامنے رکھنا) |

==== Arabic ====
Some of the most commonly used words from Arabic, most of them (but not all) entering the language through Persian, include:

| Word (Latin) | Hindi/Urdu | Meaning | Non-Arabic alternative |
|---|---|---|---|
| vaqt | वक़्त / وقت | time | samay (समय / سمے) |
| qalam | क़लम / قلم | pen | lekhani (लेखनी / لکھنی) |
| kitāb | किताब / کتاب | book | pustak (पुस्तक / پستک) |
| qarīb | क़रीब / قریب | near | samīp (समीप / سمیپ) |
| sahīh/sahī | सही / صحیح | correct | yathārth (यथार्थ / یتھارتھ) |
| g͟harīb | ग़रीब / غریب | poor | daridra (दरिद्र / دردر) |
| amīr | अमीर / امیر | rich | dhanik (धनिक / دھنک) |
| duniyā | दुनिया / دنیا | world | jagat (जगत / جگت) |
| hisāb | हिसाब / حساب | calculation | gaṇanā (गणना / گننا) |
| qudrat | क़ुदरत / قدرت | nature | prakṛti (प्रकृति / پرکرتی) |
| nasīb | नसीब / نصیب | fate | bhāgya (भाग्य / بھاگے) |
| ajīb | अजीब / عجیب | strange | vicitra (विचित्र / وچتر) |
| qānūn | क़ानून / قانون | law | vidhi (विधि / ودھی) |
| filhāl | फ़िलहाल / فی الحال | currently | vartamān (वर्तमान / ورتمان) |
| sirf | सिर्फ़ / صرف | only | keval (केवल / کیول) |
| taqrīban | तक़रीबन / تقریبًا | about | lagbhag (लगभग / لگ بھگ) |
| k͟habar | ख़बर / خبر | news | samācār (समाचार / سماچار) |
| ak͟hbār | अख़बार / اخبار | newspaper | patra (पत्र / پتر) |
| qilā | क़िला / قلعہ | fort | durg (दुर्ग / درگ) |
| kursī | कुर्सी / کرسی | chair | āsandī (आसन्दी / آسندی) |
| s͟harbat | शर्बत / شربت | drink | peya (पेय / پے) |
| mu'āf/ma'āf/māf | मुआफ़ / मआफ़ / माफ़ / معاف | forgiven | kṣam (क्षम / کشم) |
| zarūrī | ज़रूरी / ضروری | necessary | āvaśyak (आवश्यक / آوشیک) |

==== Chagatai Turkic ====
There are a very small number of Turkic words in Hindustani, numbering as little as 24 according to some sources, all entering the language through Persian. Other words attributed to Turkish, the most widely spoken Turkic language, are actually words which are common to Hindustani and Turkish but are of non-Turkic origins, mostly Perso-Arabic. Both languages also share mutual loans from English. Most notably, some honorifics and surnames (especially of Muslims) common in Hindustani are Turkic due to the influence of the ethnically Turkic Mughals - these include k͟hānam (ख़ानम خانم) "empress, khanum", bājī (बाजी باجی) "younger sister" and bēgam (बेगम بیگم) "queen, begum". Common surnames include k͟hān (ख़ान خان), čug͟htāʾī (चुग़ताई چغتائی), pās͟hā (पाशा پاشا), and arsalān (अर्सलान ارسلان). Common Turkic words used in everyday Hindustani are qaiñčī (क़ैंची قینچی) "scissors", qulī (क़ुली قلی) "slave, servant, coolie", annā (अन्ना انّا) "governess", tamg͟hā (तमग़ा تمغا) "stamp, medal, tamga", and čaqmaq (चक़मक़ چقمق) "flint".

=== Mandarin Chinese ===
There are not many Chinese words that were loaned into Hindustani in spite of geographical proximity.

| Hindustani | Meaning | Chinese/Sinitic | Note |
|---|---|---|---|
| cāy/cāʾe (चाय چائے/چاۓ) | tea, chai | 茶 (chá) | Derived through Persian چای (čāy) |
| cīn (चीन چین) | China | 秦 (qín) | Derived through Sanskrit चीन (cīna), and also influenced by Persian چین (čīn) |
| līcī (लीची لِیچی) | lychee | 茘枝 (lìzhī) | |

=== European languages ===
==== Portuguese ====
A small number of Hindustani words were derived from Portuguese due to interaction with colonists and missionaries. These include the following:

| Hindustani | Meaning | Portuguese |
|---|---|---|
| anannās/anānās (अनन्नास/अनानास اناناس/انناس) | pineapple | ananás |
| pādrī (पाद्री پادری) | priest | padre |
| bālṭī (बाल्टी بالٹی) | bucket | balde |
| čābī (चाबी چابی) | key | chave |
| girjā (गिर्जा گِرجا) | church | igreja |
| almārī (अलमारी الماری) | cupboard | almário, armário |
| botal (बोतल بوتل) | bottle | botelha |
| aspatāl (अस्पताल اسپتال) | hospital | hospital |
| olandez/valandez (ओलन्देज़/वलन्देज़ ولندیز/اولندیز) | Dutch | holandês |

==== French ====
A few French loans exist in Hindustani resulting from French colonial settlements in India. Other French words such as s͟hemīz (शेमीज़ شیمِیز) "chemise" and kūpan (कूपन کُوپن) "coupon" have entered the language through English.

| Hindustani | Meaning | French |
|---|---|---|
| kārtūs (कारतूस کارتُوس) | cartridge | cartouche |
| restorāṉ (रेस्तोरां/रेस्तोराँ ریستوراں) | restaurant | restaurant |

=== English ===
Loanwords from English were borrowed through interaction with the British East India Company and later British rule. English-language education for the native administrative and richer classes during British rule accelerated the adoption of English vocabulary in Hindustani. Many technical and modern terms were and still are borrowed from English, such as ḍākṭar/ḍôkṭar (डाक्टर/डॉक्टर ڈاکٹر) "doctor", ṭaiksī/ṭêksī (टैक्सी/टॅक्सी ٹَیکسی) "taxi", and kilomīṭar (किलोमीटर کِلومِیٹر) "kilometer".

==== Photo-semantic matching ====
Some loanwords from English undergo a significant phonetic transformation. This can either be done intentionally, in order to nativise words or to make them sound more or less "English-sounding", or happen naturally. Words often undergo a phonetic change in order to make them easier for native speakers to pronounce while others change due to a lack of English education or incomplete knowledge of English phonetics, where an alternate pronunciation becomes an accepted norm and overtakes the original as the most used pronunciation.

| Hindustani | English |
|---|---|
| darjan (दर्जन درجن) (Note: With intrusive hypercorrectional 'r' via arhotic British English) | dozen |
| tijorī (तिजोरी تِجوری) | treasury |
| sataltā (सतलता ستلتا) | subtlety |
| mācis (माचिस ماچِس) | match(es) |
| godām (गोदाम گودام) | godown |
| bigul (बिगुल بِگُل) | bugle |
| raṅgrūṭ (रंगरूट رنگرُوٹ) | recruit |
| ṭamāṭar (टमाटर ٹماٹر) | tomato |
| kābīnā (काबीना کابینہ) | cabinet |
| ketlī (केतली کیتلی) | kettle |
| darāz (दराज़ دراز) | drawer(s) |
| bam (बम بم) | bomb |
| lālṭen (लालटेन لالٹین) | lantern |
| būcaṛ (बूचड़ بُوچڑ) | butcher |
| ṭaṅkī (टंकी ٹنکی) | tank |
| baksā (बक्सा بکسا) | box |
| janvarī (जनवरी جنوری) | January |

== Usage Example ==
Comparison of different modern Khariboli registers using the same sentence
| Language | Sentence (in Latin script) | Remarks |
|---|---|---|
| English | The clouds of our country shower blessings on this land. | |
| Modern Standard Hindi | Hamārē rāṣṭra kē mēgh is bhūmi par vardān varṣātē ha͠i. (Devanagari: हमारे राष्ट्र के मेघ इस भूमि पर वरदान वर्षाते हैं।) | Highly Sanskritised variety with tatsama vocabulary (although MSH does also employ native tadbhava vocabulary as well), generally preferred for formal purposes by followers of Dharmic religions, Sanskritists and linguistic purists and puritanists alike. |
| Hindustani | Hamārē dēs kā bādal is dhartī par vardān/barkat barsātē ha͠i. | Colloquial variety with native tadbhava vocabulary, with a substantial number of loanwords from both tatsama vocabulary, as well as from Persian and Arabic (and to some extent, even Turkic), as seen (to some extent) in Ganga-Jamuni tehzeeb. |
| Hinglish/Urdish | Hamārē country kē clouds is land par blessings shower kartē ha͠i. | Heavy code-mixing with English words and phrases. |
| Standard Urdu | Hamārē mulk ke abr is zamīn par raḥmat nāzil kartē ha͠i. (Nastaliq: ہمارے ملک کے ابر اس زمین پر رحمت نازل کرتے ہیں۔) | Highly Persianised and Arabised variety, mostly preferred for formal purposes by followers of Islam and people in a Persianate culture and setting. |

== Citations ==
=== Sources ===
- Hindi Language and Literature, a site about Hindi's usage, dialects, and history by Dr. Yashwant K. Malaiya, Professor at Colorado State University, Fort Collins, CO, USA.
- Hindi Language Resources A comprehensive site on the Hindi language built by Yashwant Malaiya
- Indian Department of Official Language
- Dua, Hans R. (1994a). Hindustani. In Asher (Ed.) (pp. 1554)
- Liberman, Anatoly. (2004). Word Origins ... and How We Know Them: Etymology for Everyone. Delhi: Oxford University Press. ISBN 0-19-561643-X.
- Rai, Amrit. (1984). A house divided: The origin and development of Hindi-Hindustani. Delhi: Oxford University Press. ISBN 0-19-561643-X.
- Kuczkiewicz-Fraś, Agnieszka. (2003). "Perso-Arabic Hybrids in Hindi. The Socio-linguistic and Structural Analysis". Delhi: Manohar. ISBN 81-7304-498-8.
- Kuczkiewicz-Fraś, Agnieszka. (2008). "Perso-Arabic Loanwords in Hindustani. Part I: Dictionary". Kraków: Księgarnia Akademicka. ISBN 978-83-7188-161-9.
- Kuczkiewicz-Fraś, Agnieszka. (2012). "Perso-Arabic Loanwords in Hindustani. Part II: Linguistic Study". Kraków: Księgarnia Akademicka. ISBN 978-83-7638-294-4.
