= Hinglish =

Mixing of Hindi and English spoken in India

Hinglish is the macaronic hybrid use of colloquial Hindi and English. Its name is a portmanteau of the words Hindi and English. In spoken contexts, it typically involves code-mixing or code-switching between these languages whereby they are freely interchanged within a sentence or between sentences.

In written contexts, Hinglish colloquially refers to Romanised Hindi—Hindustani written in Roman script (i.e., English alphabet), instead of the traditional scripts such as Devanagari or Nastaliq—often with English lexical borrowings.

The word Hinglish was first recorded in 1967. Other colloquial portmanteau words for Hindustani-influenced English include: Hindish (recorded from 1972), Hindlish (1985), Henglish (1993) and Hinlish (2013).

In the present day, Hinglish has become the de facto style of Hindustani spoken in urban areas of northern India as well as contemporary Bollywood, to the extent that even nouns and verbs that have native colloquial equivalents are often replaced with English words.

In modern-day India, since English is perceived as the prestige language over Indian languages by common people, Hinglish subsequently is perceived as the high prestige variety of spoken Hindi, while vernacular Hindustani (without English influence) is perceived as a low variety of spoken Hindi.

== Outside India ==
=== Pakistan ===
When Hindi–Urdu is viewed as a single spoken language (Hindustani), the portmanteaus Hinglish and Urdish may mean the same code-mixed tongue, though the latter term is commonly used in Pakistan to precisely refer to a mixture of English with the Urdu sociolect.

=== Beyond South Asia ===
While the term Hinglish is based on the prefix of Hindi, it does not refer exclusively to Modern Standard Hindi, but is used in the Indian subcontinent with other Indo-Aryan languages as well, and also by "British South Asian families to enliven standard English".

== Example ==
Comparison of different modern Khariboli registers using the same sentence
| Language | Sentence (in Latin script) | Remarks |
|---|---|---|
| English | The clouds of our country shower blessings on this land. | |
| Modern Standard Hindi | Hamārē rāṣṭra kē mēgh is bhūmi par vardān varṣātē ha͠i. (Devanagari: हमारे राष्ट्र के मेघ इस भूमि पर वरदान वर्षाते हैं।) | Highly Sanskritised variety with tatsama vocabulary (although MSH does also employ native tadbhava vocabulary as well), generally preferred for formal purposes by followers of Dharmic religions, Sanskritists and linguistic purists and puritanists alike. |
| Hindustani | Hamārē dēs kā bādal is dhartī par vardān/barkat barsātē ha͠i. | Colloquial variety with native tadbhava vocabulary, with a substantial number of loanwords from both tatsama vocabulary, as well as from Persian and Arabic (and to some extent, even Turkic), as seen (to some extent) in Ganga-Jamuni tehzeeb. |
| Hinglish | Hamārē country kē clouds is land par blessings shower kartē ha͠i. | Heavy code-mixing with English words and phrases. |

== History and evolution ==
=== Background ===
Hindustani has an approximately ten-century history. In this period, it has accommodated several linguistic influences. Contact with Sanskrit, Prakrit, Pali, Apabhraṃśa, Persian, Arabic and Turkic languages has led to historical 'mixes' or fusions, e.g., Hindustani, Rekhta. Linguistic fusions were celebrated by Bhakti poets, in approximately the 15th-17th centuries as 'Khichdi Boli' – or amalgamated speech.

=== Colonial era ===
At the turn of the 18th century, with the rising dominion of the East India Company, also called 'Company Raj' (literally, 'Company Rule'), the languages of India were brought into contact with the foreign element of English. In colonized India, English became a symbol of authority and a powerful hegemonic tool to propagate British culture, including Christianity. The political ascendancy of the British extended into social and professional roles; this meant that the legal proceedings, as well as the studies in medicine and science, were conducted in English.

This led to an interest in the promotion of English into the society of Indian natives. Educated Indians, or 'Brown Sahibs', wished to participate in academia and pursue professional careers. Raja Ram Mohan Roy, a social and education reformer, advocated that English be taught to Indians by certain British gentlemen for the benefit and instruction of the native Indians. Charles Grant, the president of the East India Company's board of control, championed the cause of English education as a "cure for darkness" where "darkness" was "Hindoo ignorance". The Charter Act was passed in 1813. This legalized missionary work by the company, including the introduction of English education. By the beginning of the twentieth century, English had become the unifying language in the Indian struggle for independence against the British.

Meanwhile, English was on its way to becoming the first global lingua franca. By the end of the twentieth century, it had special status in seventy countries, including India. Worldwide, English began to represent modernization and internationalization, with more and more jobs requiring basic fluency in it. In India especially, the language came to acquire a social prestige, 'a class apart of education', which prompted native Indian or South Asian speakers to turn bilingual, speaking their mother tongue at home or in a local context, but English in academic or work environments.

In the late 19th century, Bharatendu Harishchandra, often considered the father of modern Hindi, wrote poems in Hinglish, combining languages and scripts.

The contact of South Asian languages, which is a category that refers inclusively to Hindi and all other Indian languages, with English, led to the emergence of the linguistic phenomenon now known as Hinglish. Many common Indic words such as 'pyjamas', 'karma', 'guru', 'pandit/pundit' and 'yoga' were incorporated into English usage, and vice versa ('road', 'sweater', and 'plate'). This is in parallel with several other similar hybrids around the world, like Spanglish (Spanish + English) and Taglish (Tagalog + English). A fair share of the words borrowed into English from Indian languages were themselves borrowed from Persian and Arabic (or even Turkic). An example of this is the widely used English word 'pyjamas/pajamas' which originates from Persian pāyjāma, literally "leg clothing," from pāy/pā "leg" (from PIE root *ped- "foot") + jāma "clothing, garment."

=== Contemporary era ===
A poster for the 1943 Bollywood film Kismet, which features the movie's name written in Latin, Devanagari, and Arabic scripts. (in Hunterian: qismat)

In recent years, due to an increase in literacy and connectivity, the interchange of languages has reached new heights, especially due to increasing online immersion. English is the most widely used language on the internet, and this is a further impetus to the use of Hinglish online by native Hindi speakers, especially among the youth. Google's Gboard mobile keyboard app gives an option of Hinglish as a typing language where one can type a Hindi sentence in the Roman script and suggestions will be Hindi words but in the Roman script. In 2021, Google rolled out support for Romanized Hindi on its search engine and on the Google Pay app. Phrases such as "Naya Payment" for "New Payment" and "Transaction History Dekhein" for "See Transaction History" are used.

While Hinglish has arisen from the presence of English in India, it is not merely Hindi and English spoken side by side, but a language type in itself, like all linguistic fusions. Aside from the borrowing of vocabulary, there is the phenomenon of switching between languages, called code-switching and code-mixing, direct translations, adapting certain words, and infusing the flavours of each language into each other.

The Indian English variety, or simply Hinglish, is the Indian adaption of English in a very endocentric manner, which is why it is popular among the youth. Like other dynamic language mixes, Hinglish is now thought to 'have a life of its own'.

Hinglish used to be limited to informal contexts and ads, but it is now also used in university classrooms.

== Computational analysis ==
With its widespread use in social media such as blogs, Facebook and X (formerly Twitter), the analysis of Hinglish using computers has become important in a number of natural language processing applications like machine translation and speech-to-speech translation.

== Users ==
Hinglish is more commonly heard in urban and semi-urban centers of northern India. It is also spoken to some extent as an easier-to-learn variant of Hindi by South Indians and members of the South Asian diaspora who are more comfortable with English. Research into the linguistic dynamics of India shows that while the use of English is on the rise, there are more people fluent in Hinglish than in pure English. David Crystal, a British linguist at the University of Wales, projected in 2004 that at about 350 million, the world's Hinglish speakers may soon outnumber native English speakers.

In India, Romanised Hindi is the dominant form of expression online. In an analysis of YouTube comments, Palakodety et al., identified that 52% of comments were in Romanised Hindi, 46% in English, and 1% in Devanagari Hindi. Romanised Hindi is also used by some newspapers such as The Times of India. The first novel written in this format, All We Need Is Love, was published in 2015. Romanised Hindi has been supported by advertisers in part because it allows a message to be conveyed in a neutral script to both Hindi and Urdu speakers. Other reasons for adoption of Romanised Hindi are the prevalence of Roman-script digital keyboards and corresponding lack of Indic-script keyboards in most mobile phones.

Hinglish has become increasingly accepted at the governmental level in India as an alternative to Sanskritised Hindi; in 2011, the Home Ministry gave permission to officials to use English words in their Hindi notes, so long as they are written in Devanagari script.

== See also ==
- Creole language
- Hobson-Jobson
- Translanguaging
- Englishization
