= Jhamar =

Jhamar may refer to:

- the former Jamar State, and a village, on Saurashtra, in Gujarat, western India
- the Jhamar caste

== See also ==
- Jhumair (disambiguation)
