= Bandhmati =

Regions with significant populations
- India

Languages
- • Hindi • Khari boli

Religion
- • Hinduism

Related ethnic groups
- • Muslim Bandhmati • Bansphor • Banjara

The Bandhmati are a Hindu caste found in the state of Uttar Pradesh in India. They are also known as Banbasi.

== Origin ==
The Bandhmati are a caste that are traditionally involved in the manufacture of ropes. According to some traditions, they are a community of Banjaras that took to the manufacture of ropes as such became an endogamous sub-group. The Bandhmati are found mainly in Saharanpur District, and are mostly Hindu, with the exception of a small group of Muslim Bandhmati. Their main tribal deity is Balmiki. The Bandhmati speak the Khari boli dialect of Hindi, although most of the community both speak and understand standard Hindi.

== Present circumstances ==
The Bandhmati practice strict community endogamy, as well as clan exogamy, which is a common practice among most North Indian Hindus. They live in multi-caste villages, but occupy their own distinct quarters. Each of their settlement contains an informal caste council, known as a panchayat, sometimes also called a sabha or association. The panchayat is headed by a chaudhary, a position which is elective. As an institution, the main function of the panchayat is to resolve any intra-community dispute, as well as acting an instrument of social control.

The Banndhmati are still involved in their traditional occupation, which is the manufacture of ropes. These are then sold at the local market. The raw material for the manufacture of the ropes is obtained from government owned forest, for which the community require licences. A significant number of Bandhmati are agricultural labourers, while other often migrating to Mumbai and Delhi to work as daily wage labourers. Like other scheduled caste communities, they live an extremely marginal economic existence. A small number of Bandhmati have also become poultry farmers, selling their produce in the towns nearest to their settlements.

== See also ==
- Bansphor
- Muslim Bandhmati
- Jhamar caste
