= Jhumair (disambiguation) =

Jhumair may refer to:

- Jhumar song, folk songs of East Indian aboriginals
- Jhumair, folk dance of Chotanagpur
- Jhumar, folk dance of Multan, Balochistan and Punjab

== See also ==
- Jhamar (disambiguation)
