= Muslim Bandhmati =

Bandhmati Musalman
Regions with significant populations
- India

Religion
- Islam

Related ethnic groups
- Bandhmati

The Bandhmati are a Muslim community found in the state of Uttar Pradesh in India. They are a sub-group of the mainly Hindu Bandhmati caste.

== See also ==
- Bandhmati
