= Sahasra =

Vedic measure of Count data

- Unit system: Arthashastra
- Unit of: Count data
- Symbol: Sahasra

Conversions
1 Sahasra in ...	... is equal to ...
- SI units: 1000
- Imperial/US units: 1000; 1000

A Sahasra (Sanskrit: सहस्र) is a Vedic measure of Count data, which was chiefly used in ancient as well as medieval India. A Sahasra means 1k, i.e. 1000 count data

== See also ==
- Hindu cosmology
- History of measurement systems in India
- Hindu units of time
- Palya
- Rajju
- Sayana
- List of numbers in Hindu scriptures
