= Jhamar (caste) =

Hindu caste in India

The Jhamar are a Hindu caste found in the state of Uttar Pradesh in India. They are also known as Jhaunwar.

== Origin ==
The Jhamar are an occupational Hindu caste traditionally associated with basket-making. According to some traditions, the word Jhamar is a corruption of the Hindi word jhaua, which means a basket. The Jhamar themselves claim to be Lodhas, who took up the occupation of basket making. Over time this change of occupation led to the formation of a distinct community. The Jhamar are involved in the making of baskets from the twigs of the Arhar plant. They are a small community, found mainly in the districts of Barabanki, Lucknow and Unnao. The Jhamar speak Awadhi among themselves and Hindi with outsiders.

== Present Circumstances ==
The Jhamar are strictly endogamous and practice clan exogamy. They are a landless community, with basket making still their principal occupation. A significant number of Jhamar are now daily wage labourers, involved in occupations such as rickshaw pulling. Each Jhamar settlement also contains a biradari panchayat, an informal caste association, which acts as an instrument of social control.

== See also ==
- Bandhmati
