= Hindustani language =

Indo-Aryan language

Hindustani
- Hindi–Urdu
- हिन्दुस्तानी; ہندوستانی
- The word Hindustani in the Devanagari and the Nastaliq-style Perso-Arabic scripts
- Pronunciation: [ɦɪnd̪ʊst̪ɑːniː]
- Native to: South Asia
- Region: Western Uttar Pradesh/Delhi (Hindustani Belt) and Deccan, Pakistan
- Speakers: L1 speakers: c. 250 million (2011 & 2017 censuses); L2 speakers: ~500 million (1999–2016)
- Language family: Indo-European: Indo-Iranian; Indo-Aryan; Central Zone; Western Hindi; Hindustani
- Early forms: Shauraseni Prakrit: Apabhraṃśa; Old Hindi
- Standard forms: Modern Standard Hindi; Urdu
- Dialects: Andaman Creole Hindi; Arunachali Hindi; Begamati; Bihari Hindi (Note: Not to be confused with the Bihari languages, a group of Eastern Indo-Aryan languages.); Bangluri Hindi; Bombay Hindi; Dhakaiya Urdu; Deccani; Haflong Hindi; Hyderabadi Urdu; Kalkatiya Urdu; Karkhandari Urdu; Kauravi; Judeo-Urdu; Rekhta; Dakshina Hindi (Madrasi and Kerala Hindi)
- Writing system: Brahmic Devanagari (Hindi alphabet); Perso-Arabic Nastaliq (Urdu alphabet) (Urdu); Kaithi (historical); Bengali–Assamese script (for Eastern Hindi in East India and Urdu in Bangladesh); Indo-Hebrew (Judeo-Urdu); Laṇḍā (historical); Hindi Braille; Urdu Braille; Latin script (Roman Urdu)
- Signed forms: Indian Signing System (ISS)

Official status
- Official language in: India (as Hindi and Urdu); Pakistan (as Urdu); Fiji (as Fijian Hindustani)
- Recognised minority language in: South Africa (Hindi and Urdu - protected language); United Arab Emirates (Hindi - third official court language)
- Regulated by: Central Hindi Directorate (Hindi, India); National Council for Promotion of Urdu Language (Urdu, India); National Language Promotion Department (Urdu, Pakistan)

Language codes
- ISO 639-3: –
- Glottolog: hind1270
- Linguasphere: 59-AAF-qa
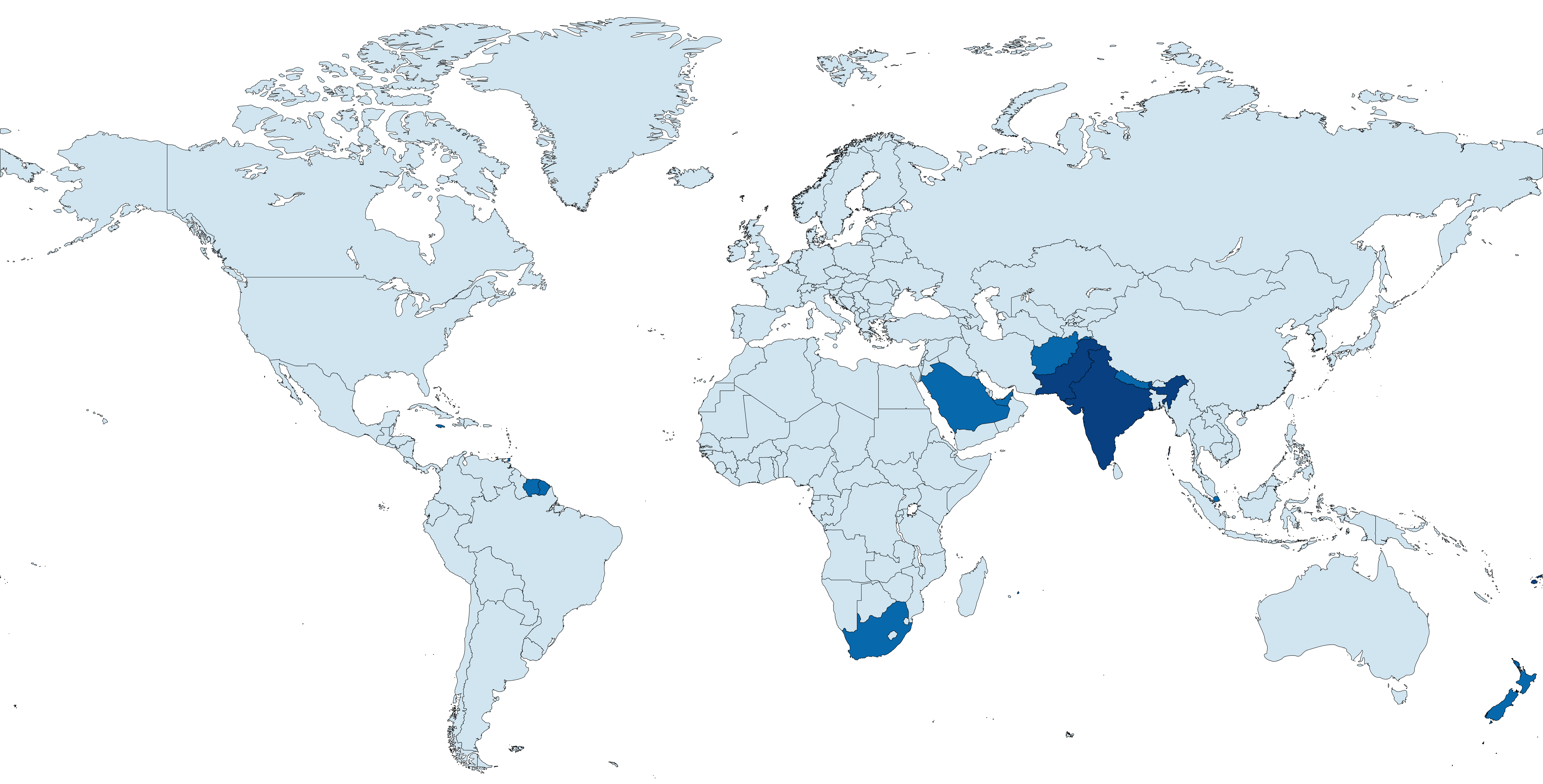
- Spread of Hindustani across the world Majority/Official language Significant Minority/Recognised language Minority language

Hindustani (Note: Pronounced /ˌhɪnduˈstɑːni, -ˈstæni/) (Note: Devanagari: हिन्दुस्तानी, (Note: Also written as हिंदुस्तानी) Nastaliq: ہندوستانی, (Note: This will only display in a Nastaliq font if one is installed, otherwise it may display in a modern Arabic font in a style more common for writing Arabic.) transliteration: Hindustānī, pronounced [ɦɪnd̪ʊst̪ɑːniː], lit. 'of Hindustan') is an Indo-Aryan language from the Indo-European language family native to the Hindi-Urdu Belt, and spoken across North, Central, West, and East India, as well as in Pakistan, as a lingua franca of the region. It is also spoken by a minority Deccani-speaking community which extends into South India. Hindustani is a pluricentric language with two standard registers, known as Hindi (Prakritised and Sanskritised register written in the Devanagari script) and Urdu (Persianised and Arabised register written in the Perso-Arabic script), both of which are official languages of India, with the latter also serving as the national language of Pakistan. Thus, it is also called Hindi–Urdu. Colloquial registers of the language fall on a spectrum between these standards.

The concept of a Hindustani language as a "unifying language" or "fusion language" that could transcend communal and religious divisions across the subcontinent was endorsed by Mahatma Gandhi, as it was not seen to be associated with either the Hindu or Muslim communities as was the case with Hindi and Urdu respectively, and it was also considered a simpler language for people to learn. The conversion from Hindi to Urdu (or vice versa) is generally achieved by merely transliterating between the two scripts. Translation, on the other hand, is generally only required for religious and literary texts.

Scholars trace the language's first written poetry, in the form of Old Hindi, to the Delhi Sultanate era around the twelfth and thirteenth century. During the period of the Delhi Sultanate, which covered most of today's India, eastern Pakistan, southern Nepal and Bangladesh and which resulted in the Hindu-Muslim cultures, the Prakrit base of Old Hindi became enriched with loanwords from Persian, Arabic and Turkic, evolving into the present form of Hindustani. The Hindustani vernacular became an expression of Indian national unity during the Indian Independence movement, and continues to be spoken as the common language of the people of the northern Indian subcontinent, which is reflected in the Hindustani vocabulary of Bollywood films and songs.

The language's core vocabulary is derived from Prakrit and Sanskrit (via Prakrit), with substantial loanwords from Persian and Arabic (via Persian). It is often written in the Devanagari script or Nastaliq script in the case of Hindi and Urdu respectively, with romanisation increasingly employed in modern times as a neutral script.

As of 2025, Hindi and Urdu together constitute the 3rd-most-spoken language in the world after English and Mandarin, with 855 million native and second-language speakers, according to Ethnologue, though this includes millions who self-reported their language as 'Hindi' on the Indian census but speak a number of other Hindi languages than Hindustani. The total number of Hindustani speakers was reported to be over 300 million in 1995, making Hindustani the third- or fourth-most spoken language in the world.

== History ==
Early forms of present-day Hindustani developed from the Middle Indo-Aryan Apabhraṃśa vernaculars of present-day North India in the 7th–13th centuries. Hindustani emerged as a contact language around the Ganges-Yamuna Doab (Delhi, Meerut and Saharanpur), a result of the increasing linguistic diversity that occurred during the Muslim period in the Indian subcontinent. Amir Khusrau, who lived in the thirteenth century during the Delhi Sultanate period in North India, used these forms (which was the lingua franca of the period) in his writings and referred to it as Hindavi (Persian: ھندوی, lit. 'of Hindus or Indians'). By the end of the century, the military exploits of Alauddin Khalji, introduced the language in the Deccan region, which led to the development of its southern dialect Deccani, which was promoted by Muslim rulers in the Deccan. The Delhi Sultanate, which comprised several Turkic and Afghan dynasties that ruled much of the subcontinent from Delhi, was succeeded by the Mughal Empire in 1526 and preceded by the Ghurid dynasty and Ghaznavid Empire before that.

Ancestors of the language were known as Hindui, Hindavi, Zabān-e Hind (transl. 'Language of India'), Zabān-e Hindustan (transl. 'Language of Hindustan'), Hindustan ki boli (transl. 'Language of Hindustan'), Rekhta, and Hindi. Its regional dialects became known as Zabān-e Dakhani in southern India, Zabān-e Gujari (transl. 'Language of Gujars') in Gujarat, and as Zabān-e Dehlavi or Urdu around Delhi. It is an Indo-Aryan language, deriving its base from the Western Hindi dialect of the Ganges-Yamuna Doab (Delhi, Meerut and Saharanpur) known as Khariboli—the contemporary form being classed under the umbrella of Old Hindi.

Although the Mughals were of Timurid (Gūrkānī) Turco-Mongol descent, they were Persianised, and Persian had gradually become the state language of the Mughal empire after Babur. Mughal patronage led to a continuation and reinforcement of Persian by Central Asian Turkic rulers in the Indian Subcontinent, since Persian was also patronised by the earlier Turko-Afghan Delhi Sultanate who laid the basis for the introduction and use of Persian in the subcontinent.

Hindustani began to take shape as a Persianised vernacular during the Delhi Sultanate (1206–1526 AD) and Mughal Empire (1526–1858 AD) in South Asia. Hindustani retained the grammar, as well as the core Sanskritic and Prakritic vocabulary, of the local Indian language of the Ganges-Yamuna Doab called Khariboli. However, as an emerging common dialect, Hindustani absorbed large numbers of Persian, Arabic, and Turkic loanwords, and as Mughal conquests grew it spread as a lingua franca across much of northern India; this was a result of the contact of Hindu and Muslim cultures in Hindustan that created a composite Ganga-Jamuni tehzeeb. The language was also known as Rekhta, or 'mixed', which implies that the Sanskritic and Prakritic vocabulary base of Old Hindi was mixed with Persian loanwords. Written in the Devanagari, Perso-Arabic, and occasionally Kaithi or Gurmukhi scripts, it remained the primary lingua franca of northern India for the next four centuries, although it varied significantly in vocabulary depending on the local language. Alongside Persian, it achieved the status of a literary language in Muslim courts and was also used for literary purposes in various other settings such as Sufi, Nirgun Sant, Krishna Bhakta circles, and Rajput Hindu courts. Its major centres of development included the Mughal courts of Delhi, Lucknow, Agra and Lahore as well as the Rajput courts of Amber and Jaipur.

In the 18th century, towards the end of the Mughal period, with the fragmentation of the empire and the elite system, a variant of Hindustani, one of the successors of Apabhraṃśa vernaculars at Delhi, and nearby cities, came to gradually replace Persian as the lingua franca among the educated elite upper class particularly in northern India, though Persian still retained much of its pre-eminence for a short period. The term Hindustani was given to that language. The Perso-Arabic script form of this language underwent a standardisation process and further Persianisation during this period (18th century) and came to be known as Urdu, a name derived from Persian: Zabān-i-Urdū-i-Mu'alla ('language of the court') or Zabān-i-Urdū (زبان اردو, 'language of the camp'). The etymology of the word Urdū is of Chagatai origin, Ordū ('camp'), cognate with English horde, and known in local translation as Lashkarī Zabān (لشکری زبان), which is shortened to Lashkari (لشکری). This is all due to its origin as the common speech of the Mughal army. As a literary language, Urdu took shape in courtly, elite settings. Along with English, it became an official language of northern parts of British India in 1837.

According to Portuguese sources, the speech of the subcontinental Muslims who spoke this language was identified as Lashkari-Hindustani (لشکری-ہندوستانی۔) by both the native speakers and outsiders to the region alike.

Hindi as a standardised literary register of the Hindustani arose in the 19th century. While the first literary works (mostly translations of earlier works) in Sanskritised Hindustani were already written in the early 19th century as part of a literary project that included both Hindu and Muslim writers (e.g. Lallu Lal, Insha Allah Khan), the call for a distinct Sanskritised standard of Hindustani written in Devanagari under the name of Hindi became increasingly politicised in the course of the century and gained pace around 1880 in an effort to displace Urdu's official position.

John Fletcher Hurst in his book published in 1891 mentioned that the Hindustani or camp language of the Mughal Empire's courts at Delhi was not regarded by philologists as a distinct language but only as a dialect of Hindi with admixture of Persian. He continued: "But it has all the magnitude and importance of separate language. It is linguistic result of Muslim rule of eleventh & twelfth centuries and is spoken by many Hindus in North India and by Musalman population in all parts of India." Next to English it was the official language of British Indian Empire, was commonly written in Perso-Arabic characters, and was spoken by approximately a hundred million people. The process of hybridisation also led to the formation of words in which the first element of the compound was from Khari Boli and the second from Persian, such as rājmaḥal 'palace' (rāj 'royal, king' + maḥal 'house, place') and raṅgmaḥal 'fashion house' (raṅg 'colour, dye' + maḥal 'house, place'). As Muslim rule expanded, Hindustani speakers traveled to distant parts of India as administrators, soldiers, merchants, and artisans. As it reached new areas, Hindustani further hybridised with local languages. In the Deccan, for instance, Hindustani blended with Telugu and came to be called Dakhani. In Dakhani, aspirated consonants were replaced with their unaspirated counterparts; for instance, dekh 'see' became dek, ghula 'dissolved' became gula, kuch 'some' became kuc, and samajh 'understand' became samaj.

When the British colonised the Indian subcontinent from the late 18th through to the late 19th century, they used the words 'Hindustani', 'Hindi', and 'Urdu' interchangeably. They developed it as the language of administration of British India, further preparing it to be the official language of modern India and Pakistan. However, with independence, use of the word 'Hindustani' declined, being largely replaced by 'Hindi' and 'Urdu', or 'Hindi–Urdu' when either of those was too specific. More recently, the word 'Hindustani' has been used for the colloquial language of Bollywood films, which are popular in both India and Pakistan and which cannot be unambiguously identified as either Hindi or Urdu.

British rule over India also introduced some English words into Hindustani, with these influences increasing with the later spread of English as a world language. This has created a new variant of Hindustani known as Hinglish or Urdish.

== Registers ==
At the spoken level, Hindi and Urdu are considered registers of a single language, Hindustani or Hindi–Urdu, as they share a common grammar and core vocabulary. They differ in literary and formal vocabulary: where literary Hindi draws heavily on Sanskrit and to a lesser extent Prakrit, literary Urdu draws heavily on Persian and Arabic loanwords. The grammar and base vocabulary (most pronouns, verbs, adpositions, etc.) of both Hindi and Urdu, however, are the same and derive from a Prakritic base, and both have Persian/Arabic influence.

A grammar of the Hindustani language, published 1843

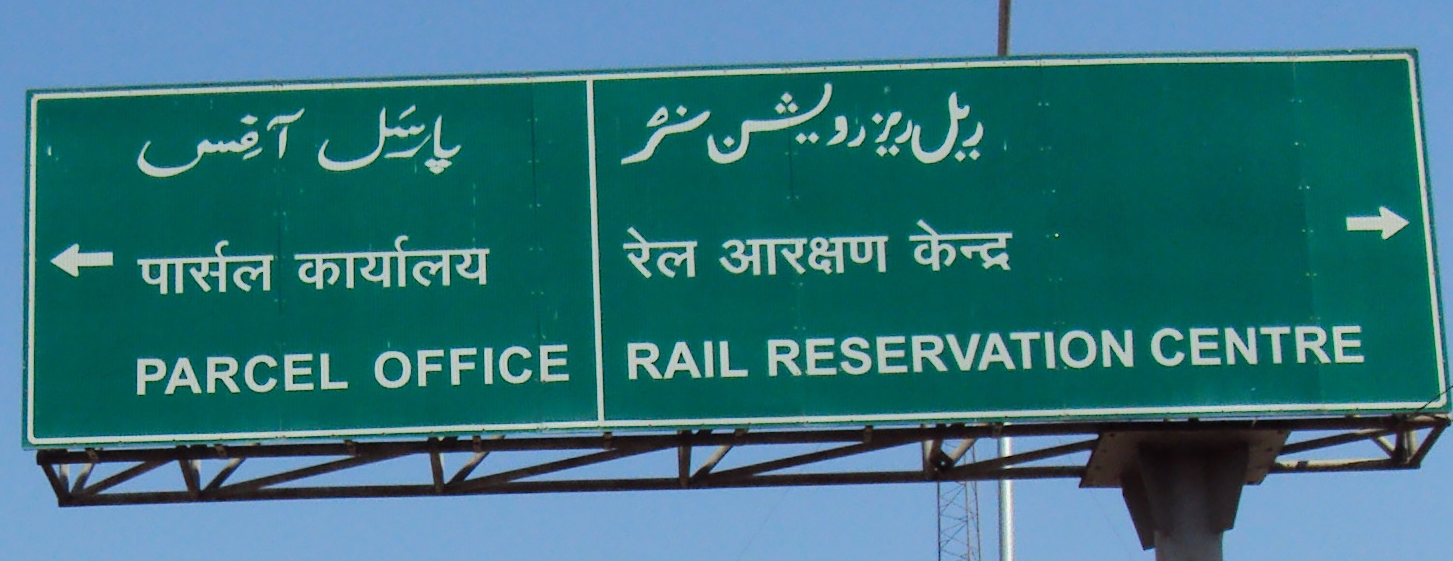
A road sign using Hindi, Urdu, and English

The standardised registers Hindi and Urdu are collectively known as Hindi–Urdu. Hindustani is the lingua franca of the north and west of the Indian subcontinent, though it is understood fairly well in other regions also, especially in the urban areas. This has led it to be characterised as a continuum that ranges between Hindi and Urdu. A common vernacular sharing characteristics with Sanskritised Hindi, regional Hindi and Urdu, Hindustani is more commonly used as a vernacular than highly Sanskritised Hindi or highly Persianised Urdu.

This can be seen in the popular culture of Bollywood or, more generally, the vernacular of North Indians and Pakistanis, which generally employs a lexicon common to both Hindi and Urdu speakers. Minor subtleties in region will also affect the 'brand' of Hindustani, sometimes pushing the Hindustani closer to Urdu or to Hindi. One might reasonably assume that the Hindustani spoken in Lucknow, Uttar Pradesh (known for its usage of Urdu) and Varanasi (a holy city for Hindus and thus using highly Sanskritised Hindi) is somewhat different.

In modern times, a third variety of Hindustani with significant English influences has also appeared, which is sometimes called Hinglish or Urdish.

=== Standard Hindi ===
Standard Hindi, one of the 22 officially recognised languages of India and the official language of the Union, is usually written in the indigenous Devanagari script of India and exhibits less Persian and Arabic influence than Urdu. It has a literature of 500 years, with prose, poetry, religion and philosophy. One could conceive of a wide spectrum of dialects and registers, with the highly Persianised Urdu at one end of the spectrum and a heavily Sanskritised variety spoken in the region around Varanasi, at the other end. In common usage in India, the term Hindi includes all these dialects except those at the Urdu spectrum. Thus, the different meanings of the word Hindi include, among others:

1. standardised Hindi as taught in schools throughout India (except some states such as Tamil Nadu),
2. formal or official Hindi advocated by Purushottam Das Tandon and as instituted by the post-independence Indian government, heavily influenced by Sanskrit,
3. the vernacular dialects of Hindustani as spoken throughout India,
4. the neutralised form of Hindustani used in popular television and films (which is nearly identical to colloquial Urdu), or
5. the more formal neutralised form of Hindustani used in television and print news reports.

=== Standard Urdu ===
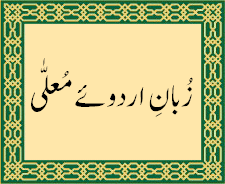
The phrase Zubān-e Urdu-ye Mualla in Nastaʿlīq

Urdu is the national language and state language of Pakistan and one of the 22 officially recognised languages of India. It is written, except in some parts of India, in the Nastaliq style of the Urdu alphabet, an extended Perso-Arabic script incorporating Indic phonemes. It is heavily influenced by Persian vocabulary and was historically also known as Rekhta.

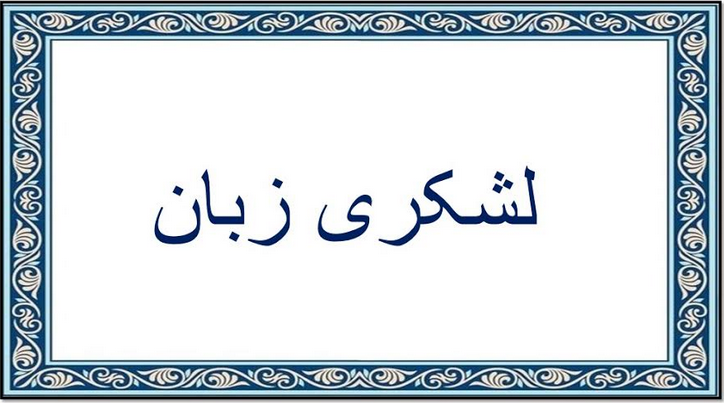
Lashkari Zabān title in the Perso-Arabic script

As Dakhini (or Deccani) where it also draws words from local languages, it survives and enjoys a rich history in the Deccan and other parts of South India, with the prestige dialect being Hyderabadi Urdu spoken in and around the capital of the Nizams and the Deccan Sultanates.

Earliest forms of the language's literature may be traced back to the 13th–14th century works of Amīr Khusrau Dehlavī, often called the "father of Urdu literature", while Walī Deccani is seen as the progenitor of Urdu poetry.

=== Bazaar Hindustani ===
The term bazaar Hindustani, in other words, the 'street talk' or literally 'marketplace Hindustani', also known as Colloquial Hindi (Note: Hindi: बोलचाल हिन्दी, Urdu: بول چال ہندی) or Simplified Urdu, (Note: Hindi: आसान उर्दू, Urdu: آسان اردو) has arisen to denote a colloquial register of the language that uses vocabulary common to both Hindi and Urdu while eschewing high-register and specialised Perso-Arabic or Sanskrit derived words. It has emerged in various South Asian cities where Hindustani is not the main language, in order to facilitate communication across language barriers. It is characterised by loanwords from local languages.

== Names ==
Amir Khusrau c. 1300 referred to this language of his writings as Dehlavi (देहलवी / دہلوی, 'of Delhi') or Hindavi (हिन्दवी / ہندوی). During this period, Hindustani was used by Sufis in promulgating their message across the Indian subcontinent. After the advent of the Mughals in the subcontinent, Hindustani acquired more Persian loanwords. Rekhta ('mixture'), Hindi ('Indian'), Hindustani, Hindvi, Lahori, and Dakhini (amongst others) became popular names for the same language until the 18th century. The name Urdu (from Zabān-i-Ordū-yi-Mu'allā, or Orda) appeared around 1780. It is believed to have been coined by the poet Mashafi. In local literature and speech, it was also known as the Lashkarī Zabān (military language) or Lashkarī. Mashafi was the first person to simply modify the name Zabān-i-Ordū-yi-Mu'allā to Urdu.

During the British Raj, the term Hindustani was used by British officials. In 1796, John Borthwick Gilchrist published "A Grammar of the Hindoostanee Language". Upon partition, India and Pakistan established national standards that they called Hindi and Urdu, respectively, and attempted to make distinct, with the result that Hindustani commonly, but mistakenly, came to be seen as a "mixture" of Hindi and Urdu.

Grierson, in his highly influential Linguistic Survey of India, proposed that the names Hindustani, Urdu, and Hindi be separated in use for different varieties of the Hindustani language, rather than as the overlapping synonyms they frequently were:

We may now define the three main varieties of Hindōstānī as follows:—Hindōstānī is primarily the language of the Upper Gangetic Doab, and is also the lingua franca of India, capable of being written in both Persian and Dēva-nāgarī characters, and without purism, avoiding alike the excessive use of either Persian or Sanskrit words when employed for literature. The name 'Urdū' can then be confined to that special variety of Hindōstānī in which Persian words are of frequent occurrence, and which hence can only be written in the Persian character, and, similarly, 'Hindī' can be confined to the form of Hindōstānī in which Sanskrit words abound, and which hence can only be written in the Dēva-nāgarī character.

== Official status ==
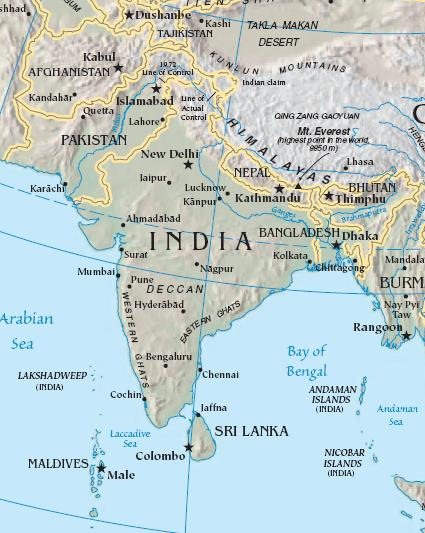
Hindustani, in its standardised registers, is one of the official languages of both India (Hindi) and Pakistan (Urdu).

Before 1947, Hindustani was officially recognised by the British Raj. In the post-independence period however, the term Hindustani has lost currency and is not given any official recognition by the Indian or Pakistani governments. The language is instead recognised by its standard forms, Hindi and Urdu.

=== Hindi ===
Hindi is declared by Article 343(1), Part 17 of the Indian Constitution as the "official language (राजभाषा, rājabhāṣā) of the Union." (In this context, "Union" means the Federal Government and not the entire country—India has 23 official languages.) At the same time, however, the definitive text of federal laws is officially the English text and proceedings in the higher appellate courts must be conducted in English.

At the state level, Hindi is one of the official languages in 10 of the 29 Indian states and three union territories, respectively: Bihar, Chandigarh, Chhattisgarh, Delhi, Haryana, Himachal Pradesh, Jharkhand, Madhya Pradesh, Rajasthan, Uttarakhand, Uttar Pradesh and West Bengal; Andaman and Nicobar Islands, Dadra and Nagar Haveli.

In the remaining states, Hindi is not an official language. In states like Tamil Nadu and Karnataka, studying Hindi is not compulsory in the state curriculum. However, an option to take the same as second or third language does exist. In many other states, studying Hindi is usually compulsory in the school curriculum as a third language (the first two languages being the state's official language and English), though the intensiveness of Hindi in the curriculum varies.

=== Urdu ===
Urdu is the national language (قومی زبان, qaumi zabān) of Pakistan, where it shares official language status with English. Although English is spoken by many, and Punjabi is the native language of the majority of the population, Urdu is the lingua franca. In India, Urdu is one of the languages recognised in the Eighth Schedule to the Constitution of India and is an official language of the Indian states of Jharkhand, Bihar, Telangana, Uttar Pradesh, West Bengal, and also the union territories of Delhi and Jammu and Kashmir. Although the government school system in most other states emphasises Modern Standard Hindi, at universities in cities such as Lucknow, Aligarh and Hyderabad, Urdu is spoken and learnt.

== Geographical distribution ==
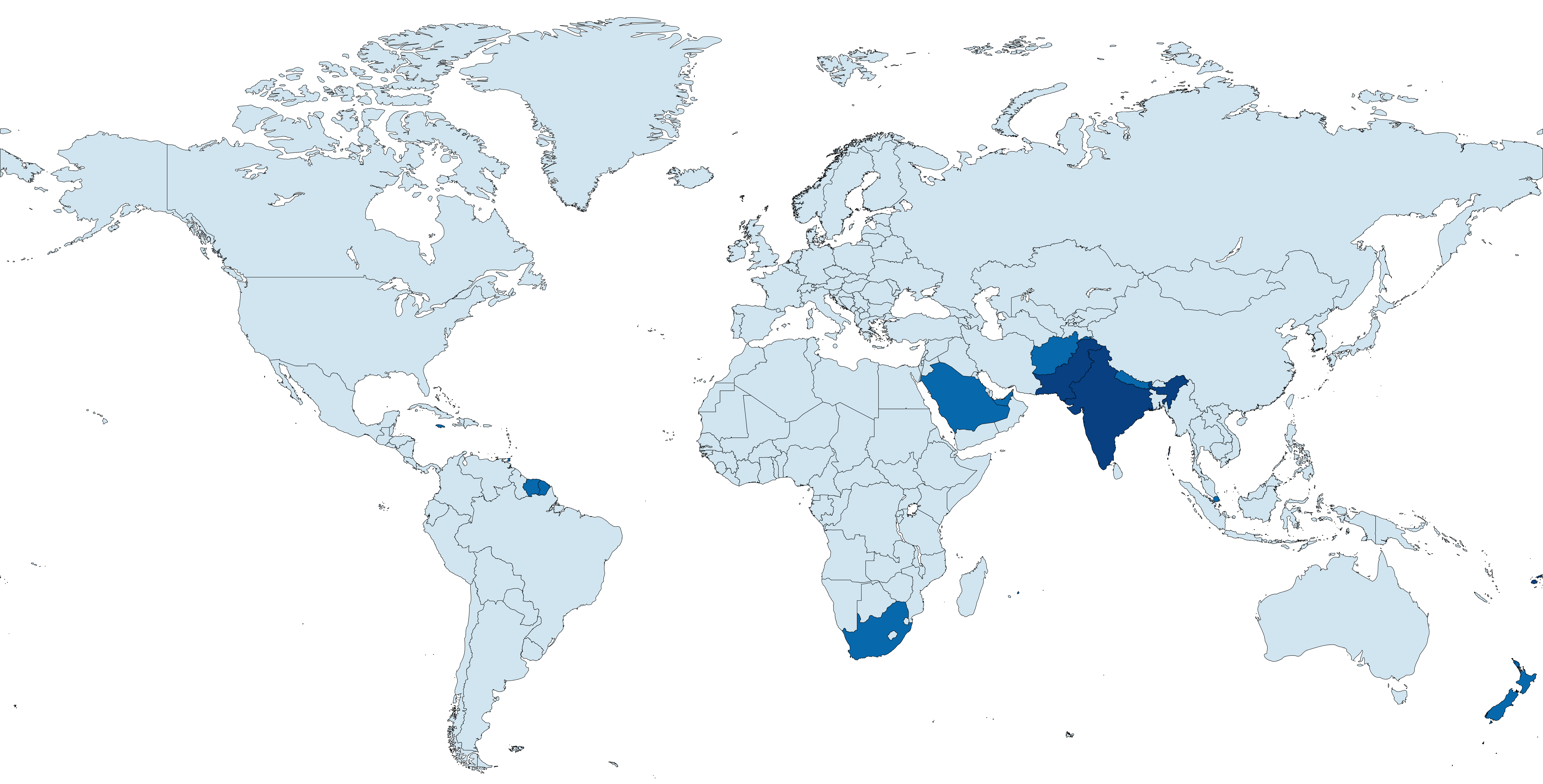
Spread of Hindustani across the world Majority/Official Significant Minority/Recognised Minority

Besides being the lingua franca of North India and Pakistan in South Asia, Hindustani is also spoken by many in the South Asian diaspora and their descendants around the world, including North America (e.g., in Canada, Hindustani is one of the fastest growing languages), Europe (in particular the United Kingdom), and the Middle East.

- A sizeable population in Afghanistan, especially in Kabul, can also speak and understand Hindi–Urdu due to the popularity and influence of Bollywood films and songs in the region, as well as the fact that many Afghan refugees spent time in Pakistan in the 1980s and 1990s.
- Fiji Hindi was derived from the Hindustani linguistic group and is spoken widely by Fijians of Indian origin.
- Hindustani was also one of the languages that was spoken widely during British rule in Burma. Many older citizens of Myanmar, particularly Anglo-Indians and the Anglo-Burmese, still know it, although it has had no official status in the country since military rule began.
- Hindustani is also spoken in the countries of the Gulf Cooperation Council, where migrant workers from various countries live and work for several years.

== Phonology ==
Hindustani phonology, shared by both Hindi and Urdu, is characterised by a symmetrical ten-vowel system, where vowels are distinguished by length, with long vowels typically being tense and short vowels lax. The language also includes nasalised vowels, as well as a wide array of consonants, including aspirated and murmured sounds. Hindustani maintains a four-way phonation distinction among plosives, unlike the two-way distinction in English.

== Vocabulary ==
Hindi–Urdu's core vocabulary has an Indic base, being derived from Prakrit and Classical Sanskrit, which in turn both derive from Vedic Sanskrit, as well as a substantial number of loanwords from Persian, Turkic (always through Persian) and Arabic (either directly or via Persian). Hindustani contains around 5,500 words of Persian, Turkic and Arabic origin. There are also quite many words borrowed from English, as well as some words from other European languages such as Portuguese, French and Dutch.

Hindustani also borrowed Persian (and more recently, Arabic) affixes to create new words. In particular, Persian affixes became so assimilated that they were used with original Khari Boli words as well.

== Writing system ==
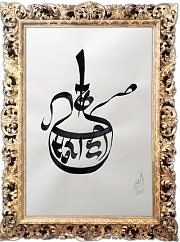
"Surahi" in Samrup Rachna calligraphy

Historically, Hindustani was written in the Devanagari, Perso-Arabic and sometimes in the Kaithi script. During the British Raj, Hindustani was officially generally written in a derivation of the Perso-Arabic script, now known as the Urdu alphabet (written in the Nastaʿlīq style). Kaithi and Devanagari are two of the Brahmic scripts which were employed alongside the Urdu alphabet.

This remained to be the case until the 20th century when Hindi in the Devanagari script was sanctioned as an official language in India. In India, the Hindi register is officially written in Devanagari, and Urdu in the Urdu alphabet, to the extent that these standards are partly defined by their script.

Today, it continues to be written in the Urdu alphabet in Pakistan. Popular publications in India, Urdu is also written in Devanagari, with slight variations in attempts to establish a Devanagari Urdu alphabet alongside the Devanagari Hindi alphabet.

Devanagari
अ	आ	इ	ई	उ	ऊ	ए	ऐ	ओ	औ
ə	aː	ɪ	iː	ʊ	uː	eː	ɛː	oː	ɔː
क	क़	ख	ख़	ग	ग़	घ	ङ		
k	q	kʰ	x	ɡ	ɣ	ɡʱ	ŋ		
च	छ	ज	ज़	झ	झ़	ञ			
t͡ʃ	t͡ʃʰ	d͡ʒ	z	d͡ʒʱ	ʒ	ɲ			
ट	ठ	ड	ड़	ढ	ढ़	ण			
ʈ	ʈʰ	ɖ	ɽ	ɖʱ	ɽʱ	ɳ			
त	थ	द	ध	न					
t	tʰ	d	dʱ	n					
प	फ	फ़	ब	भ	म				
p	pʰ	f	b	bʱ	m				
य	र	ल	व	श	ष	स	ह		
j	ɾ	l	ʋ, w	ʃ	ʂ	s	ɦ		

Urdu alphabet
Letter	Name of letter	Transliteration	IPA
ا	alif	a, ā, i, or u	/ə/, /aː/, /ɪ/, or /ʊ/
ب	be	b	/b/
پ	pe	p	/p/
ت	te	t	/t/
ٹ	ṭe	ṭ	/ʈ/
ث	se	s	/s/
ج	jīm	j	/d͡ʒ/
چ	che	c	/t͡ʃ/
ح	baṛī he	h̤	/h ~ ɦ/
خ	khe	k͟h	/x/
د	dāl	d	/d/
ڈ	ḍāl	ḍ	/ɖ/
ذ	zāl	z	/z/
ر	re	r	/r ~ ɾ/
ڑ	ṛe	ṛ	/ɽ/
ز	ze	z	/z/
ژ	zhe	ž	/ʒ/
س	sīn	s	/s/
ش	shīn	sh	/ʃ/
ص	su'ād	s̤	/s/
ض	zu'ād	ż	/z/
ط	to'e	t̤	/t/
ظ	zo'e	ẓ	/z/
ع	‘ain	‘	–
غ	ghain	ġ	/ɣ/
ف	fe	f	/f/
ق	qāf	q	/q/
ک	kāf	k	/k/
گ	gāf	g	/ɡ/
ل	lām	l	/l/
م	mīm	m	/m/
ن	nūn	n	/n/
ں	nūn ghunna	ṁ or m̐	/◌̃/
و	wā'o	w, v, ō, au, or ū	/w/, /ʋ/, /oː/, /ɔ/ or /uː/
ہ	choṭī he	h	/h ~ ɦ/
ھ	do chashmī he	h	/ʰ/ or /ʱ/
ء	hamza	'	/ʔ/
ی	ye	y or ī	/j/ or /iː/
ے	baṛī ye	ai or ē	/ɛː/, or /eː/

Because of anglicisation in South Asia and the international use of the Latin script, Hindustani is occasionally written in the Latin script. This adaptation is called Roman Urdu or Romanised Hindi, depending upon the register used. Since Urdu and Hindi are mutually intelligible when spoken, Romanised Hindi and Roman Urdu (unlike Devanagari Hindi and Urdu in the Urdu alphabet) are mostly mutually intelligible as well.

== Sample text ==
=== Colloquial Hindustani ===
An example of colloquial Hindustani:

- Devanagari: ये कितने का है?
- Urdu: یہ کتنے کا ہے؟
- Romanisation: Ye kitnē kā hai?
- English: How much is this?

The following is a sample text, Article 1 of the Universal Declaration of Human Rights, in the two official registers of Hindustani, Hindi and Urdu. Because this is a formal legal text, differences in vocabulary are most pronounced.

=== Literary Hindi ===
अनुच्छेद १ — सभी मनुष्यों को गौरव और अधिकारों के विषय में जन्मजात स्वतन्त्रता और समानता प्राप्त हैं। उन्हें बुद्धि और अन्तरात्मा की देन प्राप्त है और परस्पर उन्हें भाईचारे के भाव से बर्ताव करना चाहिए।

Urdu transliteration
انُچھید ١ : سبھی منُشیوں کو گورو اور ادھکاروں کے وِشئے میں جنمجات سوَتنتْرتا پراپت ہیں۔ اُنہیں بدھی اور انتراتما کی دین پراپت ہے اور پرسپر اُنہیں بھائی چارے کے بھاؤ سے برتاؤ کرنا چاہئے۔
Transliteration (ISO 15919)
Anucchēd 1: Sabhī manuṣyō̃ kō gaurav aur adhikārō̃ kē viṣay mē̃ janmajāt svatantratā aur samāntā prāpt haĩ. Unhē̃ buddhi aur antarātmā kī dēn prāpt hai aur paraspar unhē̃ bhāīcārē kē bhāv sē bartāv karnā cāhiē.
Transcription (IPA)
səbʰiː mənʊʂjõː koː ɡɔːɾəʋ ɔːɾ ədʰɪkɑːɾõː keː ʋɪʂəj mẽː dʒənmədʒɑːt sʋətəntɾətɑː ɔːɾ səmɑːntɑː pɾɑːpt ɦɛ̃ː ‖ ʊnʰẽː bʊdːʰɪ ɔːɾ əntəɾɑːtmɑː kiː deːn pɾɑːpt ɦɛː ɔːɾ pəɾəspəɾ ʊnʰẽː bʰɑːiːtʃɑːɾeː keː bʰɑːʋ seː bəɾtɑːʋ kəɾnɑː tʃɑːɦɪeː ‖]
Gloss (word-to-word)
Article 1—All human-beings to dignity and rights' matter in from-birth freedom acquired is. Them to reason and conscience's endowment acquired is and always them to brotherhood's spirit with behaviour to do should.
Translation (grammatical)
Article 1—All human beings are born free and equal in dignity and rights. They are endowed with reason and conscience and should act towards one another in a spirit of brotherhood.

=== Literary Urdu ===
:دفعہ ١: تمام اِنسان آزاد اور حُقوق و عِزت کے اعتبار سے برابر پَیدا ہُوئے ہَیں۔ انہیں ضمِیر اور عقل ودِیعت ہوئی ہَیں۔ اِس لئے انہیں ایک دُوسرے کے ساتھ بھائی چارے کا سُلُوک کرنا چاہئے۔

Devanagari transliteration
दफ़ा १ — तमाम इनसान आज़ाद और हुक़ूक़ ओ इज़्ज़त के ऐतबार से बराबर पैदा हुए हैं। उन्हें ज़मीर और अक़्ल वदीयत हुई हैं। इसलिए उन्हें एक दूसरे के साथ भाई चारे का सुलूक करना चाहीए।
Transliteration (ISO 15919)
Dafʻah 1: Tamām insān āzād aur ḥuqūq ō ʻizzat kē iʻtibār sē barābar paidā hu’ē haĩ. Unhē̃ żamīr aur ʻaql wadīʻat hu’ī haĩ. Isli’ē unhē̃ ēk dūsrē kē sāth bhā’ī cārē kā sulūk karnā cāhi’ē.
Transcription (IPA)
dəfaː eːk təmaːm ɪnsaːn aːzaːd ɔːɾ hʊquːq oː izːət keː ɛːtəbaːɾ seː bəɾaːbəɾ pɛːdaː hʊeː hɛ̃ː ʊnʱẽː zəmiːɾ ɔːɾ əql ʋədiːət hʊiː hɛ̃ː ɪs lɪeː ʊnʱẽː eːk duːsɾeː keː saːtʰ bʱaːiː tʃaːɾeː kaː sʊluːk kəɾnaː tʃaːhɪeː
Gloss (word-to-word)
Article 1: All humans free[,] and rights and dignity's consideration from equal born are. To them conscience and intellect endowed is. Therefore, they one another's with brotherhood's treatment do must.
Translation (grammatical)
Article 1—All human beings are born free and equal in dignity and rights. They are endowed with reason and conscience. Therefore, they should act towards one another in a spirit of brotherhood.

== Hindustani and Bollywood ==
The predominant Indian film industry Bollywood, located in Mumbai, Maharashtra, uses Standard Hindi, colloquial Hindustani, Bombay Hindi, Urdu, Awadhi, Rajasthani, Bhojpuri, and Braj Bhasha, along with Punjabi and with the liberal use of English or Hinglish in scripts and soundtrack lyrics.

Film titles are often screened in three scripts: Latin, Devanagari and occasionally Perso-Arabic. The use of Urdu or Hindi in films depends on the film's context: historical films set in the Delhi Sultanate or Mughal Empire are almost entirely in Urdu, whereas films based on Hindu mythology or ancient India make heavy use of Hindi with Sanskrit vocabulary.

In recent years, boycotts have been launched against Bollywood films by Hindu nationalists partially on the basis that the films feature too much Urdu, with some critics employing the epithet "Urduwood".

== See also ==
- Caribbean Hindustani
- Hindustani profanity
- Hindustan
- Languages of India
- Languages of Pakistan
- List of Hindi authors
- List of Urdu authors
- Hindi–Urdu transliteration
- Uddin and Begum Hindustani Romanisation

== Bibliography ==
- Asher, R. E. 1994. "Hindi." Pp. 1547–49 in The Encyclopedia of language and linguistics, edited by R. E. Asher. Oxford: Pergamon Press. ISBN 0-08-035943-4.
- Bailey, Thomas G. 1950. Teach yourself Hindustani. London: English Universities Press.
- Chatterji, Suniti K. 1960. Indo-Aryan and Hindi (rev. 2nd ed.). Calcutta: Firma K. L. Mukhopadhyay.
- Dua, Hans R. 1992. "Hindi-Urdu as a pluricentric language." In Pluricentric languages: Differing norms in different nations, edited by M. G. Clyne. Berlin: Mouton de Gruyter. ISBN 3-11-012855-1.
- Dua, Hans R. 1994a. "Hindustani." Pp. 1554 in The Encyclopedia of language and linguistics, edited by R. E. Asher. Oxford: Pergamon Press.
- Mustafa, K.S (2008), "Dakkhni", in Prakāśaṃ, Vennelakaṇṭi (ed.), Encyclopaedia of the Linguistic Sciences: Issues and Theories, Allied Publishers, pp. 185–186, ISBN 978-1139465502
- —— 1994b. "Urdu." Pp. 4863–64 in The Encyclopedia of language and linguistics, edited by R. E. Asher. Oxford: Pergamon Press.
- Rai, Amrit. 1984. A house divided: The origin and development of Hindi-Hindustani. Delhi: Oxford University Press. ISBN 0-19-561643-X
