= Ganga-Jamuni tehzeeb =

Syncretic fusion of Hindu-Muslim cultures in northern India

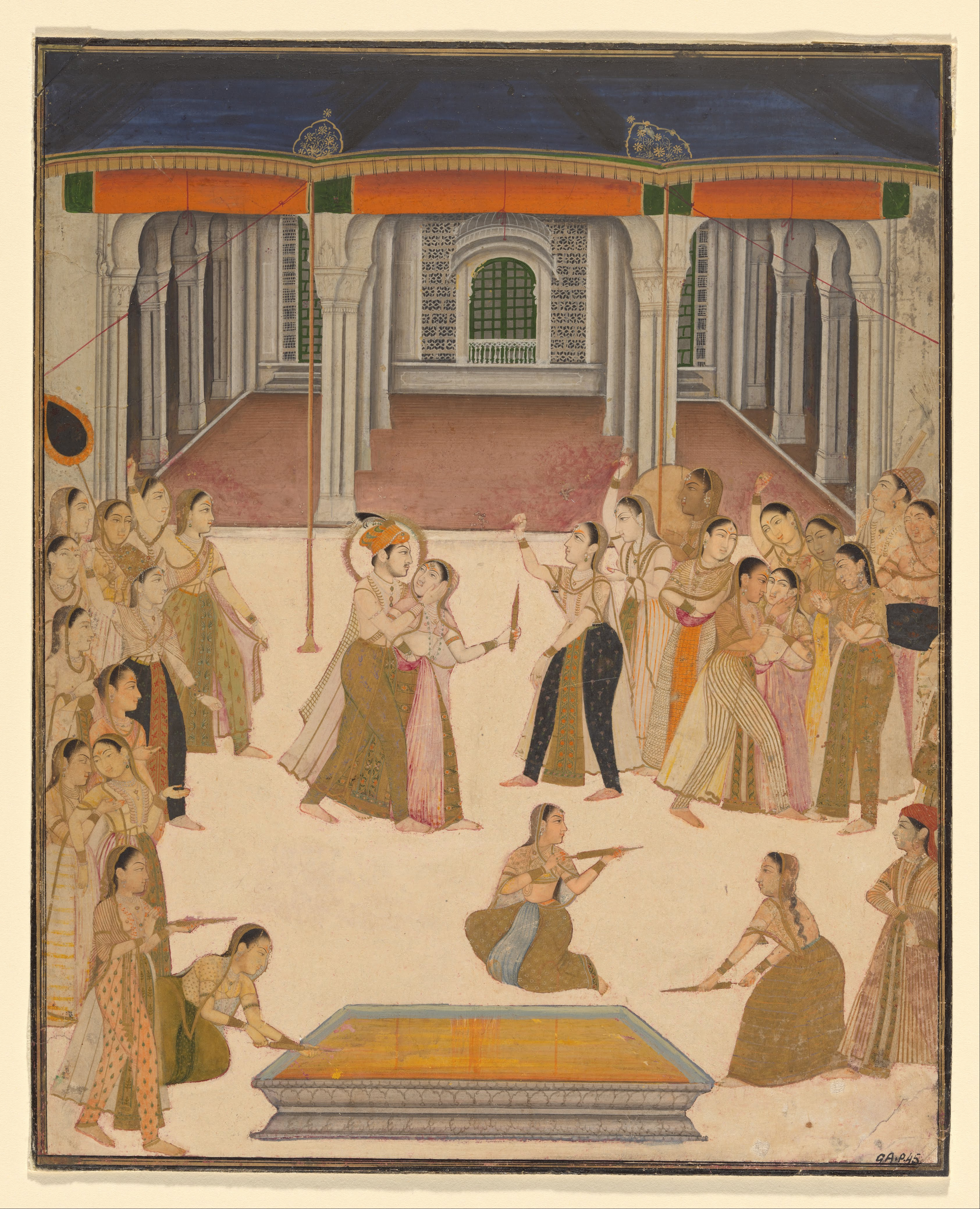
The Mughal emperor Jahangir celebrates Holi with ladies of the zenana.

Ganga–Jamuni Tehzeeb (Hindustani for Ganges–Yamuna Culture), also spelled as Ganga-Jamni Tehzeeb or just Hindustani Tehzeeb, is the composite high culture of the central plains of northern India, especially the doab region of Ganges and Yamuna rivers, that is a syncretic fusion of Hindu cultural elements with Muslim cultural elements. The composite Ganga-Jamuni culture emerged due to the interaction between Hindus and Muslims in the history of South Asia.

The tehzeeb (culture) includes a particular style of speech, literature, recreation, costume, manners, worldview, art, fashion, architecture and cuisine which more or less pervades the Hindustan region of the plains, Northern South Asia as a whole and the old city of Hyderabad in South India. Ganga Jamuni culture manifests itself as adherents of different religions in India celebrating each other's festivals, as well as communal harmony in India.

Ganga-Jamuni tehzeeb, is a poetic Awadhi phrase for the distinctive and syncretic Hindu-Muslim culture, is reflected in the fused spiritual connotations, forms, symbols, aesthetics, crafts and weaves, for example, Kashmiri Muslim carpet makers feature Durga in their patterns, Muslim sculptors making idols of Durga, and Hindu craftsmen create the Muharram tazia.

== Etymology ==
Ganga-Jamuni is a combination of two Hindi words that means, literally, "mixed", "composite", or "alloy". The term additionally references the Ganga and Jamuna rivers, that merge to form one entity, just as two cultures come "together to form a seamless single culture that draws richly from both traditional Hindu and Islamic influences", creating "a vibrant, multidimensional, peerless and syncretic culture."

Tehzeeb is an Urdu term meaning civilisation, culture, politeness, or progress/development.

== Festivals ==
Nawabs of Awadh were fore-runners of this culture. The region of Awadh in the state of Uttar Pradesh is usually considered to be the center of this culture. Allahabad, Lucknow, Kanpur, Faizabad-Ayodhya, and Varanasi (Benares) are a few of the many centers of this culture. In Lucknow, one prominent example of this culture is that not only Shias but also Sunni Muslims and Hindus participate, both historically and today, in the mourning and religious customs during the Islamic month of Muharram. The Hindu festival of Basant and Persian tradition of Nowruz were also patronised by the Shia rulers of Awadh.

Hyderabad, the capital city of Telangana in south-central part of the India, is also a big example of communal harmony where the local Telugu Hindus and Hyderabadi Muslims live with peace and brotherhood, where Hindu temples serve the dry dates fruits to mosques for Iftar Muslim festival.

== Language and literature ==
With the Turko-Afghan conquests over the Indo-Gangetic plains in medieval India, Delhi and its surrounding plains along the river Yamuna became the political and cultural capital of these Persianate dynasties. Delhi came to prominence because of its strategic location, the west of which was the fertile but open Indus plains and east of which began the populous Gangetic plains. The local language of Delhi arose into Hindavi or Hindustani, the eventual sociolect of the descendants of the conquerors, the nobility, the courtiers, and hence the cultured. The official language of these empires was Classical Persian and the usual mother tongue of these upper echelons was an Indian language albeit with heavy Persian influence, hence Hindavi or Hindi was the word used which still implies Indian in Persian. As the empire enlarged, persianised Old Hindi, popularly known as Hindavi and Hindustani, became the basis for the lingua franca different Indo-Aryan speakers on the plains and beyond used to communicate. Among the many Hindustani varieties that arose, Deccani being the major one, a form of Old Hindi that migrated from the banks of Delhi and mixed with Marathi, Telugu and Kannada in the Deccan.

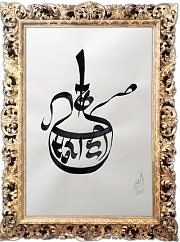
The word Surahi ("pitcher") is written in two different scripts, Devanagri and Nastaliq, used for Hindi-Urdu in unison.

The literary tradition in Hindustani really began in the Mughal North with the appreciation of poetry in Deccani Hindi, a medium of literary exchange in the Pre-Mughal Deccan South. Until then Hindavi was not a court language of the Mughals as was previously during the Delhi sultanate. This event laid the foundation towards the first standardisation of the Hindi language, this polished courtly speech begun to be specifically called "Urdu" which is today the national language of Pakistan and an official language in India. The second standardisation of the Hindi language took place during the British Raj, which is now one of the two official languages of GoI, along with English. This second standardisation, though in the Sanskritized register has retained the inevitable name Hindi instead and hence Hindi refers both to the official sanskritised standard as well as the colloquial Hindi and the many related dialects of the Hindi languages.

The first Deccani author was Khwaja Bandanawaz Gesudaraz Muhammad Hasan. Bahamani Sultanate were the pioneers, writers such as Bande Nawaz, Shah Miranji and Shah Buran. Sultan Muhammad Quli Qutub Shah of Golconda, Sultan Ibrahim Adil Shah II of Bijapur, and Wali Mohammad Wali were important writers in Deccani. Influenced by this, Urdu Prose and Poetry, as is now called also began in the Hindustan region, chief writers being, Ghalib, Khaliq, Zamir, Aatish, Nasikh, Zauq, Momin and Shefta. Malik Muhammad Jayasi's Padmavat in Awadhi and the Works of Kabir Das. An age of tremendous integration between the Hindu and the Islamic elements in the Arts with the advent of many Muslim Bhakti poets like Abdul Rahim Khan-I-Khana who was a minister to Mughal emperor Akbar and was also a great devotee of Krishna. The Nirgun School of Bhakti Poetry was also tremendously secular in nature and its propounders like Kabir and Guru Nanak had a large number of followers irrespective of caste or religion.

One of the best examples of syncretic faith is captured in one of Kabir's doha (verse), "some chant Allah, some chant Ram, Kabir is a worshiper of true love and hence reveres both."

Devanagari
कोई जपे रहीम रहीम

कोई जपे है राम

दास कबीर है प्रेम पुजारी

दोनों को परनाम

Nastaliq

کوئی جپے رحیم رحیم
کوئی جپے ہے رام
داس کبیر ہے پریم پجاری
دونوں کو پرنام

Roman
Koi jape rahim rahim

Koi jape hai ram

Das Kabir hai prem pujari

Dono ko parnaam

Translation
Some chant O Merciful [Allah]

Some chant Ram

Kabir is a worshiper of true love

And reveres them both

== Etiquette and costume ==
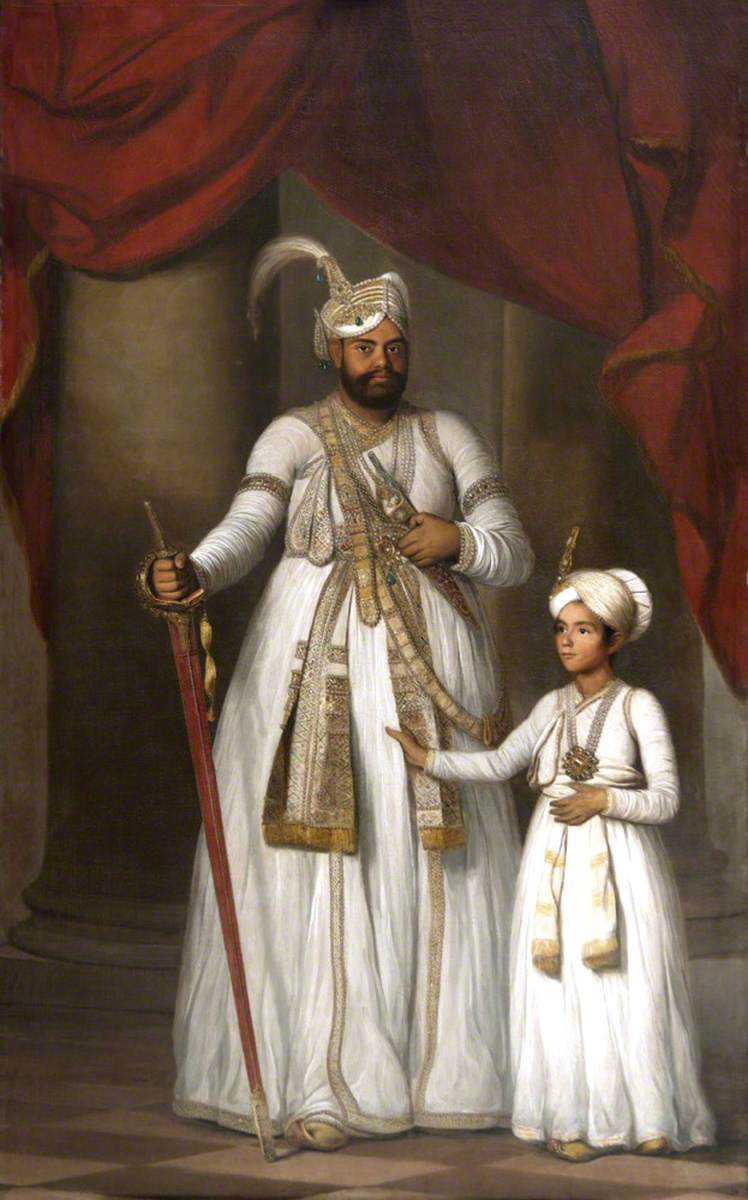
Jama worn by the Nawab of Carnatic and his son.

Awadh has a special place in the etiquette of this culture along with Delhi and Hyderabad; in fact Lucknowi Urdu still retains the polished and polite language of Ganga-Jamuni Tehzeeb. Delhi Sultanate, Bahamani Sultanate, Deccan Sultanates, Mughal Empire, Nawabs of Awadh, Bhopal, Carnatic and the Nizams of Hyderabad were forerunners of this tehzeeb. The greeting Aadaab from the Arabic word آداب, meaning respect and politeness, is a hand gesture and expression used in the Indian subcontinent for greeting, especially between Muslims and non-Muslims. It is associated with the Ganga-Jamuni culture because it originated out of a necessity for a more non-religious greeting from the Arabic Assalamu Alaikum and Sanskrit Namaste.

Sherwani, Jama, Topi, Kurta, Dupatta, Salwar, Kameez, Shawl, Pajama and Socks are few of the major attire still present in India.

== Recreation and cuisine ==
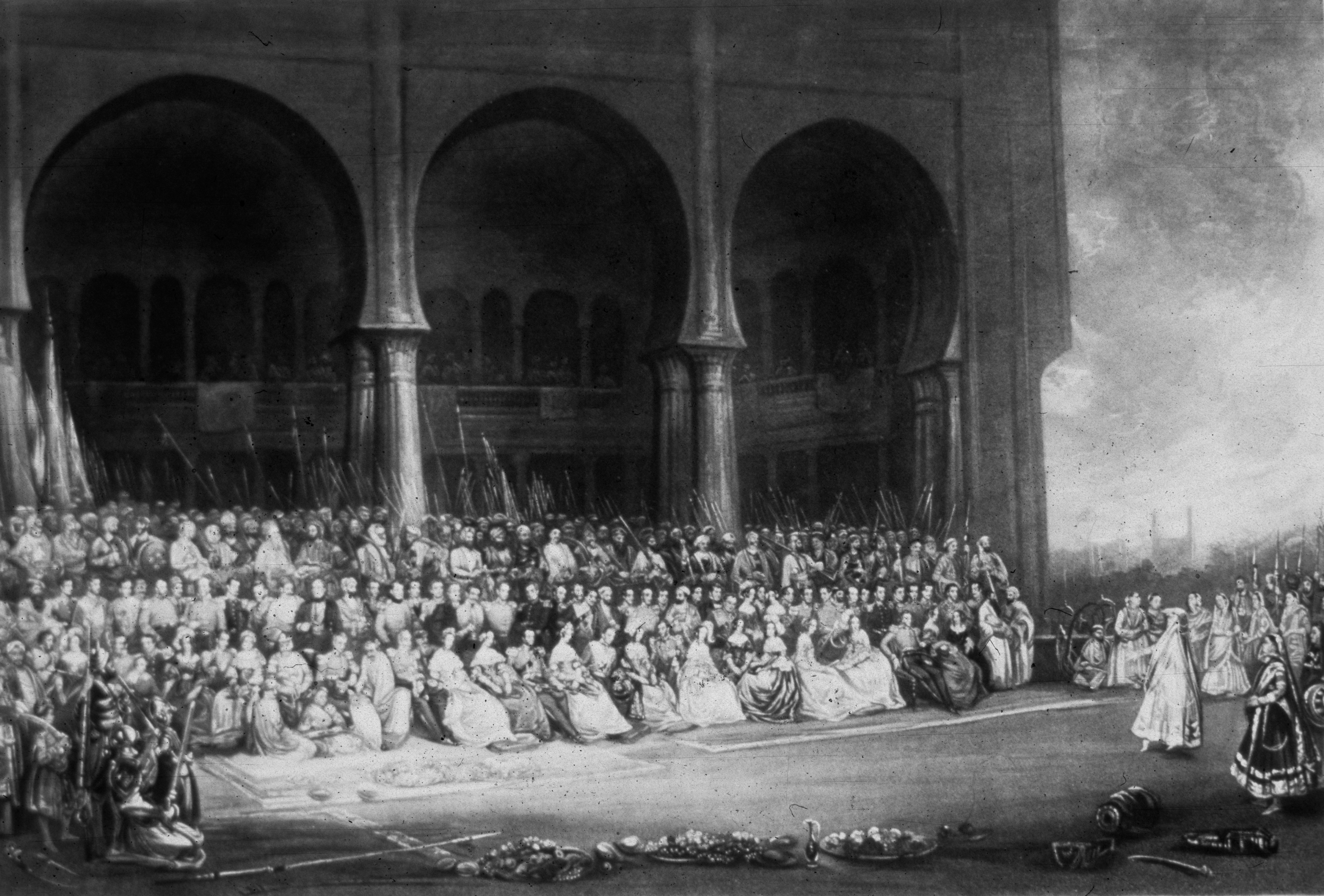
Mehfil-e-Mushaira at Hyderabad, 1820.

== See also ==
- Cultural appropriation
- Cultural assimilation
- Hindu–Islamic relations
- Hindu-Muslim unity
- Opposition to the partition of India
- Phool Walon Ki Sair
- Din-i Ilahi
- Inclusivism, concept that all religions are at least partially true and none is untrue
- Sheilaism, a term for an individual selecting strands of multiple religions
- Folk religion, any flexible vernacular religion without a rigid doctrine
- Interfaith dialogue, constructive interaction among various religions
- Religious pluralism, tolerance for diversity of religions in a society
- Religious tolerance, respecting and upholding others' right to behold religion
- Multiple religious belonging, a phenomenon that a person can belong to multiple religion is specially found among more tolerant societies such as Indian and Chinese origin religions
- La Convivencia, a similar dynamic in medieval Islamic Spain
