= Urdish =

Hybrid use of Urdu and English

Urdish, Urglish or Urdunglish, a portmanteau of the words Urdu and English, is the macaronic hybrid use of English and Standard Urdu. In the context of spoken language, it involves code-switching between these languages whereby they are freely interchanged within a sentence or between sentences. In Pakistan and India, many bilingual or multi-lingual Urdu speakers, being familiar with both Urdu and English, display translanguaging in certain localities and between certain social groups.

In the context of written language, Urdish colloquially refers to Roman Urdu — Urdu written in English alphabet (that is, using Roman script instead of the traditional Perso-Arabic script), often also mixed with English words or phrases.

The term Urdish is first recorded in 1989. Other less common colloquial portmanteau words for Urdish include (chronologically): Urglish (recorded from 1995), Urdlish (1997) and Urduish (1998).

On 14 August 2015, the Government of Pakistan launched the Ilm Pakistan movement, with a uniform curriculum in Urdish. Ahsan Iqbal, Federal Minister of Pakistan, said, "Now the government is working on a new curriculum to provide a new medium to the students which will be the combination of both Urdu and English and will name it Urdish."

== Example ==
Comparison of different registers using the same sentence
Language	Sentence (in Latin script)	Remarks
English	The clouds of our country shower blessings on this land.	
Urdish	Hamārē country kē clouds is land par blessings shower kartē ha͠i.	Heavy code-mixing with English words and phrases.
Standard Urdu	Hamārē mulk ke abr is zamīn par raḥmat nāzil kartē ha͠i. (Nastaliq: ہمارے ملک کے ابر اس زمین پر رحمت نازل کرتے ہیں۔)	Highly Persianised and Arabised variety of the Hindustani language, mostly preferred for formal purposes by followers of Islam and people in a Persianate culture and setting.
