= Kauravi dialect =

Dialect of Hindustani language

Kauravi
- Khaṛībōlī
- Pronunciation: [kʰə.ɽiː boː.liː]
- Native to: Uttar Pradesh; Uttarakhand; Delhi; Haryana
- Region: Rohilkhand; Upper Doab; Eastern NCR
- Native speakers: 15,000,000 (2011 census); Census results conflate some speakers with Hindi.
- Language family: Indo-European: Indo-Iranian; Indo-Aryan; Central Zone; Western Hindi; Hindustani (?); Kauravi

Language codes
- ISO 639-3: –
- Glottolog: None
- Linguasphere: 59-AAF-qd
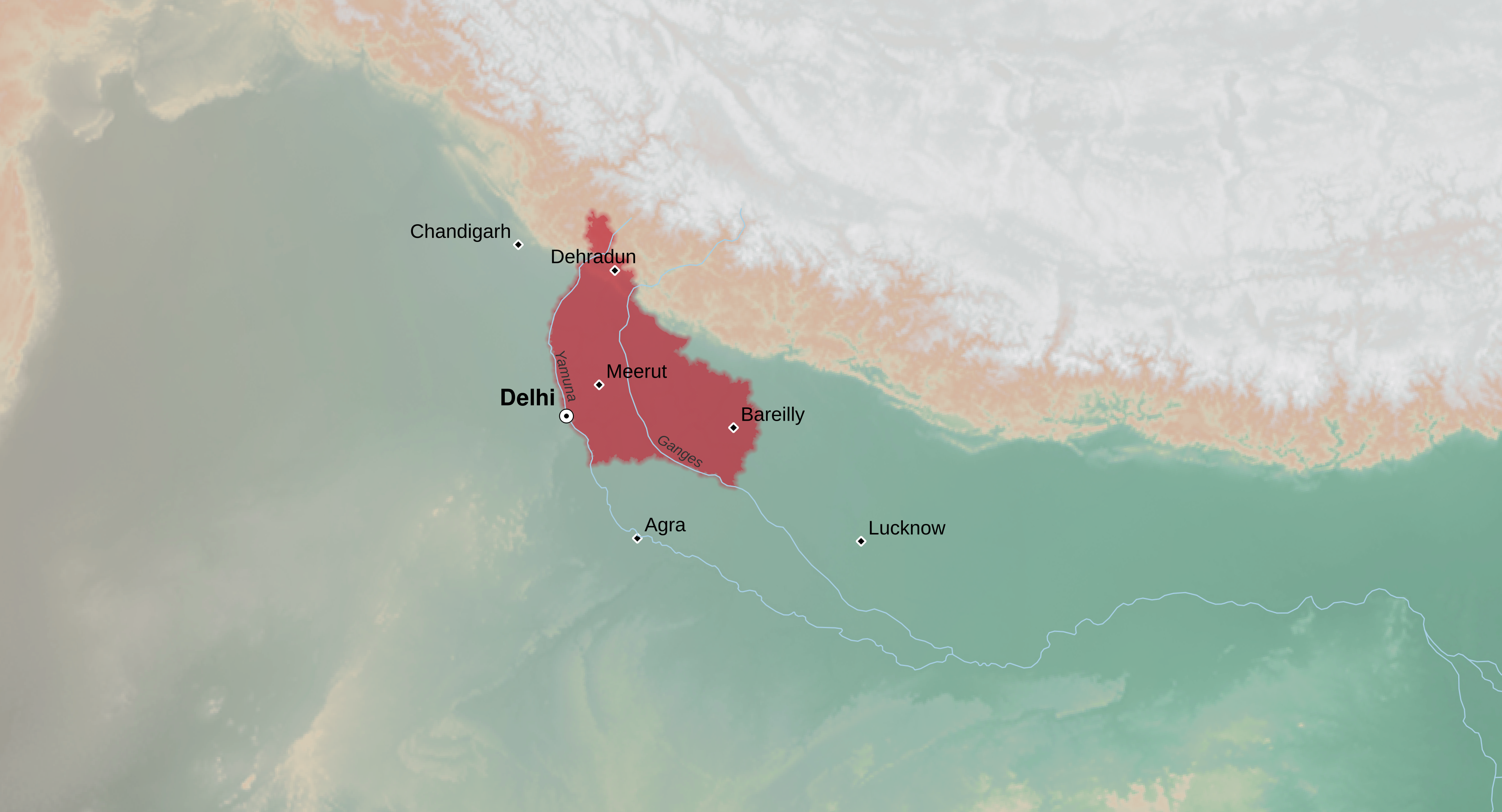
- Khariboli dialect area in India

Kauravī or Kauravi (Hindi: कौरवी, Urdu: کَوروی, Hindustani pronunciation: [kɔːɾ.ʋiː]), colloquially known as Khaṛībōlī or Khadiboli (Hindustani pronunciation: [kʰə.ɽiː boː.liː]), is a dialect and ancestral base for the Hindustani language descended from Shauraseni Prakrit that is mainly spoken by local people in Western Uttar Pradesh, across Yamuna river (Jamnapaar) in Delhi and Haryana, at the bordering areas with Uttar Pradesh and in Uttarakhand plains.

Modern Hindi and Urdu are two standard registers of Hindustani, descending from Old Hindi, originally called Hindavi and Dehlavi which gained prestige when it was accepted along with Persian as a language of the courts. Before that, it was only a language the Persianate states (like Delhi Sultanate) spoke to their subjects in, and later as a sociolect of the same ruling classes.

Modern Khariboli contains some features, such as gemination and pitch accent, which give it a distinctive sound and differentiates it from Braj and Awadhi. Old Hindi evolved to become the colloquial lingua franca Hindustani from which are Hindi and Urdu the respective standard registers.

== Khariboli in Hindustani popular culture ==
Khariboli is often seen as rustic by speakers of Standard Hindustani, and elements of it were used in Hum Log, India's first television soap opera, where the main family was depicted as having roots in the Western Uttar Pradesh.

As the two main languages of Western Uttar Pradesh and the areas surrounding Delhi, Khariboli and Braj Bhasha are often compared. One hypothesis of how Khariboli came to be described as khari (standing) polemically asserts that it refers to the "stiff and rustic uncouthness" of the dialect compared to the "mellifluousness and soft fluency" of Braj Bhasha. On the other hand, Khariboli supporters sometimes pejoratively referred to Braj Bhasha and other languages as Pariboli (Hindi: पड़ी बोली, Urdu: پڑی بولی, lit. 'fallen/supine dialects').

== Kauravi and Sankrityayan's proposal ==
Although most linguists acknowledge that Modern Standard Hindustani descended from Khariboli, the precise mechanism of dialectical changes from Khari to the prestige dialect (such as the loss of gemination which is so prevalent in Khari) lacks consensus. There are also variations within Khari itself across the area in which it is spoken. In the mid-twentieth century, Indian scholar and nationalist, Rahul Sankrityayan, proposed a redrawing of the linguistic map of the Hindustani zone. Drawing a distinction between the Khari of Old Delhi and the Khari of the extreme western parts of Western Uttar Pradesh, he advocated that the former retain the name Khariboli while the latter be renamed to Kauravi, after the Kuru kingdom of ancient India. Although the term Khariboli continues to be applied as it traditionally was, some linguists have accepted the term Kauravi as well, applying to the language spoken in the linguistic arc running from Saharanpur to Agra (i.e. the close east and northeast of Old Delhi). Sankrityayan postulated that this Kauravi dialect was the parent of Old Delhi's specific Khari dialect. Sankrityayan had also advocated that all Hindustani be standardized on the Devanagari script and Perso-Arabic be entirely abandoned.

== Relation to dialects of Hindustani ==
Khariboli is the modern, direct descendant of Old Khariboli, the ancestor of four registers of Hindustani, the lingua franca of northern India and Pakistan: Standard Hindi, Standard Urdu, Dakhini and Rekhta. Hindustani generally is distinguished by having heavy Perso-Arabic influence. Standard Hindi (also High Hindi, Manak Hindi) is the language of the government and is one of the official languages of India, Standard Urdu is the state language and national language of Pakistan, Dakhini is the historical literary dialect of the Deccan region, and Rekhta the "mixed" Hindustani of medieval poetry. These registers, together with Sansiboli, form the Hindustani dialect group.

== Early influences ==
The area around Delhi has long been the center of power in northern India, and naturally, the Khari Boli language came to be regarded as urbane and of a higher standard than the other surrounding languages. This view gradually gained ground over the 19th century; before that period, other languages such as Awadhi, Braj Bhasha, and Sadhukaddi were preferred by littérateurs. Standard Hindustani first developed with the migration of Persian Khari Boli speakers from Delhi to the Awadh region—most notably Amir Khusro, mixing the 'roughness' of Khari Boli with the relative 'softness' of Awadhi to form a new language which became called "Hindavi." This also became referred to as Hindustani, which was adopted as Hindi and Urdu by India and Pakistan after partition.

Although as a dialect, Khari Boli belongs to the Upper Doab, "Hindavi" developed in the cultural spheres of Allahabad and Varanasi.

=== Rise as the basis for Standard Hindustani ===
The earliest examples of Khariboli can be seen in the compositions of Amir Khusro (1253–1325).

Before the rise of Khariboli, the languages adopted by the Bhakti saints: Braj Bhasha (Krishna devotees), Awadhi (adopted by the Rama devotees) and Maithili (Vaishnavites of Bihar). However, after the Bhakti movement became ritualistic, these languages came to be regarded as rural and unrefined. Khariboli, on the other hand, was spoken in the urban area surrounding the Mughal courts, where Persian was the official language. The Persian-influenced Khariboli thus gradually came to be regarded as a prestige dialect, although hardly any literary works had been written in Khariboli before the British period in India.

The European administrators in India and the Christian missionaries played an important role in the creation and promotion of the Khariboli-based modern Hindustani. In 1800, the British East India Company established a college of higher education at Calcutta named the Fort William College. John Borthwick Gilchrist, a president of that college, encouraged his professors to write in their native tongue; some of the works thus produced were in the literary form of the Khariboli dialect. These books included Premsagar by Lallu Lal, Nasiketopakhyan by Sadal Mishra; Sukhsagar by Sadasukh Lal of Delhi and Rani Ketaki Ki Kahani by Inshallah Khan. More developed forms of Khariboli can also be seen in some mediocre literature produced in the early 18th century. Examples are Chand Chhand Varnan Ki Mahima by Ganga Bhatt, Yogavashishtha by Ram Prasad Niranjani, Gora Badal Ki Katha by Jatmal, Mandovar Ka Varnan by Anonymous, a translation of Ravishenacharya's Jain Padmapuran by Daulat Ram (dated 1761). With government patronage and literary popularity, the Khariboli flourished, even as the use of previously more literary tongues such as Awadhi, Braj, and Maithili declined in the literary vehicles. The literary works in Khariboli gained momentum from the second half of the 19th century onwards. A prominent Indian historian Raja Sivaprasad was a promoter of the Hindi language, in particular the Khariboli version. Gradually, in the subsequent years, Khariboli became the basis for standard Hindustani, which began to be taught in schools and used in government functions.

Urdu, the heavily Persianised version of Khariboli, replaced Persian as the official language of local administration in North India in the early 19th century. However, the association of the Persian script with Muslims prompted Hindus to develop their own Sanskritised version of the dialect, leading to the formation of Hindi. After India became independent in 1947, the Khariboli-based dialect was officially recognised as the Hindi language, which was declared as one of the official languages for central government functioning.

== Geographical distribution ==
Khariboli is spoken in the rural surroundings, across Yamuna river in Delhi, in western Uttar Pradesh, in the plains of Uttarakhand and in some neighbouring areas of Haryana. The geography of this part of North India is traditionally described as doabs.

In Delhi, parts of Jamnapaar (across Yamuna river)

In Uttar Pradesh, the following districts of the Yamuna-Ganges doab are Khari-speaking:

- Saharanpur
- Muzaffarnagar
- Shamli
- Baghpat
- Meerut
- Ghaziabad
- Hapur
- Northern parts of Bulandshahr
- Northern parts of Gautam Buddha Nagar

In the trans-Ganga area, it is spoken in the following districts of Rohilkhand region in Uttar Pradesh:

- Bijnor
- Amroha
- Moradabad
- Northern parts of Sambhal
- Rampur
- Parts of Bareilly
- Northern parts of Budaun

In Uttarakhand, the following districts of the Ganga-Yamuna doab are partially Khari-speaking:

- Haridwar
- Dehradun plains
- Kotdwar plains of Pauri Garhwal district

In the trans-Ganga area, it is partially spoken in the following districts of Uttarakhand

- Udham Singh Nagar
- Nainital plains

In Haryana, the following districts are Khari-speaking:

- Yamunanagar
- Karnal
- Eastern parts of Kurukshetra
- Eastern parts of Panipat
- Eastern parts of Sonipat

== See also ==
- Standard Hindi
- Standard Urdu
- Awadhi
- Dakhini
- Shauraseni Prakrit
