= Old Hindi =

Earliest historical form of Hindustani (Urdu and Hindi)

- Khariboli
- Region: Around Delhi
- Era: 10th–13th centuries
- Language family: Indo-European: Indo-Iranian; Indo-Aryan; Central; Western Hindi; Old Hindi
- Early form: Shauraseni Prakrit
- Writing system: Brahmic; Arabic

Language codes
- ISO 639-3: –
- Glottolog: None

Old Hindi, (Note: In Hindi-Urdu, this is known as Purānī Hindī (Devanagari: पुरानी हिन्दी, Nastaliq: پرانی ہندی) or Qadīm Hindī (Devanagari: क़दीम हिन्दी, Nastaliq: قدیم ہندی).) also known as Khariboli, was the earliest stage of the Hindustani language, and therefore the ancestor of Hindi and Urdu. Also known as Dehlavi, it was spoken by the people of the region around Delhi, in roughly the 12th–14th centuries during the Delhi Sultanate. It developed from Shauraseni Prakrit.

During the Muslim rule in India, the language began acquiring loanwords from Persian language, which led to the development of Hindustani. It is attested in only a handful of works of literature, including some works by the Indo-Persian Muslim poet Amir Khusrau, verses by the Vaishnava Hindu poet Namdev, and some verses by the Sufi Muslim Baba Farid in the Adi Granth. The works of Bhakti Hindu poet Kabir also may be included, as he used a Khariboli-like dialect. Hindi languages were originally written in different variants of Nagari, and later in the Arabic script in Nastaliq calligraphy.

Some scholars include Apabhraṃśa poetry as early as 769 AD (Dohakosh by Siddha Sarahapad) within Old Hindi, but this is not generally accepted.

With loanwords from Persian added to Old Hindi's Prakritic base, the language evolved into Hindustani, which further developed into the present-day standardised varieties of Hindi and Urdu.

== Etymology ==
The term Old Hindi is a retrospectively coined term to indicate the ancestor language of Modern Standard Hindi, which is today an official language of the government of India. The term Hindi literally means Indian in Classical Persian, and was also called Hindustani to denote that it was the language of Hindustan's capital during the Delhi Sultanate.
