= Languages of Bihar =

Languages spoken in Bihar (India)

Most of the languages of Bihar, the third most populous state of India, belong to the Bihari subgroup of the Indo-Aryan family. Chief among them are Bhojpuri, spoken in the west of the state, Maithili in the north, Magahi in center around capital Patna and in the south of the state. Maithili has official recognition under the Eighth Schedule to the Constitution of India. The official language of Bihar is Modern Standard Hindi, with Standard Urdu serving as a second official language in 15 districts. Bihari Hindi serves as the lingua franca of the region.

Exact speaker numbers for the main Bihari languages are not known because the more educated prefer to speak in Hindi (in formal situations) and so return this answer on the census, while many in rural areas and the urban poor, especially the illiterate, list their language as "Hindi" And "Urdu" on the census as they regard that as the term for their language.

Other languages include the Indo-Aryan languages like Angika, Bajjika, Surjapuri, Bengali and Tharu; the Dravidian languages Kurukh (84,000 speakers in 2011), Kulehiya/Malto (76,000) and Mal Paharia, as well as the Austroasiatic languages Santali (almost half a million speakers in 2011) and Munda.

== History ==
The first success of spreading Modern Standard Hindi occurred in Bihar in 1881, when it displaced Standard Urdu as the sole official medium of the province. In this struggle between Hindi and Urdu standards of the Hindustani language, the potential claims of the three large mother tongues in the region – Bhojpuri, Maithili and Magahi were ignored. After independence, Hindi was again given the sole official status through the Bihar Official Language Act, 1950. Urdu became the second official language in the undivided State of Bihar on 16 August 1947.

== Official languages ==
Hindi is the official languages of the State. Urdu is the second official language of the state.

== Recognised languages ==
=== Maithili ===
Maithili Language in Bihar

Maithili is an Indo-Aryan language native to India and Nepal. In India, it is widely spoken in Bihar. Native speakers are also found in other states and union territories of India, most notably in Jharkhand and the National Capital Territory of Delhi. According to Ethnologue, there are about 12 million Maithili speakers in India as per 2011 Census. However, in the 2011 census of India, It was reported by only 1,35,83,464 people as their mother tongue comprising about 1.12% of the total population of India. It has likely been heavily undercounted because many Maithili speakers still perceive it as a dialect of Hindi and therefore report their mother tongue as Hindi. In Nepal, it is spoken in the eastern Terai, and is the second most prevalent language of Nepal. Tirhuta was formerly the primary script for written Maithili. Less commonly, it was also written in the local variant of Kaithi. Today it is written in the Devanagari script.

In 2003, Maithili was included in the Eighth Schedule of the Indian Constitution as a recognised regional language of India, which allows it to be used in education, government, and other official contexts.

== Other languages ==
=== Angika ===
Angika is mainly spoken in Anga area which includes Munger, Bhagalpur and Banka districts of Bihar and the Santhal Pargana division of Jharkhand. Its speakers are estimated to be around 15 million. In addition to the Anga area, it is also spoken in some parts of Purnia district of Bihar.

=== Bajjika ===
Bajjika is spoken in eastern India and Nepal. Bajjika is spoken in the north-western part of Bihar which mostly spans the modern day Tirhut Division and thus is also referred to as Tirhutiya. In Bihar, it is mainly spoken in the Samastipur, Sitamarhi, Muzaffarpur, Vaishali, Sheohar districts. It is also spoken in a part of the Darbhanga district adjoining Muzaffarpur and Samastipur districts.

Researcher Abhishek Kashyap (2013), based on the 2001 census data, estimated that there were 20 million Bajjika speakers in Bihar (including around 11.46 illiterate adults).

=== Bhojpuri ===
Language and script
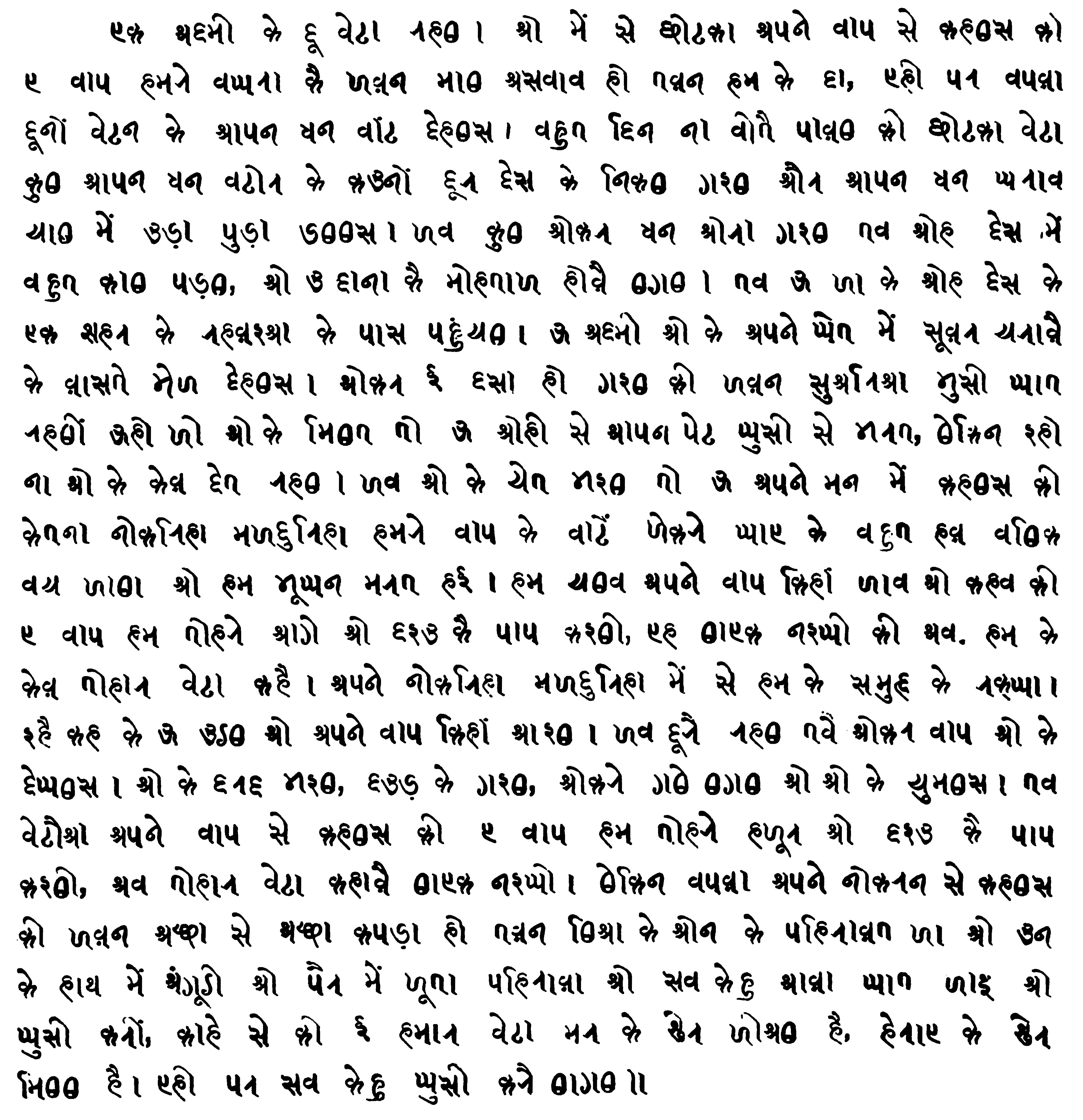
(L) Bhojpuri story written in Kaithi (1898), (R) Maithili language in Tirhuta and Devanagari scripts

Bhojpuri is an Indo-Aryan language predominantly spoken in the Bhojpur region located in the western part of Bihar. It is widely spoken in several districts of Bihar, including West Champaran, East Champaran, Saran, Siwan, Gopalganj, Muzaffarpur, Bhojpur, Buxar, Kaimur, and Rohtas. Apart from western Bihar, the Bhojpur region also encompasses eastern Uttar Pradesh, western Jharkhand, some parts of Madhya Pradesh and Chhattisgarh, as well as the Terai region of Nepal. In Nepal, Bhojpuri is the third most spoken language, primarily used in the central and eastern Terai regions. Globally, there are approximately 150 million Bhojpuri speakers.

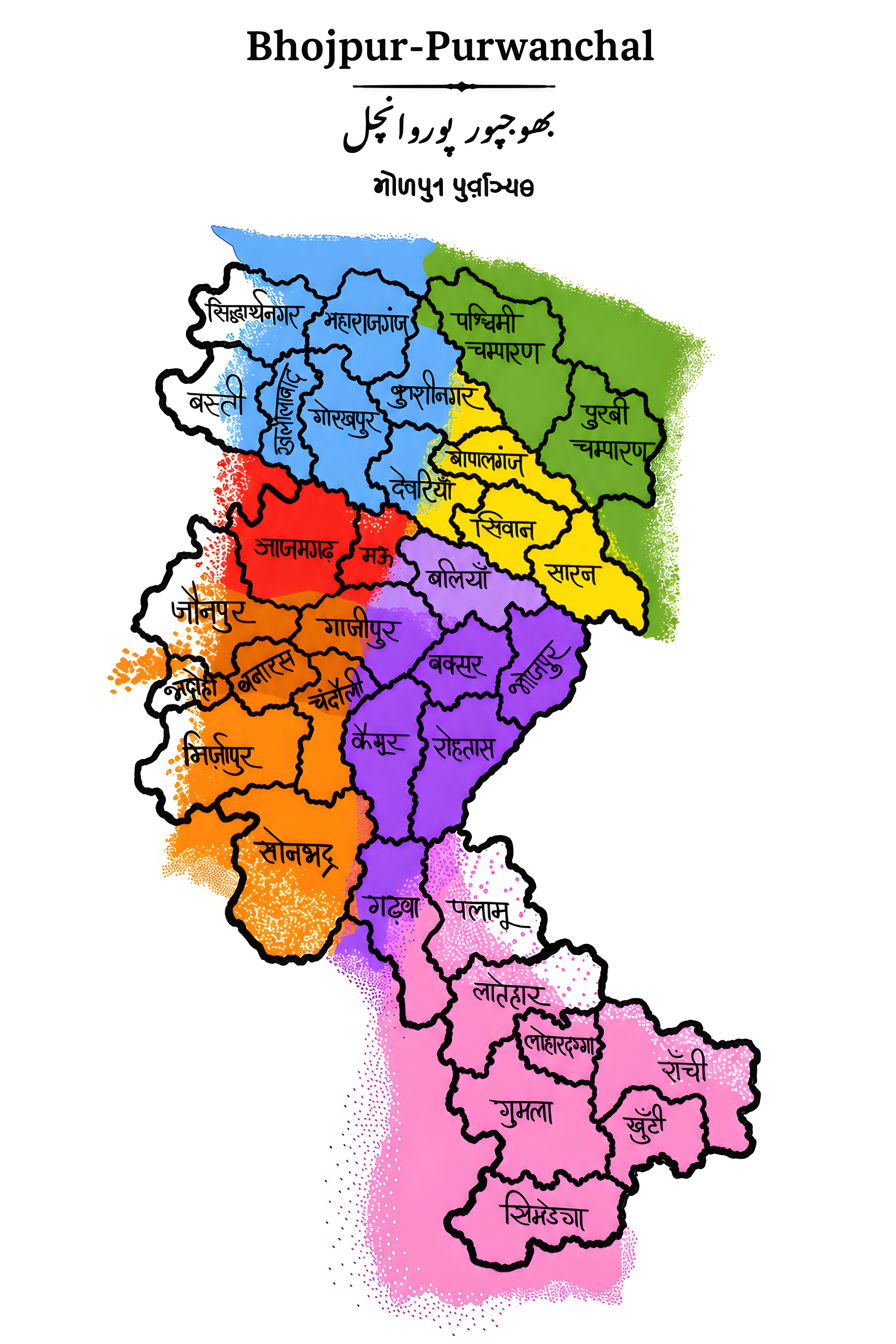
Cite: https://doi.org/10.5281/zenodo.21361541

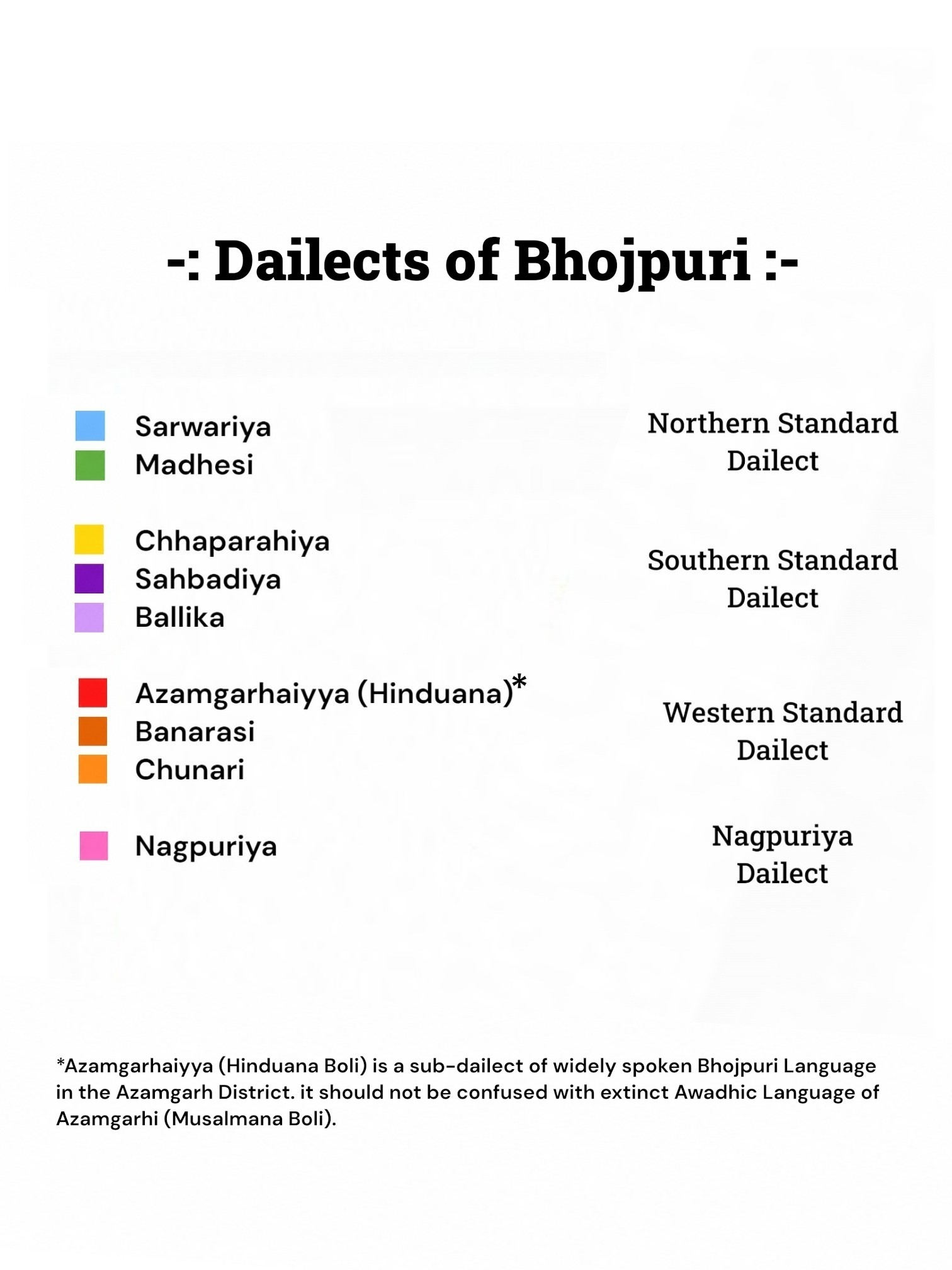
Cite: https://doi.org/10.5281/zenodo.21361541

Bhojpuri has several dialects: Southern Bhojpuri, Northern Bhojpuri, Western Bhojpuri, and Nagpuria. The Bhojpuri variant of the Kaithi script is the indigenous script of the Bhojpuri language. However, in modern times, Devanagari has become more commonly used for writing Bhojpuri.

There is a demand for the recognition of Bhojpuri language, its inclusion in the Eighth Schedule of the Indian Constitution, and its status as an official language in Bihar.

=== Magahi ===
Magahi is spoken in the Magadh region in southern Bihar. Its heartland is Patna, Jehanabad, Nalanda, Nawada, Gaya and Sheikhpura districts, with the centres of Magahi culture being Patna, earlier called Pataliputra, and Gaya. In the west, in western Patna district, Arwal and Aurangabad districts, Magahi blends into Bhojpuri spoken across the Sone River. Across the Ganga Magahi borders various dialects closely related to Maithili. In the east, in Lakhisarai and Jamui districts, Magahi blends into Angika.

=== Khortha ===
Khortha is a language variety spoken in far-southern Bihar adjoining Jharkhand, on the Chota Nagpur Plateau. Districts where Khortha is spoken include Aurangabad, Gaya, Nawada and Jamui.

=== Santali ===
Santhali is a Munda language spoken by the Santhal Adivasis in its heartland in Santhal Parganas in northeastern Jharkhand. As an extension of this population, Santhali is spoken by many people in Jamui, Banka, Munger and Bhagalpur districts. Many Santhali people were also brought to eastern Bihar (Purnia division) as agricultural workers, so large numbers are also found in Araria, Purnia, Katihar and Kishanganj districts.

=== Surjapuri ===
Surjapuri is a language variety spoken in Purnia division (Araria, Purnia, Katihar and Kishanganj districts), and adjoining areas of West Bengal, although it has been clubbed under Hindi in the census. In fact, it is more closely related to Assamese and Bengali than Hindi, being the western extension of the Kamata group of lects like Rajbanshi in neighbouring Nepal and Rangpuri in nearby Bangladesh. In the west it blends with eastern dialects of Maithili.

=== Tharu ===
Tharu is spoken by the Tharu people of the Terai region in Nepal and neighboring regions of Uttarakhand, Uttar Pradesh and Bihar in India. Tharu language is one of the major language spoken in Nepal. Although their own precise classification within Indo-Aryan remains uncertain, Tharu languages have superficial similarities with neighbouring languages such as Awadhi, Maithili, Bengali, Rajbanshi and Bhojpuri. In Bihar it is spoken in northern parts of East Champaran and West Champaran districts.

== See also ==
- Hindi in Bihar
  - Urdu in Bihar
- Bihari languages
- Eastern Indo-Aryan languages
- Languages of India
- Languages of Nepal
- Languages of South Asia
