= Western Hindi languages =

Indo-Aryan language and dialect cluster of northwest and central India

Western Hindi
- Geographic distribution: Braj, Bundelkhand, Kannauj, Haryana, Western UP
- Ethnicity: Brajis, Bundelis, Haryanvis, Kannaujis
- Native speakers: approx. 272 million in India and Pakistan
- Linguistic classification: Indo-European: Indo-Iranian; Indo-Aryan; Central Indo-Aryan; Western Hindi
- Early form: Sauraseni Prakrit

Language codes
- Glottolog: west2812
- Geographical distribution of Western Hindi languages

The Western Hindi languages, are a branch of the Indo-Aryan language family spoken chiefly in Haryana, Western Uttar Pradesh and Bundelkhand region of Madhya Pradesh, in Northwest and Central India. The Western Hindi languages evolved from Sauraseni Prakrit. The most-spoken language in the Western Hindi language family is Hindustani (comprising the standard registers of Standard Hindi and Standard Urdu), deriving from the Khariboli dialect of Delhi.

== Geographical extent ==
Western Hindi languages are much more widespread and spoken than their Eastern counterpart. Western Hindi languages are spoken in India and Pakistan. In India, it is chiefly spoken in Western Uttar Pradesh, in the Bundelkhand region and the Braj region and in pockets of the Deccan region. In Pakistan, it is spoken by Muhajirs (a multi-origin ethnic group of Pakistan, migrated from various parts of present-day India mostly after the partition). Apart from this, Hindustani forms the lingua franca in a large region in Pakistan and North India (Hindi Belt) and the trade language in Andaman and Arunachal Pradesh. A version of Hindustani heavily influenced by Magadhi, Maithili and Bhojpuri, called Bihari Hindi is spoken in Patna and some other urban areas in Bihar. Another version influenced by Marathi, called Bombay Hindi is spoken in Mumbai and neighbouring urban regions in Maharashtra.

== Languages and dialects ==
- Braj Bhasha (1.6 m), spoken in western Uttar Pradesh and adjacent districts of Rajasthan and Haryana.
- Bundeli (6.5 m), spoken in south-western Uttar Pradesh and west-central Madhya Pradesh.
- Haryanvi (10 m), spoken in Chandigarh, Haryana, and as a minority in Punjab and Delhi.
- Hindustani (including Hindi and Urdu (250 m)), spoken in western Uttar Pradesh, Delhi, and after partition in Pakistan.
  - Andaman Creole Hindi
  - Arunachali Hindi
  - Begamati
  - Bangalori Urdu
  - Bihari Hindi (Not to be confused with the Bihari languages, a group of Eastern Indo-Aryan languages)
  - Bombay Hindi
  - Dhakaiya Urdu
  - Deccani
  - Haflong Hindi
  - Hinglish
  - Hyderabadi Urdu
  - Judeo-Urdu
  - Kalkatiya Urdu
  - Karkhandari Urdu
  - Kauravi (Khariboli)
  - Rekhta
  - Urdish
- Kannauji (9.5 m), spoken in west-central Uttar Pradesh.
- To Western Hindi Ethnologue adds Sansi (Sansiboli), Chamari (a spurious language), Bhaya, Gowari (not a separate language), and Ghera.
