= GHR =

GHR may refer to:

- Postal code for Għargħur, Malta
- ISO 639-3 code for Ghera language
- Growth hormone receptor
- Guard Hussar Regiment (Denmark), of the Royal Danish Army
- Gustav Heinrich Ralph von Koenigswald (1902–1982), German paleontologist and geologist
- Greatest Hits Radio Network, a number of radio stations in the UK
