= Begamati zuban =

Urdu sociolect spoken by women

- Women's sociolect of Urdu
- بیگماتی زبان
- Native to: India
- Region: Delhi, Lucknow
- Ethnicity: Delhiite, Lucknowite women
- Extinct: 1970s
- Language family: Indo-European: Indo-Iranian; Indo-Aryan; Central Indo-Aryan; Western Hindi; Hindustani; Urdu; Begamati zuban
- Writing system: Perso-Arabic script (Urdu alphabet)

Language codes
- ISO 639-3: –

Begamati zuban (بیگماتی زبان; also written as begamati zubaan, begamati zabān) is a sociolect of Urdu spoken by the noblewomen (begums) residing in seclusion (purdah) in royal forts and palaces in Delhi and some other Urdu-speaking towns in India, primarily in the 19th century but not completely dying out until the 1970s. One of the main ways the sociolect is known is through its representation in 19th century novels. It is not fully preserved, and what is known of it today is largely the result of its former documentation.

== Characteristics ==
The sociolect is described by historian Gail Minaut as "earthy, graphic and colourful", which stands in contrast to women's language in cultures such as Japan, where women may speak less bluntly than men in Japanese, or the United States, where women traditionally use more euphemisms, deference and superlatives in American English. This is because women living in purdah were separate from other society so their sociolect was developed to speak with each other, not with men, and because the women were not highly educated and so did not learn "the flowery and polite phrases of Persianised Urdu".

Variations of begamati zabān were spoken in Lucknow, Hyberabad and other Urdu-speaking towns, but it is the Delhi version that was described in most sources. Rais Ahmad Jafri describes the Lucknow version differently to the descriptions of the Delhi version discussed by Gail Minault. "The Begamati language of Lucknow is renowned for its sweetness and charm. Naturally, such a refined and polished language could only be found within the royal palaces. The letters written by the begums of Wajid Ali Shah are among the finest examples of this elevated form of Urdu."

Begamati zuban has many terms for endearment and blessings, according to Minhaut, who describes the women calling each other names like bua or vari (my dear/dearest), or bhina (younger sister) as well as terms usually kept for men, such as bela (son). Blessings would also often include a woman's husband and children, as in kaleja thanda rahe or pet thanda rahe which roughly mean "may your children be happy/have long lives/never disappoint you." Minhaut interprets this as a form of deference to the women's utter dependency on their men and children, and notes that while the women might tell each other to drop dead but would never wish each others' husbands or children dead.

Writing was taboo for these women, but some books were still written for them in their sociolect. For example, the male author Sayyid Ahmad Dehlavi (1846-1918) wrote several educational books for women in begamati zuban, on child rearing, on having a good relationship with your husband, on time management and similar subjects. Writers like Ismat Chughtai (1911-1991) also included the sociolect in their work.

== History ==
Indian women, traditionally, observed strict purdah (seclusion), and this practice was a key factor in creating a linguistic distinction between standard Urdu and Begamati Urdu. The language of the begums clearly reflected their confined social environment. In the early periods, many of them were unfamiliar with formal grammar, as their lives were spent within a highly restricted domestic sphere. Their speech remained limited to the boundaries of forts and mansions, shielded from external influences, particularly those of the male world. In North India, the begums of the Qila-e-Mualla (Imperial Fort) enforced strict rules of seclusion upon their daughters, to the extent that they were protected even from the shadows of unrelated men. Royal residences included women's quarters (zanana), where the women spent every moment of their lives. All social rituals like weddings, funerals, and other ceremonies were conducted within these enclosures. Young unmarried girls were even veiled from elder women outside their immediate family, in order to preserve their reputations. As the saying goes: "A palanquin came from her parental home, and another left from her husband's home," implying that a girl lived in seclusion all her life. These cultural and social factors contributed to the development of a distinct variety of Urdu spoken by the begums, linguistically distant from the formal standard language.

== Decline ==
The gradual disappearance of Begamati Urdu was already being observed as early as 1976. In his book Dilli ki Begamati Zaban, Muhiuddin Hasan noted that although the dialect had not yet vanished entirely, the distinctions that once defined it were rapidly fading. According to him, the original residents of the Qila-e-Mualla (Imperial Fort), who were the true custodians of this speech, had gradually migrated, while people from other regions began settling in Delhi. The social custom of purdah, once integral to the lives of the begums, also declined with time. As a result, the unique features of Begamati language began to erode, with increasing influence from Punjabi accents in local speech.

Sania, a researcher at Jamia Millia Islamia, further explains that social reformers such as Deputy Nazir Ahmad and Altaf Hussain Hali regarded the language as inappropriate or unrefined, which contributed to its decline. She adds "With the spread of girls’ education, the languages spoken in schools gradually replaced Begamati language. Even so, traces of Begamati language still survive in everyday conversation particularly in idioms related to the kitchen and women’s domestic lives."

== See also ==
- Nyōbō kotoba - a type of language used by Japanese court ladies in the Muromachi period
- Language and gender
