= Gurgula language =

Rajasthani language of Pakistan

Gurgula
- گُرگُلا
- Native to: Pakistan
- Native speakers: (35,000 cited 2000)
- Language family: Indo-European: Indo-Iranian; Indo-Aryan; Western; Rajasthani–Marwari; Rajasthani; Gurgula

Language codes
- ISO 639-3: ggg
- Glottolog: gurg1240

Gurgula is a Rajasthani language of Pakistan. Spoken by Gurgula people. It is lexically quite similar with Ghera, but very different grammatically.
