= 2001 census of India =

14th census of India

14th census of India
- 9 to 28 February 2001
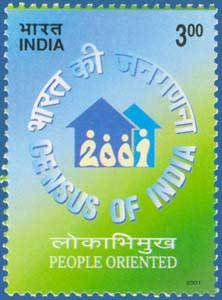
- 2001 Census logo on a postal stamp

General information
- Country: India

Results
- Total population: 1,028,737,436 (21.5%)
- Most populous state: Uttar Pradesh (166,053,600)
- Least populous state: Sikkim (541,902)

The 2001 census of India was the 14th in a series of censuses held in India every decade since 1871.

The population of India was counted as 1,028,737,436 consisting of 532,223,090 males and 496,514,346 females. The total population increased by 182,310,397, 21.5% more than the 846,427,039 people counted during the 1991 census.

== Religious demographics ==
Hindus comprise 82.75 crore (80.45%) and Muslims were 13.8 crore (13.4%) in the 2001 census. Census 2001 showed 108 faiths under the head "Other Religions and Persuasion" (ORP) in India. 700,000 people did not state their religion.

Population trends for major religious groups in India (2001)
Religious group	Population %
Hindu	80.45%
Muslim	13.4%
Christian	2.34%
Sikh	1.89%
Buddhist	0.74%
Animist, others	0.43%
Jain	0.46%

== Language demographics ==
Hindi is the most widely spoken language in northern parts of India. The Indian census takes the widest possible definition of "Hindi" as a broad variety of "Hindi languages". According to 2001 census, 53.6% of Indian population know Hindi, in which 41% of them have declared Hindi as their native language or mother tongue. English is known to 12.18% Indians in the 2001 census. The number of bilingual speakers in India is 25.50 crore, which is 24.8% of the population in 2001. India (780) has the world's second highest number of languages, after Papua New Guinea (839).

First, second, and third languages by number of speakers in India (2001 census)
Language	First language speakers		Second language speakers	Third language speakers	Total speakers	
Language	number	% of total pop.	Second language speakers	Third language speakers	number	% of total pop.
Hindi	422,048,642	41.03%	98,207,180	31,160,696	551,416,518	53.60%
English	226,449	0.02%	86,125,221	38,993,066	125,344,736	12.18%
Bengali	83,369,769	8.10%	6,637,222	1,108,088	91,115,079	8.86%
Telugu	74,002,856	7.19%	9,723,626	1,266,019	84,992,501	8.26%
Marathi	71,936,894	6.99%	9,546,414	2,701,498	84,184,806	8.18%
Tamil	60,793,814	5.91%	4,992,253	956,335	66,742,402	6.49%
Urdu	51,536,111	5.01%	6,535,489	1,007,912	59,079,512	5.74%
Kannada	37,924,011	3.69%	11,455,287	1,396,428	50,775,726	4.94%
Gujarati	46,091,617	4.48%	3,476,355	703,989	50,271,961	4.89%
Odia	33,017,446	3.21%	3,272,151	319,525	36,609,122	3.56%
Malayalam	33,066,392	3.21%	499,188	195,885	33,761,465	3.28%
Sanskrit	14,135	<0.01%	1,234,931	3,742,223	4,991,289	0.49%

== Graphical summaries ==
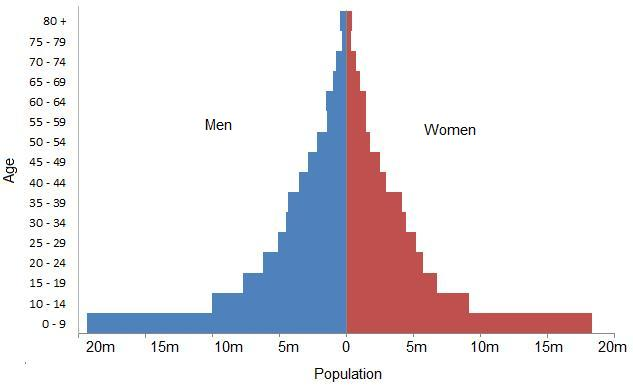
Overview of 2001 population, separated by gender and age bracket.

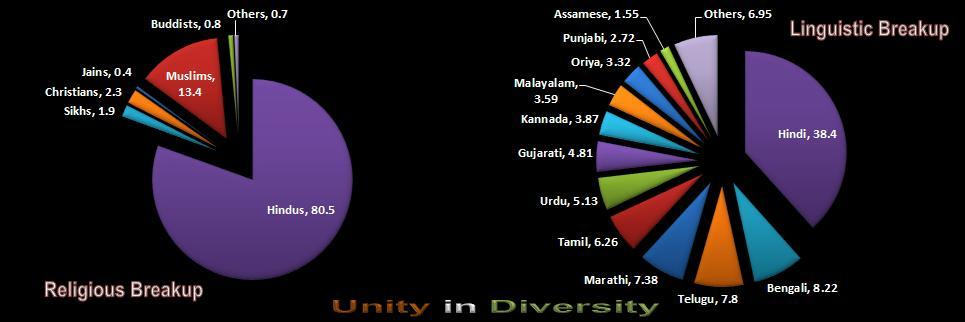
2001 overview based on religious affiliation and language.

== See also ==
- 1991 census of India
- 2011 census of India
- Demographics of India
