= Kuhli Kalan =

Village in Punjab, India

Coordinates: 30.671°N 75.986°E

Kuhli Kalan is a village in Punjab, India. Its zip code is 141119.

== Brief history ==
The village was created 700 years ago. Most people run their household through agriculture and dairy farms. They farm rice, corn, wheat, and many other vegetables. There are no major secondary industries in the village

== Politics ==
There were many leaders of the village from when it was first started. The political structure consists of 7 members. There is a head called the Sarpanch. Under the Sarpanch there are 6 lower members that act as advisors to the Sarpanch. These 6 members are called Panches. The political system does not discriminate members due to gender. Any male or female can be a member.

=== Voters ===
Year	Men	Woman	Total
2014	582	491	1073
2019	587	512	1099

== Population ==
The population of the village was 1464 people (781 men, 683 women) as of 2011.

== Culture ==
The main language spoken in the region of Kuhli Kalan is Punjabi. Other languages spoken in Kuhli Kalan are English, Urdu and Hindi. There is a school in the village called Kuhli Kalan Primary School which starts from 1st grade and goes on to 5th grade. The school was established in 1953. Some of the first students of the school include Dr. Rajwant Singh MBBS, Nachatter Singh, Bachitter Singh, Sucha Singh, Narang Singh, and Teja Singh. The village is a multi-cultural place. The village is very diverse in terms of culture. There is also a Sikh Temple established in the village of Kuhli Kalan.

The main surname of the families of the village people is Pandher. Other surnames also include Dhaliwal, Mann, Gillchalli, Lotay, and Dhugal.

=== Religions ===
The main religions in the village are Sikhism, Hinduism, and Islam. There is a majority of Sikhs in the village. There is a Sikh Temple known as a Gurudwara named Sikh Temple Kuhli Kalan which is the main temple in the village. It was constructed around 18th century. The temple is located towards the west side of the village. The temple is fairly associated with Jaiton da Morcha.

Years	Guruduara President	Member
2012	Surjit Singh (first President)	Baldev Singh, Pretim Singh
2014	Jagdish Singh S/o Nahar Singh	Avtar Singh (cashier)

On the east side of the village is another Sikh temple which is called Ravidas Temple. This temple was built in the 21st century. There is also a mosque in the village. There is also a Dera that is known by the name of Dera Khoohiwala which was made in the 19th century by a man named Charndas Bawa Ji. Recently a Mandir of Baba Balmik has been inaugurated between 2011 and 2015 near Guru Ravidas Temple.

== Old Structures ==
=== Main Gate(Pind da Darwaja) ===
Main Gate in which people entered the village. The gate was during the 20th century. It used to function as a meeting place for the Panchiyat. In a sense, it was used as a courtroom.

Picture of the Main Gate

=== Old Wells ===
The whole village used to get water from these places before the introduction of pumps and motors. There were three other places like these from which the village got water. These two places are called Gora Khou, Pathi Wala Khou, and Khara Khou. All these locations are closed. After 1954, pumps were introduced to the village. The first people to have access to a pump in the village were Bachan Singh and Mukhtiar Singh Lathale Wale.

==== Gora Khou ====
This well was located towards the NE side of the village. Water from this village was used for drinking and agricultural purposes. Had the best quality of water as described by villagers (ਅੱਜ ਕੱਲ ਮੀਤੇ ਦੀ ਮੋਟਰ ਜੋ ਕਿ ਬਚਨ ਸਿੰਘ ਦਾ ਪੋਤਾ ਹੈ )

==== Khara Khou ====
This well was located towards the NW side of the village. Water from this village was mainly used for agricultural purposes. The well was named after the quality of the water because the villagers did not like the taster of the water so it wasn't used for drinking purposes. The name came from the Punjabi word Khara which means brackish. Brackish is a term used for something that is unpleasant or distasteful hence the name.

==== Pathi Wala Khou ====
This well was located towards the SW side of the village. This well was also used for drinking and agricultural purposes.

==== Bhaman Wala Khou ====
This well was located towards the center of the village. It was in use from early 20th century to mid 20th century. The water from this well was used by higher-level class of people. The middle class and lower class of people were not allowed to drink from this well.
