= Gypsy language =

Gypsy may refer to any of the several languages of the Romani:

- The various Romani languages of Europe
- The Para-Romani languages languages descending from them
- The Domari language of the Middle East
- The Seb Seliyer language of Iran
- The Lomavren language of Armenia

== See also ==
- Kanjari language, an Indo-Aryan language of the Kanjar people of India and Pakistan
