= Sansi language =

Endangered Indo-Aryan language of India

Sansi
- प्रतिबंध, پابندیاں.
- Native to: India, Pakistan
- Region: Rajasthan
- Ethnicity: Sansi
- Native speakers: (80,000 cited 2000–2002)
- Language family: Indo-European: Indo-Iranian; Indo-Aryan; Central Zone; Western Hindi; Sansi
- Writing system: Devanagari, Perso-Arabic

Language codes
- ISO 639-3: Either: ssi – Sansi kbu – Kabutra
- Glottolog: sans1271 Sansi kabu1254 Kabutra

The Sansi language, Sansiboli, or Bhilki, is a highly endangered Indo-Aryan language of the Central group. The language is spoken by the nomadic Sansi people of the Indian subcontinent.

Ethnologue sees it as part of Western Hindi. Some sources also mention it as a dialect of the Rajasthani language. Glottolog links it to Punjabi. Kabutra, spoken by a thousand people in Pakistan, is mutually intelligible.
