= Bhaya language =

Indo-Aryan language of Pakistan

Bhaya
- Native to: Pakistan
- Region: Sindh province
- Native speakers: (70 cited 1998)
- Language family: Indo-European: Indo-Iranian; Indo-Aryan; Central or Western Indo-Aryan; Western Hindi or Rajasthani; (unclassified); Bhaya

Language codes
- ISO 639-3: bhe
- Glottolog: bhay1238
- ELP: Bhaya

Bhaya is a moribund and possibly extinct Indo-Aryan language spoken in the lower Sindh province. According to Ethnologue, it belongs to the Western Hindi subgroup, and possesses considerable lexical and morphemic similarities with neighbouring languages, but leaves it unclassified beyond this. Glottolog classifies it as part of the Western Rajasthani languages instead. An unwritten language, it has often been subject to erroneous, arbitrary, or politically motivated designation as a dialect.
