= Karkhandari Urdu =

Urdu dialect in Delhi

Karkhandari
- Old Delhi Urdu dialect
- Native to: India
- Region: Delhi
- Ethnicity: Delhiite
- Native speakers: 50,000 (1961)
- Language family: Indo-European: Indo-Iranian; Indo-Aryan; Central Indo-Aryan; Western Hindi; Hindustani; Urdu; Karkhandari
- Writing system: Perso-Arabic script (Urdu alphabet)

Language codes
- ISO 639-3: –

Karkhandari Urdu is a dialect of Urdu historically spoken in Old Delhi (Shahjahanabad, Delhi-6). It is considered a traditional form of Delhi Urdu, though today it is rarely spoken and survives only among a few remaining speakers.

== Etymology ==
The term Karkhandāri is derived from the Urdu word kārkhānā, meaning a workshop or manufacturing establishment. Under the Mughals, kārkhānās were specialised workshops that produced luxury goods, textiles, weapons, and other items for the imperial household and military. Some brought several stages of production, including weaving, embroidery, and brocade work, under one roof. The suffix -dār denotes a worker or proprietor. The term Karkhandāri therefore came to refer to the colloquial speech associated with craftsmen and artisans, although its use was not limited to these occupational groups.

== Distribution ==
According to literary scholar Gopi Chand Narang, Karkhandari was a sociolect used in the daily speech of artisans, craftsmen and small traders living in the old city of Delhi. Despite demographic and cultural changes in the capital, speakers of this dialect remain concentrated in specific parts of the historical city. The areas traditionally inhabited by Karkhandari speakers were geographically bounded by Chāndni Chowk to the north, Faiz Bazaar to the east, Asaf Ali Road to the south, and Lahori Gate to the west. The core population of speakers resided in the southwestern lanes near Jama Masjid and Lāl Kuan Bazaar, including neighborhoods such as Chitli Qabar, Kucha Chailān, Kalān Mahal, Matiya Mahal, Bhojla Pahāri, Pahari Imli, Churi wālān, Tokri wālān, Soi wālān, Phātak Teliyan, Bulbuli Khāna, Mohalla Qabaristan, Gali Shāh Tāra, Kucha Pandit, Mohalla Rod garān, Farrāsh Khāna, and Gali Batāshān. Additional clusters were found northeast of Lal Kuan in Gali Qāsim Jān, Ballimārān Bazaar, Haveli Hissām-uddin Haider, Bāra Dari Sher Afgan Khan, and Ahāta Kalē Sāhib. A few families near Khāri bāoli, in Phātak Habash Khān, continue to preserve the dialect. Beyond the old city walls, Karkhandari speakers have also been identified in areas like Kishanganj, Shīsh Mahal, Qassāb pura, Beri Wāla Bāgh, and parts of Bāra Hindu Rao.

== Influences ==
Karkhandāri as well as old Deccani show several phonological and grammatical similarities now absent in modern Urdu and Hindi.
