= Sobhagya Singh Shekhawat =

Indian writer

Saubhagya Singh Shekhawat
- Born: 22 July 1924; Bhagatpura, Sikar, India
- Died: 10 December 2016 (aged 92); Bhagatpura, Sikar, India
- Education: Vernacular Final (VF)
- Occupations: writer and poet
- Years active: 1950–2016
- Known for: Rajasthani literature
- Spouse: Padam Kanwer Medtaniji

Saubhagya Singh Shekhawat (22 July 1924 – 10 December 2016) was an Indian Rajasthani language writer.

Though moderately educated, he is known as a high-ranking scholar who contributed to almost all the research journals of Rajasthan. He is recognized as an expert on the ancient Dingal language. He died on 10 December 2016 at the age of 92 in his hometown.
