= Shekhawati language =

Indo-Aryan language of Rajasthan, India

Shekhawati
- शेखावाटी
- Native to: India (Shekhawati region of Rajasthan)
- Native speakers: 3 million (2002)
- Language family: Indo-European: Indo-Iranian; Indo-Aryan; Western; Rajasthani; Shekhawati
- Writing system: Devanagari

Language codes
- ISO 639-3: swv
- Glottolog: shek1243

Shekhawati is an Indo-Aryan language of north-eastern Rajasthan, India. It belongs to the Rajasthani languages group and is spoken by an estimated three million people in the Shekhawati region, which comprises the Jhunjhunu, Neem-Ka-Thana and Sikar districts according to Census 1931 provided by Government of India.

A descriptive grammar of Shekhawati was published in 2001. The word order of the language is typically SOV, and the phonology is characterised by the presence of implosive consonants and a distinct high tone.

Shekhawati also has an influence of Haryanvi and it is more or less a dialect of Marwari itself. This region's vocabulary has been absorbed from distant lands such as Bombay and Calcutta. This is primarily due to distant travelling of Shekhawati Merchants. It is also a bridge between Western Marwari and Central Marwari.
