= Nyōbō kotoba =

Words used by Japanese women in the Muromachi period

Nyōbō kotoba (Japanese: 女房言葉 or 女房詞; lit. 'woman's words') was a cant that was originally used by Japanese court ladies during the Muromachi period, and subsequently spread and came to be thought of as a women's language. It consisted primarily of a special vocabulary of words for food, clothing, and other household items. Many of the created words were descriptions of the thing they were naming, whether that was a description of a characteristic, shape, color, or usage.

Many nyōbō kotoba words were formed by adding the prefix o- (御), which indicates politeness, or by dropping part of a word and adding -moji (文字; lit. 'character, letter').

Some nyōbō kotoba passed into general usage and are today part of the standard Japanese language.

== Examples ==
Nyōbō kotoba	Meaning	Source
ishiishi (いしいし)	dango	
okowa (おこわ)	rice with red beans	kowameshi (強飯)
okawa (おかわ)	toilet	kawaya (厠)
onaka (お腹)	stomach	naka (中; 'middle')
onara (おなら)	fart (n.)	narasu (鳴らす; 'to sound')
okaka (おかか)	dried bonito flakes	katsuobushi (鰹節)
okaki (おかき)	kakimochi (type of rice cracker)	kakimochi (欠餅)
okabe (お壁)	tofu	shirakabe (白壁; lit. 'white plaster wall')
okumoji (奥文字)	wife	okusama (奥様)
osatsu (おさつ)	sweet potato	satsuma-imo (薩摩芋; lit. 'Satsuma potato')
odai (お台)	cooked rice; food	odai (お台; 'dining table')
otsuke (おつけ)	clear soup broth, miso soup	
onigiri (おにぎり)	rice ball	nigirimeshi (握り飯)
oman (お饅)	steamed bun with filling	manjuu (饅頭)
oyoru (御寝る)	to sleep (v.)	oyoru (お夜; 'sleep, rest (n.)')
kamoji (髢)	hair	kami (髪)
komoji (こもじ)	carp	koi (鯉)
shamoji (しゃもじ)	rice paddle	shakushi (杓子)
sumoji (すもじ), osumoji (おすもじ)	sushi	sushi (寿司)
make (まけ)	menstrual period	
naminohana (波の花)	salt	naminohana (波の花; lit. 'crest of a wave')
nimoji (にもじ)	garlic	ninniku (大蒜)
hitomoji (一文字)	spring onion	
yumoji (ゆもじ)	yukata (type of summer kimono)	yukata (浴衣)

== See also ==
- Gender differences in spoken Japanese
- Japanese honorifics
- Begamati language — a sociolect of Urdu spoken by court ladies in purdah in Delhi
