= Hindi in Bihar =

Official language in Bihar

Hindi is one of the official languages in the Indian state of Bihar. Although Hindustani is the lingua-franca of the region, the majority of the people natively speak one of the Bihari languages.

== Hindi journalism ==
Biharbandhu was the first Hindi newspaper published from Bihar. It was started in 1872 by Keshav Ram Bhatta, a Maharashtrian Brahman settled in Biharsharif. Hindi journalism in Bihar, and specially Patna, could make little headway initially. It was mainly due to lack of respect for Hindi among the people at large. Many Hindi journals took birth and after a lapse of time vanished. Many journals were shelved even in the embryonic state. But once Hindi enlisted the official support, it started making a dent into the remote areas in Bihar. Hindi journalism also acquired wisdom and maturity, and its longevity was prolonged. Hindi was introduced in the law courts in Bihar in 1880.

== 20th-century publications ==
The beginning of the twentieth century was marked by several notable new publications. A monthly magazine named Bharat Ratna was started from Patna in 1901. It was followed by Kshtriya Hitaishi, Aryavarta from Dinapure, Patna, Udyoga and Chaitanya Chandrika. Udyog was edited by Vijyaanand Tripathy, a famous poet of the time and Chaitanya Chandrika by Krishna Chaitanya Goswami, a literary figure of that time. These literary activities were not confined to Patna alone but to many districts of Bihar.

== Constitutional issues ==
Despite the large number of speakers of Bihari languages, these languages, except Maithili (which is recognised under the Eighth Schedule of the Constitution of India), have not been constitutionally recognised in India. Hindi is the language used for educational and official matters in Bihar, with English occasionally used in education and government. These languages were legally absorbed under the subordinate label of Hindi in the 1961 Census. Such state and national politics are creating conditions for language endangerment.

== Struggle between languages ==
The first success for spreading Modern Standard Hindi occurred in Bihar in 1881, when Hindi displaced Urdu as the sole official standard of the province. In this struggle between competing Hindi and Urdu standards of the Hindustani language, the potential claims of the three large mother tongues in the region – Magahi, Bhojpuri and Maithili were ignored. After independence, Hindi was again given the sole official status through the Bihar Official Language Act, 1950. Urdu became the second official language in the undivided State of Bihar on 16 August 1989.

Maithili was officially recognised by the government of India in 2003, after an active movement led by Maithili speakers. Proponents have called Bhojpuri, Magahi, Angika and Bajjika to receive the same status.

== Statistics ==
The number of speakers of Bihari languages is difficult to indicate because of unreliable sources. In the urban region, most educated speakers of the language name Hindi as their language because this is what they speak at home and use in formal contexts. The uneducated and the rural population of the region return Hindi as their language.

== See also ==
- Bihari Hindi
