= Kabutra language =

Indo-Aryan language of Sindh, Pakistan

Kabutra
- ڪبوترا
- Native to: Pakistan
- Region: Sindh (Kunri, Nara Dhoro, and Umerkot)
- Native speakers: (1,000 cited 1998)
- Language family: Indo-European: Indo-Iranian; Indo-Aryan; Western Indo-Aryan; Rajasthani; Kabutra

Language codes
- ISO 639-3: kbu
- Glottolog: kabu1254 Kabutra

Kabutra (also known as Nat or Natra) is an endangered Indo-Aryan language spoken in Sindh, Pakistan. Kabutra is almost identical to neighboring Sansi in India. Kabutra is unwritten, but may be written with a variety of the Arabic script.
