= Seb Seliyer language =

Indic language spoken in Iran

Seb Seliyer
- Native to: Iran
- Region: Firuzkuh
- Language family: Indo-European: Indo-Iranian; Indo-Aryan; Central?; Seb Seliyer

Language codes
- ISO 639-3: None (mis)
- Glottolog: sebs1234

Seb Seliyer (lit. "tin-worker") is an Indic language spoken by a Romani-like ethnic group in Iran, but their language is distinct from that of other Roma in Iran, who speak closely related dialects. The language has largely converged on Mazandarani, but core vocabulary remains Indic.
