= Ghera language =

Indo-Aryan language of Pakistan

Ghera
- Native to: Pakistan
- Region: Hyderabad, Sindh
- Native speakers: (10,000 cited 1998)
- Language family: Indo-European: Indo-Iranian; Indo-Aryan; Central; Western Hindi; Ghera

Language codes
- ISO 639-3: ghr
- Glottolog: gher1238

Ghera, also known as Bara, is an Indo-Aryan language of Pakistan. It is spoken by around 10,000 people in a single area within the city of Hyderabad. It belongs to the Western Hindi language group. It shares 87% of its basic vocabulary with the Gurgula language, but in its grammar it is substantially different.
