= Andaman Creole Hindi =

Trade language of the Andaman Islands, India

- Andaman Hindi
- Native to: India
- Region: Andaman and Nicobar Islands
- Native speakers: (10,000 cited 1994)
- Language family: Hindi-Bengali-Tamil-based creole: Andaman Creole Hindi

Official status
- Recognised minority language in: India: Andaman and Nicobar Islands

Language codes
- ISO 639-3: hca
- Glottolog: anda1280

Andaman Creole Hindi is a trade language of the Andaman Islands, spoken as a native language especially in Port Blair and villages to the south. Singh (1994) describes it as a creolisation of Hindi, Bengali and Tamil.

== History ==
The use of Hindi on the islands originates with the establishment of a penal colony in Port Blair in 1868. With the arrival of British generals came Hindi-speaking Indian officials.

Later, after Indian independence, and especially after the independence of Bangladesh, Bengali refugees were motivated to move to the islands, along with other peoples speaking many other languages, notably Tamil, due to incentives given by the government.
