= Central Indo-Aryan languages =

Group of Indo-Aryan languages

Central Indo-Aryan
- Hindi languages
- Geographic distribution: South Asia (Hindi Belt)
- Linguistic classification: Indo-European: Indo-Iranian; Indo-Aryan; Central Indo-Aryan
- Subdivisions: Western Hindi; Eastern Hindi

Language codes
- Glottolog: None west2812 Western Hindi east2726 Eastern Hindi
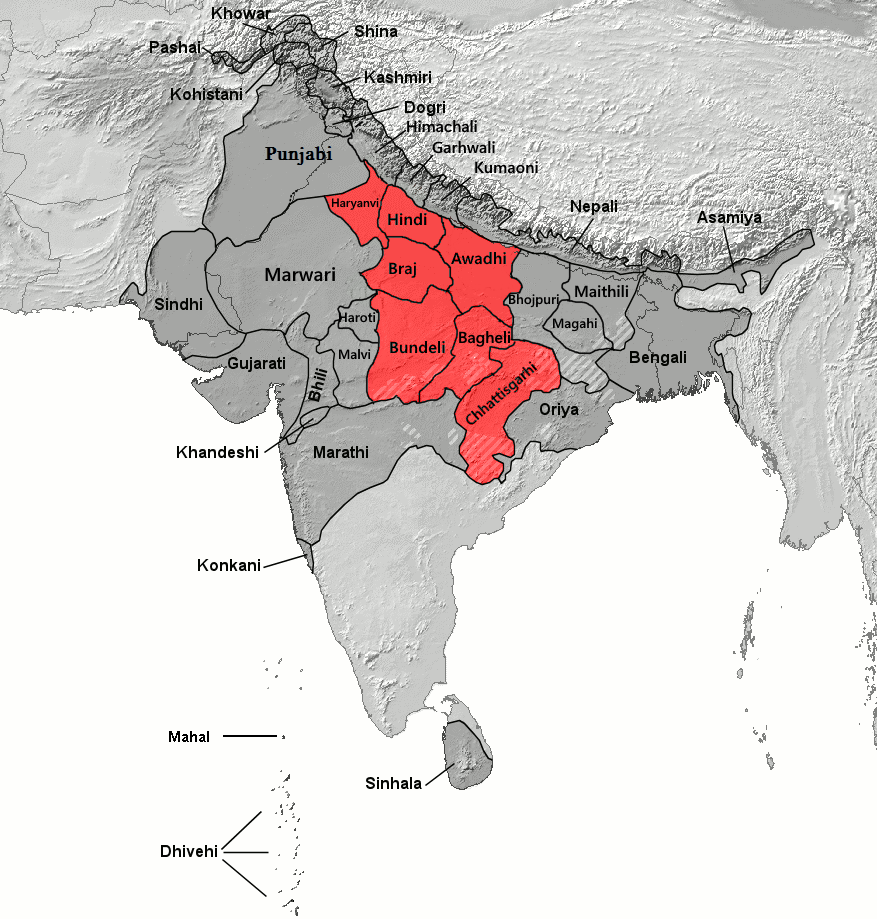

The Central Indo-Aryan languages or Hindi languages are a group of Indo-Aryan languages spoken across Northern and Central India. They historically form a dialect continuum that descends from the Middle Prakrits. Located in the Hindi Belt, the Central Zone includes the Dehlavi (Delhi) dialect (one of several called 'Khariboli') of the Hindustani language, the lingua franca of Northern India that is the basis of the Modern Standard Hindi and Standard Urdu literary standards. In regards to the Indo-Aryan language family, the coherence of this language group depends on the classification being used; here only Eastern and Western Hindi languages will be considered.

== Languages ==
If there can be considered a consensus within the dialectology of Hindi proper, it is that it can be split into two sets of dialects: Western and Eastern Hindi. Western Hindi evolved from the Apabhraṃśa form of Shauraseni Prakrit, Eastern Hindi from Ardhamagadhi Prakrit.

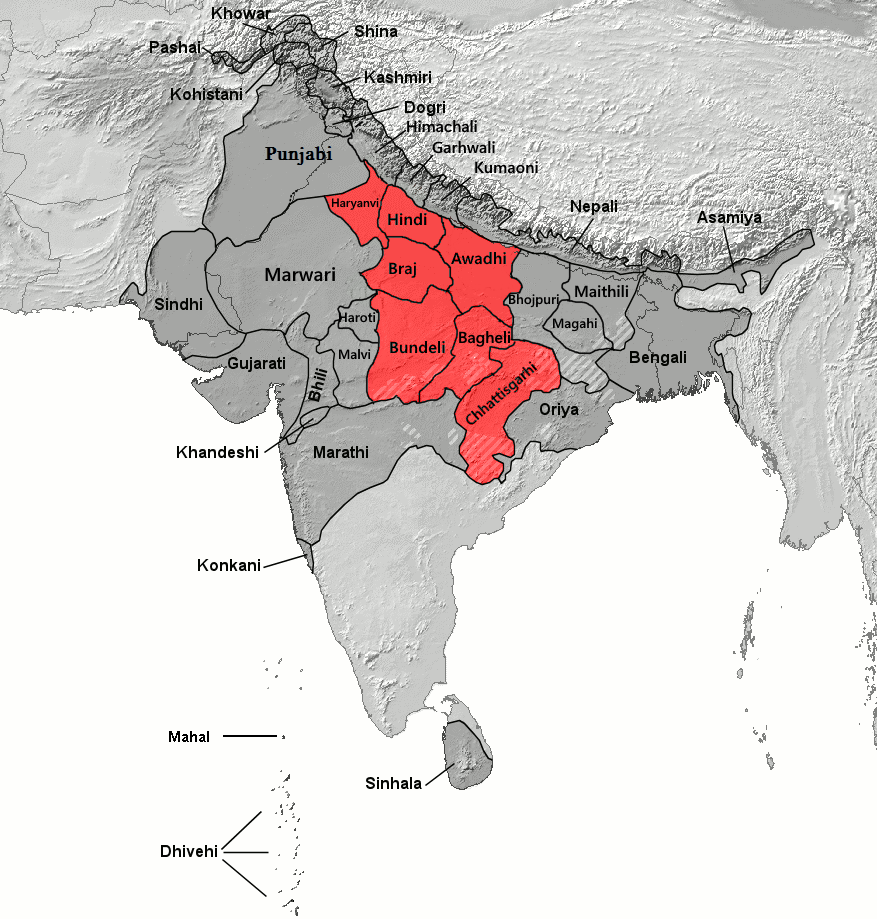
Western Hindi languages. Clockwise from the top: Haryanvi, Hindi, Bundeli, Braj. Eastern Hindi languages. From top to bottom: Awadhi, Bagheli and Chhattisgarhi.

- Western Hindi
  - Braj (1.6 m), spoken in western Uttar Pradesh and adjacent districts of Rajasthan and Haryana.
  - Bundeli (3 m), spoken in south-western Uttar Pradesh and west-central Madhya Pradesh.
  - Haryanvi (8 m), spoken in Chandigarh, Haryana, and as a minority in Punjab and Delhi.
  - Hindustani (including Hindi and Urdu (373 m)), spoken in western Uttar Pradesh, Delhi, and after partition in Pakistan.
    - Andaman Creole Hindi
    - Arunachali Hindi
    - Bihari Hindi (Note: Not to be confused with the Bihari languages, a group of Eastern Indo-Aryan languages.)
    - Bombay Hindi
    - Deccani
    - Dhakaiya Urdu
    - Haflong Hindi
    - Hinglish
    - Hyderabadi Urdu
    - Judeo-Urdu
    - Kauravi (Khariboli)
    - Rekhta
    - Urdish
  - Kannauji (9.5 m), spoken in west-central Uttar Pradesh.
- Eastern Hindi
  - Awadhi (4.35 m), spoken in north and north-central Uttar Pradesh as well as the Caribbean, Fiji, Mauritius and South Africa
    - Caribbean Hindustani (300 k) (mostly based on Bhojpuri but has major Awadhi influence)
    - Fiji Hindi (460 k) (mostly based on Awadhi with Bhojpuri influence)
    - Mauritian Bhojpuri (63 k) (mostly based on Bhojpuri but has major Awadhi influence)
  - Bagheli (8 m), spoken in north-central Madhya Pradesh and south-eastern Uttar Pradesh.
  - Chhattisgarhi (18 m), spoken in southeast Madhya Pradesh and northern and central Chhattisgarh.
    - Surgujia (1.7 m), spoken in Chhattisgarh
- Domari (280 k), spoken in the Middle East, Central Asia, and the Caucasus

Seb Seliyer (or at least its ancestor) appear to be Central Zone languages that migrated to the Middle East and Europe ca. 500–1000 CE.

Parya spoken in Gissar Valley in Tajikistan and Uzbekistan is considered a Central Zone language.

To Western Hindi Ethnologue adds Sansi (Sansiboli), Chamari (a spurious language), Bhaya, Gowari (not a separate language), and Ghera.

== Use in non-Hindi regions ==
- Andaman Creole Hindi is a trade language of the Andaman and Nicobar Islands.
- Arunachali Hindi is a trade language of Arunachal Pradesh.
- Bihari Hindi is a dialect of Hindustani greatly influenced by Bihari languages such as Bhojpuri, Magahi, Maithili, and Angika, spoken in urban areas in Bihar.
- Bombay Hindi ("Bombay Baat"), the dialect of the city of Mumbai (Bombay); it is based on Hindustani but heavily influenced by Marathi. Technically it is a pidgin, i.e. neither is it a native language of any people nor is it used in formal settings by the educated and upper social strata. However, it is often used in the films of Hindi cinema (Bollywood) because Mumbai is the base of the Bollywood film industry.
- Caribbean Hindustani is an Bihari-Eastern Hindi koiné lingua franca that developed among Indo-Caribbean people.
- Dhakaiya Urdu, a dialect of Urdu spoken in Dhaka, Bangladesh. It is based on Hindustani but heavily influenced by Bengali.
- Deccani, including Hyderabadi Urdu, and Bangalori Urdu, a dialect of Urdu spoken in the present areas of the erstwhile Hyderabad State, and the historical Deccan region. There is a small but distinct difference between Deccani and standard Hindustani, which is bigger the further south it is spoken.
- Fiji Hindi is an Eastern Hindi-Bihari koiné lingua franca that developed among Indo-Fijians.
- Haflong Hindi is a trade language of the areas adjacent to Haflong in Assam.
- Mauritian Bhojpuri is an Bihari-Eastern Hindi koiné lingua franca that developed among Indo-Mauritians.
- Domari is spoken in the Middle East, Central Asia, and the Caucasus.
- Parya spoken in Gissar Valley in Tajikistan and Uzbekistan.
- Seb Seliyer (or at least its ancestor) appear to be Central Zone languages that migrated to the Middle East and Europe ca. 500–1000 CE.
- To Western Hindi Ethnologue adds Sansi (Sansiboli), Chamari (a spurious language), Bhaya, Gowari (not a separate language), and Ghera which are spoken in Sindh and Rajasthan.

== Comparison ==
The Delhi Hindustani pronunciations [ɛː, ɔː] commonly have diphthongal realizations, ranging from [əɪ] to [ɑɪ] and from [əu] to [ɑu], respectively, in Eastern Hindi varieties and many non-standard Western Hindi varieties.

== Bibliography ==
- Shapiro, Michael C. (2003), "Hindi", in Cardona, George; Jain, Dhanesh (eds.), The Indo-Aryan Languages, Routledge, pp. 276–314, ISBN 978-0-415-77294-5
