= Bihari Hindi =

Variety of Hindi spoken in Bihar, India

Bihari Hindi is a variety of Hindustani, spoken in Bihar, particularly in the urban areas of Bihar. It is heavily influenced by many regional Bihari languages such as Magahi, Maithili and Bhojpuri.

== Phonology ==
=== Vowels ===
Hindi natively possesses a symmetrical ten-vowel system. Instead of [ɛː] and [ɔː], Bihari Hindi has diphthongs [əi/əe] and [əu/əo]. The vowels [ə], [ɪ], [ʊ] are always short in length, while the vowels [ɑː], [iː], [uː], [eː], [oː] are always considered long.

Vowels in Bihari Hindi
	Front						Central			Back					
	long			short			Central			short			long		
	IPA	Rom.	script	IPA	Rom.	script	IPA	Rom.	script	IPA	Rom.	script	IPA	Rom.	script
Close	iː	ī	ई	ɪ	i	इ				ʊ	u	उ	uː	ū	ऊ
Close-mid	eː	e	ए										oː	o	ओ
Open-mid							ə/ɐ/ʌ	a	अ						
Open													ɑː	ā	आ

Diphthongs
Front			Back		
IPA	Rom.	script	IPA	Rom.	script
əi/əe	ai	ऐ	əu/əo	au	औ

=== Consonants ===
Hindi has four classes of stops, one class of affricate, which is generally treated as a stop series, related nasals, fricatives and approximant.

			Labial	Dental/ Alveolar	Retroflex	Palatal	Velar	Glottal
Nasal			m ⟨म⟩	n ⟨न⟩	ɳ ⟨ण⟩	(ɲ) ⟨ञ⟩	ŋ ⟨ङ⟩	
Plosive/ Affricate	voiceless	unaspirated	p ⟨प⟩	t ⟨त⟩	ʈ ⟨ट⟩	tɕ ⟨च⟩	k ⟨क⟩	
Plosive/ Affricate	voiceless	aspirated	pʰ ⟨फ⟩	tʰ ⟨थ⟩	ʈʰ ⟨ठ⟩	tɕʰ ⟨छ⟩	kʰ ⟨ख⟩	
Plosive/ Affricate	voiced	unaspirated	b ⟨ब⟩	d ⟨द⟩	ɖ ⟨ड⟩	dʑ ⟨ज⟩	ɡ ⟨ग⟩	
Plosive/ Affricate	voiced	aspirated	bʱ ⟨भ⟩	dʱ ⟨ध⟩	ɖʱ ⟨ढ⟩	dʑʱ ⟨झ⟩	ɡʱ ⟨घ⟩	
Fricative	voiceless			s ⟨स⟩	(ʂ) ⟨ष⟩	(ɕ) ⟨श⟩		-(h)⟨ः⟩
Fricative	voiced							ɦ ⟨ह⟩
Rhotic	unaspirated			ɾ~r ⟨र⟩	(ɽ) ⟨ड़⟩			
Rhotic	aspirated				(ɽʱ) ⟨ढ़⟩			
Lateral				l ⟨ल⟩				
Approximant			(ʋ~w) ⟨व⟩			(j) ⟨य⟩		

== Morphology ==
=== Nouns ===
Standard Hindi distinguishes two genders (masculine and feminine), two noun types (count and non-count), two numbers (singular and plural), and three cases (direct, oblique, and vocative). But in Bihari Hindi, the direct case is most commonly used. Other cases are dormant. The inflectional plural is also not used, the periphrastic plural is used. However, a weak inflected plural is used in Bihari Hindi, borrowed from eastern Hindi and Bhojpuri (-an), though it is declined here only for animates. Nouns are divided into two classes- marked and unmarked, which have no differences except that the marked form is used for declinable adjectives. There is a peculiar long form in Bihari Hindi, for most tadbhava and marked nouns, a feature also prevalent in Maithili, Magahi and Bhojpuri. This form denotes several meanings-

1. It denotes diminutive or often low honour meaning.
2. It also denotes definite nature of the noun.
3. For proper nouns, apart from the diminutive meaning, it also signifies familiarity, especially for personal names.

Weak plurals can also be formed from these long form of the nouns.

Gender system is usually the same as Standard Hindi, but differs in that only animates and real gender is marked in Bihari Hindi, all unmarked inanimates are treated masculine. Therefore, the gender system can be defined as- masculine-neuter and feminine.

The table below displays the suffix paradigms. -Ø denotes that no suffix is added to the noun stem.

		Singular	Singular Long Form	Weak Plural	Plural
Masculine-neuter	Marked	-ā	-avā	-an/avan	-ā sab
Masculine-neuter	Unmarked	-Ø	-ā (yā if i/ī-ending, vā if ∅/a/ā-ending)	-an (-iyan if i/ī-ending, van if ∅/a/ā-ending)	-Ø sab
Feminine	Marked	-ī/i -iyā	iyā aiyā	-in/iyan -iyan/aiyan	-ī/i sab -iyā sab
Feminine	Unmarked	-Ø	-ā (yā if i/ī-ending, iyā if ∅/a/ā-ending)	-an -iyan	-Ø sab

Plural is not mandatory, it can be dropped when inanimate or indefinite. The next table of noun declensions, shows the above suffix paradigms in action. Words: laṛkā ('boy'), kū̃ā ('well'), seb ('apple'), balid ('father'), cākū (chūrī is more common, but cākū is a more apt example) ('penknife'), admī ('man'), mitr ('friend'), laṛkī ('girl'), ciṛiyā ('finch'), kitāb ('book'), bhāsā ('language'), and aurat ('woman').

		Singular	Singular Long Form	Weak Plural	Plural
Masculine-neuter	Marked	laṛkā kuā̃	larkavā kuãvā	laṛkan (inanimate) (non-tadbhava)	laṛkā sab kuā̃ sab
Masculine-neuter	Unmarked	seb cākū admī mitr balid	sebvā→sebbā cakuā admiyā (tatsama) (non-tadbhava)	(inanimate) (inanimate) ādmiyan (tatsama) (non-tadbhava)	seb (sab) cāqū sab ādmī sab mitr sab balid sab
Masculine-neuter	Unmarked, Feminine in Standard Hindi	kitāb bhāsā	kitabvā→kitabba bhasvā	(inanimate) (inanimate and tatsama)	kitāb sab bhāsā sab
Feminine	Marked	laṛkī ciṛiyā	laṛkiyā ciṛaiyā	laṛkin/laṛkiyan (inanimate)	laṛkī sab ciṛiyā sab
Feminine	Unmarked	aurat	auratiyā	auratan/ auratiyan	aurat sab

Sometimes, weak plural is also combined with plural marker sab, such as laṛkan sab, laṛkiyan sab, and so on. Also long form can also be combined with plural marker sab, such as laṛkavā sab, laṛkiyā sab.

Notes for noun declension:

- ^1A small number of marked masculines like kuā̃ display nasalization of all terminations.
- ^2Some masculines ending in ā fall in the unmarked category. i.e. bālid (valid in Stabdard Hindi) "father", cacā (cācā in Standard Hindi) "uncle", rājā "king".
- ^3Unmarked nouns ending in ū and ī generally shorten this to u and i before the plural termination(s), with the latter also inserting the semivowel y.
- ^4Many feminine Sanskrit loanwords such as bhāsā (bhāṣā in tatsama form) ('language') and mātā (mother) end in ā, therefore the ā is not a reliable indicator of noun gender.
- The iyā ending is also not a reliable indicator of gender or noun type. Some words such as pahiyā ('wheel') and Persian takiā ('pillow') are masculine marked: pahiyan ('wheels'), takiyan ('pillows'). Feminine loanwords such as Arabic duniā ('world') and Sanskrit kiriyā (krīyā in tatsama form) ('action') use feminine unmarked.
- Perso-Arabic loans ending in final unpronounced h are handled as masculine marked nouns. Hence bacca(h) → baccā.

=== Adjectives ===
Adjectives may be divided into declinable, and indeclinable categories. Declinables of Standard Hindi are marked, through termination, for the gender of the nouns they qualify, and in Bihari Hindi, indeclinable adjectives are also declined, for forming long forms, thus they can be properly said unmarked. Instead of number, adjectives are qualified for honour, a characteristic feature of Bihari languages. For forming long forms, suffix -kā and -kī is used for masculine-neuter and feminine respectively.

Plurals can be made of weak plurals, but not as an adjective. They are rather used as adverbs.

The set of declinable adjective terminations is similar but greatly simplified in comparison to that of noun terminations —

			Non-honorofic	Long Form	Honorific
Marked	I	Masc.-Neu.	-ā	-kā	-e
Marked	I	Fem.	-ī	-kī	-ī
Marked	II	Masc.-Neu.	-yā	-yakā/ikkā	-ye
Marked	II	Fem.	-yā	-yakkī	-yā
Marked	III	Masc.-Neu.	-yā̃	-ẽka	-yẽ
Marked	III	Fem.	-yī̃	-ẽkī	-yī̃
Unmarked		Masc.-Neu.	-Ø	-kā/kkā	-Ø
Unmarked		Fem.	-Ø	-kī	-Ø

Indeclinable adjectives are completely invariable, and can end in either consonants or vowels (including ā and ī ). A number of declinables display nasalisation of all terminations.

- Examples of marked (type-1) adjectives: baṛā "big", choṭā "small", moṭā "fat", acchā "good", burā "bad", kālā "black", ṭhaṇḍā "cold".
- Examples of marked (type-2) adjectives: baṛhiyā "great/awesome", ghatiyā "of bad quality or nature", cūtiyā "idiot"/ "asshole".
- Examples of marked (type-3) adjectives: dāyā̃ "right (direction)", bāyā̃ "left (direction)"
- Examples of unmarked adjectives: kharāb "bad", sāph "clean", bhārī "heavy", murdā "dead", sundar "beautiful", pāgal "crazy/mad", lāl "red".

== Bibliography ==
- Schmidt, Hans (2003), "Temathesis in Rotuman" (PDF), in John Lynch (ed.), Issues in Austronesian Historical Phonology, Pacific Linguistics Research School of Pacific and Asian Studies, pp. 175–207, ISBN 978-0-85883-503-0
- Shapiro, Michael C. (2003). "Hindi". In Cardona, George; Jain, Dhanesh (eds.). The Indo-Aryan Languages. Routledge. pp. 250–285. ISBN 978-0-415-77294-5.
- Snell, Rupert; Weightman, Simon (1989). Teach Yourself Hindi (2003 ed.). McGraw-Hill. ISBN 978-0-07-142012-9.
