= Hindustani orthography =

Writing systems of the Hindustani language

Hindustani (standardized Hindi and standardized Urdu) has been written in several different scripts. Most Hindi texts are written in the Devanagari script, which is derived from the Brahmi script of the ancient India. Most Urdu texts are written in the Urdu alphabet, which comes from the Persian alphabet. Hindustani has been written in both scripts. In recent years, the Latin script has been used in these languages for technological or internationalization reasons. Historically, Kaithi and Gurmukhi (both of which are Brahmic scripts) has also been used.

== Devanagari script ==
The Devanagari script is an abugida, as written consonants have an inherent vowel, which in Standard Hindi is a schwa. In certain contexts, such as at the end of words, there is no vowel, a phenomenon called the schwa deletion (or schwa syncope). Other vowels are written with a diacritic on the consonant letter. Devanagari is written from left to right, with a top-bar connecting the letters together.

=== Vowels ===
अ	आ	इ	ई	उ	ऊ	ऋ	ए	ऐ	ओ	औ	अं	अः	ऍ	ऑ
ə / ɐ	aː	ɪ	iː	ʊ	uː	r̩	eː	ɛː	oː	ɔː	əm / əɳ / əŋ / əɲ / ən	əh	æ(ː)	ɒ(ː)

=== Consonants ===
क	ख	ग	घ	ङ
k	kʰ	ɡ	ɡʱ	ŋ
च	छ	ज	झ	ञ
t͡ʃ	t͡ʃʰ	d͡ʒ	d͡ʒʱ	ɲ
ट	ठ	ड	ढ	ण
ʈ	ʈʰ	ɖ	ɖʱ	ɳ
त	थ	द	ध	न
t̪	t̪ʰ	d̪	d̪ʱ	n
प	फ	ब	भ	म
p	pʰ	b	bʱ	m
य	र	ल	व	
j	ɾ	l	ʋ / w	
श	ष	स	ह	
ʃ	ʂ	s	ɦ	

=== Modified consonants for non-native phonemes ===
क़	ख़	ग़	ज़	झ़	ड़	ढ़	फ़
q	x	ɣ	z	ʒ	ɽ	ɽʱ	f

Irregular ligatures:

- क्ष (क and ष) kṣ is pronounced /kʂ/ (or colloquially as /kʃ/) (wiktionary:क्ष) (Irregular shape, regular pronunciation)
- त्र (त and र) tr is pronounced /t̪ɾ/ (wiktionary:त्र) (Irregular shape, regular pronunciation)
- ज्ञ (ज and ञ) jñ is pronounced /ɡj/ (or rarely as /d͡ʒɲ/) (wiktionary:ज्ञ) (Irregular shape and pronunciation)
- श्र (श and र) tr is pronounced /ʃɾ/ (wiktionary:श्र) (Irregular shape, regular pronunciation)

=== Schwa deletion ===
The schwa (अ or 'ə', sometimes written 'a') implicit in each consonant of the Devanagari script is "obligatorily deleted" in Hindi (as well as in Marathi) at the end of words and in certain other contexts. This phenomenon has been termed the "schwa syncope rule" or the "schwa deletion rule" of Hindi. One formalization of this rule has been summarized as ə -> ø | VC_CV. In other words, when a vowel-preceded consonant is followed by a vowel-succeeded consonant, the schwa inherent in the first consonant is deleted. However, this formalization is inexact and incomplete (i.e. sometimes deletes a schwa when it shouldn't or, at other times, fails to delete it when it should), and can yield errors. Schwa deletion is computationally important because it is essential to building text-to-speech software for Hindi.

As a result of schwa syncope, the correct Hindi pronunciation of many words differs from that expected from a literal rendering of Devanagari. For instance, राम is Rām (incorrect: Rāma), रचना is Rachnā (incorrect: Rachanā), वेद is Vēd (incorrect: Vēda) and नमकीन is Namkīn (incorrect Namakīna).

== Perso-Arabic script ==
The Urdu alphabet is based on the Persian alphabet, which is an Arabic alphabet. Urdu is written from right to left, and most letters link together. This leads to variations in the form of a letter depending on its position in a word. Most vowels are omitted in generic texts, although they may be written for disambiguation or for pedagogical purposes. Urdu is primarily written in a calligraphic style of the script called Nasta'liq.

Letter	Nasta‘liq	Name of letter	Transcription	IPA
ا	ا	alif	a, i, u	/ə/, /ɪ/, /ʊ/
آ	آ	alif madda	ā	/ɑː/
ب	ب	be	b	/b/
پ	پ	pe	p	/p/
ت	ت	te	t	/t̪/
ٹ	ٹ	ṭe	ṭ	/ʈ/
ث	ث	se	s	/s/
ج	ج	jīm	j	/d͡ʒ/
چ	چ	che	ch	/t͡ʃ/
ح	ح	baṛī he	h	/h/
خ	خ	khe	kh	/x/
د	د	dāl	d	/d̪/
ڈ	ڈ	ḍāl	ḍ	/ɖ/
ذ	ذ	zāl	dh	/z/
ر	ر	re	r	/r/
ڑ	ڑ	ṛe	ṛ	/ɽ/
ز	ز	ze	z	/z/
ژ	ژ	zhe	zh	/ʒ/
س	س	sīn	s	/s/
ش	ش	shīn	sh	/ʃ/
ص	ص	su'ād	ṣ	/s/
ض	ض	zu'ād	z̤	/z/
ط	ط	to'e	t	/t/
ظ	ظ	zo'e	ẓ	/z/
ع	ع	‘ain	'	/ʔ/
غ	غ	ghain	gh	/ɣ/
ف	ف	fe	f	/f/
ق	ق	qāf	q	/q/
ک	ک	kāf	k	/k/
گ	گ	gāf	g	/ɡ/
ل	ل	lām	l	/l/
م	م	mīm	m	/m/
ن	ن	nūn	n	/n/
ں	ں	nūn ghunna	n	/~/
و	و	vā'o	w, v, o, au or ū	/w/, /ʋ/, /oː/, /ɔ/ or /uː/
ہ	ہ	chhoṭī he	h	/h/
ھ	ھ	do chashmī he	h	/ʰ/
ء	ئ, ۓ, ؤ	hamza	'	/ʔ/
ی	ی	ye	y, i	/j/ or /iː/
ے	ے	barī ye	ai or e	/ɛː/, or /eː/

== Latin script ==
The Latin script has been used to write Hindustani for technological or internationalization reasons. Roman Hindi and Roman Urdu uses the basic Latin alphabet. It is most commonly used by young native speakers for technological applications, such as chat, emails and SMS.

ITRANS, ISCII, IAST (and the near-identical ISO 15919), and Harvard-Kyoto romanization schemes have been employed primarily for usage by non-native speakers who are more familiar with the Latin alphabet.

== Transliteration ==
Transliteration between the three scripts can be complicated, particularly when transliterating between Devanagari and Perso-Arabic scripts. One obstacle to this is that multiple different letters in one script often all correspond to the same letter in the other script. So, simple substitution often does not produce the correct spellings.

=== Urdu letters with similar sounds ===
Some sets of Urdu letters have matching sounds.

- 4 letters ز ذ ض ظ are all ≈ Z
- 3 letters س ص ث are all ≈ S
- 2 letters ت ط are both ≈ T (a third letter ٹ is also often shown as English T, but is different to the other two Urdu letters, see #retroflex consonants below.)
- 2 letters ہ ح are both ≈ H but are sometimes regarded as distinct.

== Braille script ==
Three braille alphabets are used: Hindi and Urdu braille in India, based on Bharati braille conventions, and Urdu Braille in Pakistan, based on Persian Braille conventions. Hindi Braille is an alphabet with a not written in some environments, while for Urdu Braille in Pakistan, it seems that vowels may be optional as they are in print.

== See also ==
- Uddin and Begum Hindustani Romanisation
- Hindi–Urdu transliteration
- Hindustani etymology
- Hindustani phonology
- Hindustani grammar
- Nuqta
