= George Linley =

British composer (1797–1865)

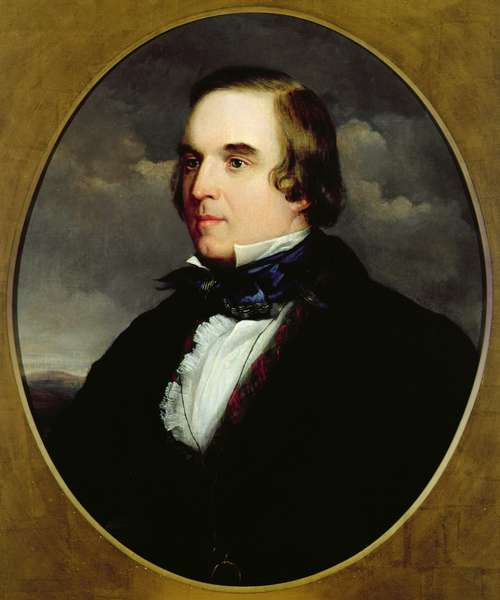
- George Linley by Charles Henry Schwanfelder
- Born: 27 December 1797; Rothwell, West Yorkshire
- Died: 10 September 1865 (aged 67); London
- Spouse: Violet Gilchrist
- Writing career
- Years active: 1830–1865
- Genres: Poetry, Ballads, Satire
- Notable work: "God Bless the Prince of Wales"

George Linley (27 December 1797 – 10 September 1865), was an English verse-writer and musical composer, who was born in Leeds. He contributed verses to the local newspapers and published some pamphlets, before leaving his native city in early life. After a period of military service, he lived at first in Edinburgh but finally settled in London, where he gained a reputation as a writer and composer of songs and ballads. He is perhaps best known for writing the English lyrics to the song, "God Bless the Prince of Wales".

== Biography ==
=== Early life ===
Linley was born on 27 December 1797 and baptised on 7 February 1798 at Leeds Parish Church, the younger son of James Linley, a tinplate worker, and his wife Ann. His early education was under Joshua Eastburn, a quaker, at Leeds Grammar School. At the age of 16, he joined the 3rd West Yorkshire Militia as an ensign, serving in Doncaster and Dublin.

Linley started his writing career in Leeds, penning lampooning verses about local dignitaries. This antagonised the victims such that Linley reportedly "bolted to London in a huff". He later moved to Edinburgh, where he married and was briefly a partner in a mercantile firm in Leith.

=== Writing career in London ===
Linley eventually settled in London, where he wrote and composed several hundred songs between 1830 and 1865. Among his most fashionable and popular ballads, composed between 1830 and 1847, were Thou art gone from my gaze, Song of the roving gipsey, Constance; and later, between 1852 and 1862, with a stronger vein of melody, Minnie, Old friends at home, and the Robert Burns poem, The Jolly Beggars. Linley also wrote the English words to the song "God Bless the Prince of Wales" (originally performed in Welsh), which was completed and performed in 1863. He was well acquainted with William Sterndale Bennett, Felix Mendelssohn and Jenny Lind.

Linley's flowing style of composition was little suited to the stage, and his musical pieces produced at London theaters had small measure of success. The musical play, Franceses Doria, for which he wrote the songs and the music, was produced at the Princess's Theatre, London, on 3 March 1849, and published in the same year. The Toymakers, an operetta, was brought out at Covent Garden Theatre by the English Opera Company on 19 November 1861. Law versus Love, comedietta in one act, by him, was performed at the Princess's Theatre on 6 December 1862.

Linley was also the author of some farces, and of satirical poems. His Musical Cynics of London, a Satire; Sketch the First, London, 1862, a savage onslaught upon music critic Henry Fothergill Chorley proved more fatal to the reputation of the author than to that of the victim. It contained smart and clever passages, and, like the Modern Hudibras, 1864, was widely read, and passed through two editions. The Showman, a work upon which Linley was engaged towards the end of his life, was not published.

=== Marriage and children ===
On 4 April 1824, Linley married Violet Gilchrist in Edinburgh. She was the youngest daughter of the linguist, John Borthwick Gilchrist. They had 6 children (3 sons and 3 daughters) but two of the daughters died in childhood. One of the sons, also named George (1834–1869), followed in his father's footsteps as a poet.

=== Death ===
Linley died, after a lingering illness, at Kensington, London, on 10 September 1865, and was buried at Kensal Green Cemetery 5 days later. One obituary stated, "The absence of the happy face and wit of George Linley from many a gathering of musical and literary men in London will be long felt as a loss not easily supplied."

The portrait of George Linley by Charles Henry Schwanfelder is held by Leeds Museums and Galleries.
