= Uddin and Begum Hindustani Romanisation =

The Uddin and Begum Hindustani Romanisation scheme is an international standard for romanising (transliterating into the Latin alphabet) Urdu and Hindi (sometimes jointly referred to as the Hindustani language, particularly in the era of British India). Syed Fasih Uddin and Quader Unissa Begum presented the scheme in 1992, at the First International Urdu Conference in Chicago.

Uddin and Begum based their scheme on the work that John Borthwick Gilchrist and others began at Fort William College in Calcutta more than a century earlier. Gilchrist's romanisation system became the de facto standard for romanised Hindustani during the late 19th century.

Uddin and Begum attempted to improve on, and modernize, Gilchrist's system in a number of ways. For example, in the Uddin and Begum scheme, Urdu and Hindi characters correspond one-to-one. Also, diacritics indicate vowel phonics, whereas in the Gilchrist system the reader must infer vowel pronunciation from context. To facilitate Urdu and Hindustani romanisation in a much wider range of computer software, Uddin and Begum limited their character set to the common ASCII standard.

== Romanisation scheme ==
MIS Urdu - Hindustani Language Letters of Alphabet
	Lower Case Characters	Upper Case Characters	Character Name
1	a a'	A A'	Alif
2	b	B	Be
3	c_h	C_H	C_Hi'm
4	d	D	Dal
5	d^	D^	D^a'l
6	e	E	Ye
7	f	F	Fe
8	g	G	Ga'f
9	g_h	G_H	G_Hain
10	h	H	He
11	i i'	I I'	Yi
12	j j'	J J'	Ji'm
13	k	K	Ka'f
14	k_h	K_H	K_Hae
15	l	L	La'm
16	m	M	Mi'm
17	n (n)	N (N)	Nu'n
18	o	O	Ow
19	p	P	Pe
20	q	Q	Qha'f
21	r	R	Re
22	r^	R^	R^ae
23	s	S	Se
24	s_h	S_H	S_Hin
25	t	T	TeAlif
26	t^	T	T^e
27	u u'	U U'	Ou
28	w	W	Wa'o
29	y	Y	Ya
30	z	Z	Ze

Notes:

- ^ is the hard (retroflex) sound. (representing with the caret)
- _h _H is the guttural sound. (representing with the underscore)
- ’ is the long vowel sound. (representing with the apostrophe)
- (n) (N) is the nasal sound of Nu'n, when if follows a long vowel and when sometimes used at the end of a word. (representing by enclosing it in parentheses)
- ~ Gemination, which is the interjunction of two vowels, with the first vowel 'casting a shadow' on the second vowel.

== Vowels ==
=== Short vowels ===
a 		A

- Sounds like English u in but, shut.
  - In Urdu: ab, adab, agar, ahmaq, kam.

i		I

- Sounds like English i in bit, hit.
  - In Urdu: kari, giri, ajnabi, bha'i.

u		U

- Sounds like English u in pull, bull.
  - In Urdu: Urdu, uda's, umda, ungli.

Note: In traditional Urdu script these vowels sounds are not represented by any letters of alphabet. They are often omitted or sometimes represented by signs which are added to consonants and are termed "Eara'bs". "Eara'bs" representing short vowels are "zabar", "zaer" and "paesh".

=== Long vowels ===
a'		A'

- Sounds like English "a" in far, father.
  - In Urdu: a'ba'di, a'g, a'fat, a'm, ka'm.

i'		I'

- Sounds like English "ea" in heat, seat.
  - In Urdu: i'nt^.

u'		U'

- Sounds like English "oo" in tool, soon.
  - In Urdu: bu'nd, bhu'k, ju'ta, jhu't^.

=== Neutral vowels ===
Urdu has three neutral vowels, which are without long or short form.

e		E

- Sounds like English "ay" in hay, lay.
  - In Urdu: la'e, ga'e, c_ha'e, pic_he, pic_hhle.

o		O

- Sounds like English "o" in old, own.
  - In Urdu: os, ko, or^hna, roz, afsosna'k.

y		Y

- Sounds like English "y" in yard, young.
  - In Urdu: ya'r, ya'd, yaqin ha~ey.

=== Compound vowels ===
A~i		A~I

- In Urdu: a~isa, a~ina

A~u		A~U

- In Urdu: a~urat

A~y		A~Y

- In Urdu: a~ya, a~yanda

=== Double vowels ===
Inter-junction of two vowels, with the first vowel casting a shadow on the second vowel. The two vowels are separated by a ~ Tilde. The following examples illustrates the case of double vowels. In traditional notations this is referred as HUMZA.

Kaha~e         A'~i’         La'~e         La'~o         Li’~ye
Ga~e           Ha~ey         Ga~i’         A'~u(n)       Kiji~ye

=== Nasal Nu'n ===
Is the nasal sound of Nu'n, when it follows a long vowel and when sometimes used at the end of a word. (representing by enclosing in parentheses). The following examples illustrate the case of nasal Nu'n. In traditional notations this is referred as Nu'n-e-g_huna.

Ma(n)        Ha(n)        De(n)        Me(n)
Ha,e(n)      Tihe(n)	  Hu(n)

== Consonants ==
=== Sounds from Sanskrit-derived words ===
Sanskrit-based words in Urdu have the following typical vernacular compound sounds:

bh   c_hh   dh   d^h   gh   jh   kh   ph   r^h   th   t^h

=== Sounds from Persian-derived words ===
Persian-based words in Urdu have the following typical vernacular sounds:

C_Hi'm         Ga'f         Pe

=== Sounds from Arabic-derived words ===
Arabic-derived words in Urdu that have the following typical vernacular sounds:

Ain     G/Hain     Fe     Qha'f     Toe     Zoe     Swa'd     Zwa'd     Se     Ha~e

== See also ==
- Hindustani (Hindi-Urdu) word etymology
- Hindustani grammar
- Hindustani orthography
- Devanāgarī script
- Nasta'liq script
- Roman Urdu
- Urdu alphabet
