= Punjabi Braille =

Braille alphabet used in India for Punjabi

Punjabi Braille Gurmukhi Braille
- Script type: Alphabet
- Print basis: Gurmukhi alphabet
- Languages: Punjabi language

Related scripts
- Parent systems: Braille: English Braille; Bharati Braille; Punjabi Braille
- Indic

Punjabi Braille is the braille alphabet used in India for Punjabi. It is one of the Bharati braille alphabets, and largely conforms to the letter values of the other Bharati alphabets.

== Alphabet ==
The alphabet is as follows: Vowel letters are used rather than diacritics, and they occur after consonants in their spoken order. For orthographic conventions, see Bharati Braille.

Gurmukhi	ਅ	ਆ	ਇ	ਈ	ਉ	ਊ	ਏ	ਐ	ਓ	ਔ
ISO	a	ā	i	ī	u	ū	ē	e	ō	o
Braille (Image)	⠁ (braille pattern dots-1)	⠜ (braille pattern dots-345)	⠊ (braille pattern dots-24)	⠔ (braille pattern dots-35)	⠥ (braille pattern dots-136)	⠳ (braille pattern dots-1256)	⠑ (braille pattern dots-15)	⠌ (braille pattern dots-34)	⠕ (braille pattern dots-135)	⠪ (braille pattern dots-246)
Braille (Inline)	⠁	⠜	⠊	⠔	⠥	⠳	⠑	⠌	⠕	⠪

Gurmukhi	ਕ	ਖ	ਗ	ਘ	ਙ
ISO	k	kh	g	gh	ṅ
Braille (Image)	⠅ (braille pattern dots-13)	⠨ (braille pattern dots-46)	⠛ (braille pattern dots-1245)	⠣ (braille pattern dots-126)	⠬ (braille pattern dots-346)
Braille (Inline)	⠅	⠨	⠛	⠣	⠬

Gurmukhi	ਚ	ਛ	ਜ	ਝ	ਞ
ISO	c	ch	j	jh	ñ
Braille (Image)	⠉ (braille pattern dots-14)	⠡ (braille pattern dots-16)	⠚ (braille pattern dots-245)	⠴ (braille pattern dots-356)	⠒ (braille pattern dots-25)
Braille (Inline)	⠉	⠡	⠚	⠴	⠒

Gurmukhi	ਟ	ਠ	ਡ	ਢ	ਣ
ISO	ṭ	ṭh	ḍ	ḍh	ṇ
Braille (Image)	⠾ (braille pattern dots-23456)	⠺ (braille pattern dots-2456)	⠫ (braille pattern dots-1246)	⠿ (braille pattern dots-123456)	⠼ (braille pattern dots-3456)
Braille (Inline)	⠾	⠺	⠫	⠿	⠼

Gurmukhi	ਤ	ਥ	ਦ	ਧ	ਨ
ISO	t	th	d	dh	n
Braille (Image)	⠞ (braille pattern dots-2345)	⠹ (braille pattern dots-1456)	⠙ (braille pattern dots-145)	⠮ (braille pattern dots-2346)	⠝ (braille pattern dots-1345)
Braille (Inline)	⠞	⠹	⠙	⠮	⠝

Gurmukhi	ਪ	ਫ	ਬ	ਭ	ਮ
ISO	p	ph	b	bh	m
Braille (Image)	⠏ (braille pattern dots-1234)	⠖ (braille pattern dots-235)	⠃ (braille pattern dots-12)	⠘ (braille pattern dots-45)	⠍ (braille pattern dots-134)
Braille (Inline)	⠏	⠖	⠃	⠘	⠍

Gurmukhi	ਯ	ਰ	ਲ	ਵ
ISO	y	r	l	v
Braille (Image)	⠽ (braille pattern dots-13456)	⠗ (braille pattern dots-1235)	⠇ (braille pattern dots-123)	⠧ (braille pattern dots-1236)
Braille (Inline)	⠽	⠗	⠇	⠧

Gurmukhi	ਸ	ਹ	ੜ
ISO	s	h	ṛ
Braille (Image)	⠎ (braille pattern dots-234)	⠓ (braille pattern dots-125)	⠻ (braille pattern dots-12456)
Braille (inline)	⠎	⠓	⠻

=== Pointing ===
The Bharati point, ⠐, is only used to derive one consonant, ਗ਼ ġa /ɣə/, from the base consonant letter ਗ ga /ɡə/. This system also operates in Hindi Braille and Indian Urdu Braille, but the Punjabi Braille alphabet is closer to Indian Urdu, as all other consonants that are pointed in print, such as ਖ਼ xa, are rendered with dedicated letters in braille based on international values. The six pointed letters in the Gurmukhi script have the following equivalents in braille:

Gurmukhi	ਖ਼	ਗ਼	ਜ਼	ਫ਼	ਲ਼	ਸ਼
ISO	x	ġ	z	f	ḷ	ś
Braille (Image)	⠭ (braille pattern dots-1346)	⠐ (braille pattern dots-5) ⠛ (braille pattern dots-1245)	⠵ (braille pattern dots-1356)	⠋ (braille pattern dots-124)	⠸ (braille pattern dots-456)	⠩ (braille pattern dots-146)
Braille (Inline)	⠭	⠐⠛	⠵	⠋	⠸	⠩

=== Codas ===
Points are used for syllable codas.

Gurmukhi	ਕ੍	ਕਂ	ਕਃ	ਕਁ
Diacritics	Halant	Anusvara	Visarga	Candrabindu
Braille (Image)	⠈ (braille pattern dots-4)	⠰ (braille pattern dots-56)	⠠ (braille pattern dots-6)	⠄ (braille pattern dots-3)
Braille (Inline)	⠈	⠰	⠠	⠄

== Punctuation ==
See Bharati Braille#Punctuation.
