= Open central unrounded vowel =

Vowel sound often represented by ⟨ä⟩ in IPA

ä
- IPA number: 304 415

Audio sample
- source · help

Encoding
- Entity (decimal): &#228;
- Unicode (hex): U+00E4
- X-SAMPA: a_"

IPA: Vowels

	Front	Central	Back
Close	i y	ɨ ʉ	ɯ u
Near-close	ɪ ʏ		ʊ
Close-mid	e ø	ɘ ɵ	ɤ o
Mid	e̞ ø̞	ə	ɤ̞ o̞
Open-mid	ɛ œ	ɜ ɞ	ʌ ɔ
Near-open	æ	ɐ
Open	a ɶ	ä	ɑ ɒ

- IPA help
- audio
- full chart
- template

Legend: unrounded • rounded

The open central unrounded vowel, or low central unrounded vowel, is a type of vowel sound, used in several spoken languages. While the International Phonetic Alphabet officially has no dedicated letter for this sound between front [a] and back [ɑ], it is normally written ⟨a⟩. If precision is required, it can be specified by using diacritics, typically centralized ⟨ä⟩.

It is usual to use plain ⟨a⟩ for an open central vowel and, if needed, ⟨æ⟩ for an open front vowel. Ad hoc barred ⟨𝽁⟩ has also been used. Sinologists may use the letter ⟨ᴀ⟩ (small capital A). The IPA has repeatedly voted against officially adopting this symbol: in 1976, 1989, and 2012.

== Features ==
- Its vowel height is open, also known as low, which means the tongue is positioned far from the roof of the mouth – that is, low in the mouth.
- Its vowel backness is central, which means the tongue is positioned halfway between a front vowel and a back vowel. This often subsumes open (low) front vowels, because the tongue does not have as much flexibility in positioning as it does for the close (high) vowels; the difference between an open front vowel and an open back vowel is equal to the difference between a close front and a close central vowel, or a close central and a close back vowel.
- It is unrounded, which means that the lips are not rounded.

== Occurrence ==
Most languages have some form of an unrounded open vowel. Because the IPA uses ⟨a⟩ for both front and central unrounded open vowels, it is not always clear whether a particular language uses the former or the latter. However, there may not actually be a difference. (See Vowel § Acoustics.)

Language		Word	IPA	Meaning	Notes
Burmese		မာ / ma	[mä]	'hard'	Oral allophone of /a/ in open syllables; realized as near-open [ɐ] in other environments.
Catalan		sac	[ˈs̺äk]	'bag'	General pronunciation of stressed /a/, which might be more back ([ɑ]) in some dialects. Subject to assimilation (to both front or back allophones). In most Eastern dialects it alternates with the reduced pronunciation [ə] or [ɐ]. See Catalan phonology
Chinese	Mandarin	塌 / tā	[tʰä˥]	'collapse'	See Standard Chinese phonology
Czech		prach	[präx]	'dust'	See Czech phonology
Danish	Standard	barn	[ˈpɑ̈ːˀn]	'child'	Typically transcribed in IPA with ⟨ɑː⟩. See Danish phonology
Dutch		zaal	[zäːɫ]	'hall'	Ranges from front to central; in non-standard accents it may be back. See Dutch phonology
English	Australian	bra	[bɹɐ̞ː]	'bra'	Realization of /ɐ/ and /ɐː/ (corresponding to /ʌ/ and /ɑː/ respectively in other dialects). Typically transcribed in IPA with ⟨ɐː⟩. See Australian English phonology
English	East Anglian	bra	[bɹɐ̞ː]	'bra'	Used mostly by middle-class speakers; can be front [aː] instead.
English	General American	bra	[bɹɐ̞ː]	'bra'	In the Midwest. Can be back [ɑː] instead.
English	New Zealand	bra	[bɹɐ̞ː]	'bra'	One realization of /a/ and /aː/ (corresponding to /ʌ/ and /ɑː/ respectively in other dialects). Can be more front [a̠ː] and/or higher [ɐ̟ː ~ ɐː] instead. It may be transcribed in IPA with ⟨ɐː⟩. See New Zealand English phonology
English	Mid-Ulster	bra	[bɹɐ̞ː]	'bra'	
English	Mid-Ulster	bra	[bɹɐ̞ː]	'bra'	Can be more front [a] instead.
English	Mid-Ulster	trap	[t̪͆ɹäp]	'trap'	Can be more front [a] instead.
English	Some Canadian and Californian speakers	trap	[t̠ɹ̝̊äp̚]	'trap'	See Canadian Shift and English phonology
English	Multicultural London	trap	[t̠ɹ̝̊äʔp]	'trap'	More front [a] in other Southern England English.
English	Northern England	trap	[tʰɹäp]	'trap'	More front [a] in Scouse.
French	Parisian	patte	[pät̪]	'paw'	Older speakers have two contrastive open vowels: front /a/ and back /ɑ/. See French phonology
German		Katze	[ˈkʰät͡sə]	'cat'	Can be more front or more back in regional Standard German. See Standard German phonology
Hindustani	Hindi	जान / jaan	[d͡ʒäːn]	'life','sweetheart', 'beloved' or 'darling'	Allophone of [aː ~ ɑ]. See Hindustani phonology.
Hindustani	Urdu	جان / jaan	[d͡ʒäːn]	'life','sweetheart', 'beloved' or 'darling'	Allophone of [aː ~ ɑ]. See Hindustani phonology.
Hungarian		láb	[läːb]	'leg'	See Hungarian phonology
Italian		casa	[ˈkäːsä]	'home'	See Italian phonology
Japanese		蚊 / ka	[kä]	'mosquito'	See Japanese phonology
Limburgish	Hamont-Achel dialect	zaak	[ˈzǎ̠ːk]	'business'	Front [aː] in other dialects.
Lithuanian		ratas	[räːtɐs̪]	'wheel'	See Lithuanian phonology
Malay	Standard	رق / rak	[räʔ]	'shelf'	Can be front [a]. See Malay phonology
Malay	Kedah	کاتيل / katil	[käte]	'bed'	See Kedah Malay
Malay	Kelantan-Pattani	سست / sesat	[səˈsäʔ]	'lost'	See Kelantan-Pattani Malay
Malayalam		വാൾ	[ʋäːɭ̩]	'sword'	See Malayalam phonology
Marathi	Standard	रात्र / rātra	[rät̪̺ɾ̆ʌ̝]	'night'	See Marathi phonology
Polish		kat	[kät̪]	'executioner'	See Polish phonology
Portuguese		vá	[vä]	'go'	See Portuguese phonology
Romanian		cal	[käl]	'horse'	See Romanian phonology
Russian		лак	[ɫäk]	'varnish, nail polish'	See Russian phonology
Serbo-Croatian		пас / pas	[pâ̠s̪]	'dog'	See Serbo-Croatian phonology
Spanish		rata	[ˈrät̪ä]	'rat'	See Spanish phonology
Swedish	Central Standard	bank	[bäŋk]	'bank'	Also described as front [a]. See Swedish phonology
Thai		บางกอก / baang-gɔ̀ɔk	[bäːŋ˧.kɔːk̚˨˩]	'Bangkok'	See Thai phonology
Turkish	Standard	at	[ät̪]	'horse'	Also described as back [ɑ]. See Turkish phonology
Welsh		siarad	[ʃäräd]	'talk'	See Welsh phonology
Yoruba		àbá	[ä̀.bä́]	'idea'	See Yoruba phonology

== Notes ==
Place →	Labial					Coronal										Dorsal					Laryngeal			
Manner ↓	Bilabial		Labiodental		Linguolabial		Dental		Alveolar		Postalveolar		Retroflex		(Alveolo-)palatal		Velar		Uvular		Pharyngeal/epiglottal		Glottal	
Nasal	m̥	m	ɱ̊	ɱ		n̼	n̪̊	n̪	n̥	n	n̠̊	n̠	ɳ̊	ɳ	ɲ̊	ɲ	ŋ̊	ŋ	ɴ̥	ɴ				
Plosive	p	b	p̪	b̪	t̼	d̼	t̪	d̪	t	d			ʈ	ɖ	c	ɟ	k	ɡ	q	ɢ	ʡ		ʔ	
Sibilant affricate							t̪s̪	d̪z̪	ts	dz	t̠ʃ	d̠ʒ	tʂ	dʐ	tɕ	dʑ								
Non-sibilant affricate	pɸ	bβ	p̪f	b̪v			t̪θ	d̪ð	tɹ̝̊	dɹ̝	t̠ɹ̠̊˔	d̠ɹ̠˔			cç	ɟʝ	kx	ɡɣ	qχ	ɢʁ	ʡʜ	ʡʢ	ʔh	
Sibilant fricative							s̪	z̪	s	z	ʃ	ʒ	ʂ	ʐ	ɕ	ʑ								
Non-sibilant fricative	ɸ	β	f	v	θ̼	ð̼	θ	ð	θ̠	ð̠	ɹ̠̊˔	ɹ̠˔	ɻ̊˔	ɻ˔	ç	ʝ	x	ɣ	χ	ʁ	ħ	ʕ	h	ɦ
Approximant		β̞		ʋ				ð̞		ɹ		ɹ̠		ɻ		j		ɰ						˷
Tap/flap		ⱱ̟		ⱱ					ɾ̥	ɾ			ɽ̊	ɽ						ɢ̆		ʡ̆		
Trill	ʙ̥	ʙ							r̥	r		r̠	ɽ̊r̥	ɽr					ʀ̥	ʀ	ʜ	ʢ		
Lateral affricate									tɬ	dɮ			tꞎ	d𝼅	c𝼆	ɟʎ̝	k𝼄	ɡʟ̝						
Lateral fricative							ɬ̪		ɬ	ɮ			ꞎ	𝼅	𝼆	ʎ̝	𝼄	ʟ̝						
Lateral approximant								l̪	l̥	l		l̠	ɭ̊	ɭ	ʎ̥	ʎ	ʟ̥	ʟ		ʟ̠				
Lateral tap/flap									ɺ̥	ɺ			𝼈̊	𝼈		ʎ̆		ʟ̆						

		BL	LD	D	A	PA	RF	P	V	U
Implosive	Voiced	ɓ			ɗ		ᶑ	ʄ	ɠ	ʛ
Implosive	Voiceless	ɓ̥			ɗ̥		ᶑ̊	ʄ̊	ɠ̊	ʛ̥
Ejective	Stop	pʼ			tʼ		ʈʼ	cʼ	kʼ	qʼ
Ejective	Affricate		p̪fʼ	tθʼ	tsʼ	tʃʼ	tʂʼ	tɕʼ	kxʼ	qχʼ
Ejective	Fricative	ɸʼ	fʼ	θʼ	sʼ	ʃʼ	ʂʼ	ɕʼ	xʼ	χʼ
Ejective	Lateral affricate				tɬʼ			c𝼆ʼ	k𝼄ʼ	q𝼄ʼ
Ejective	Lateral fricative				ɬʼ					
Click (top: velar; bottom: uvular)	Tenuis	kʘ qʘ		kǀ qǀ	kǃ qǃ		k𝼊 q𝼊	kǂ qǂ		
Click (top: velar; bottom: uvular)	Voiced	ɡʘ ɢʘ		ɡǀ ɢǀ	ɡǃ ɢǃ		ɡ𝼊 ɢ𝼊	ɡǂ ɢǂ		
Click (top: velar; bottom: uvular)	Nasal	ŋʘ ɴʘ		ŋǀ ɴǀ	ŋǃ ɴǃ		ŋ𝼊 ɴ𝼊	ŋǂ ɴǂ	ʞ	
Click (top: velar; bottom: uvular)	Tenuis lateral				kǁ qǁ					
Click (top: velar; bottom: uvular)	Voiced lateral				ɡǁ ɢǁ					
Click (top: velar; bottom: uvular)	Nasal lateral				ŋǁ ɴǁ					
