= Henry Brinley Richards =

Welsh composer (1817–1885)

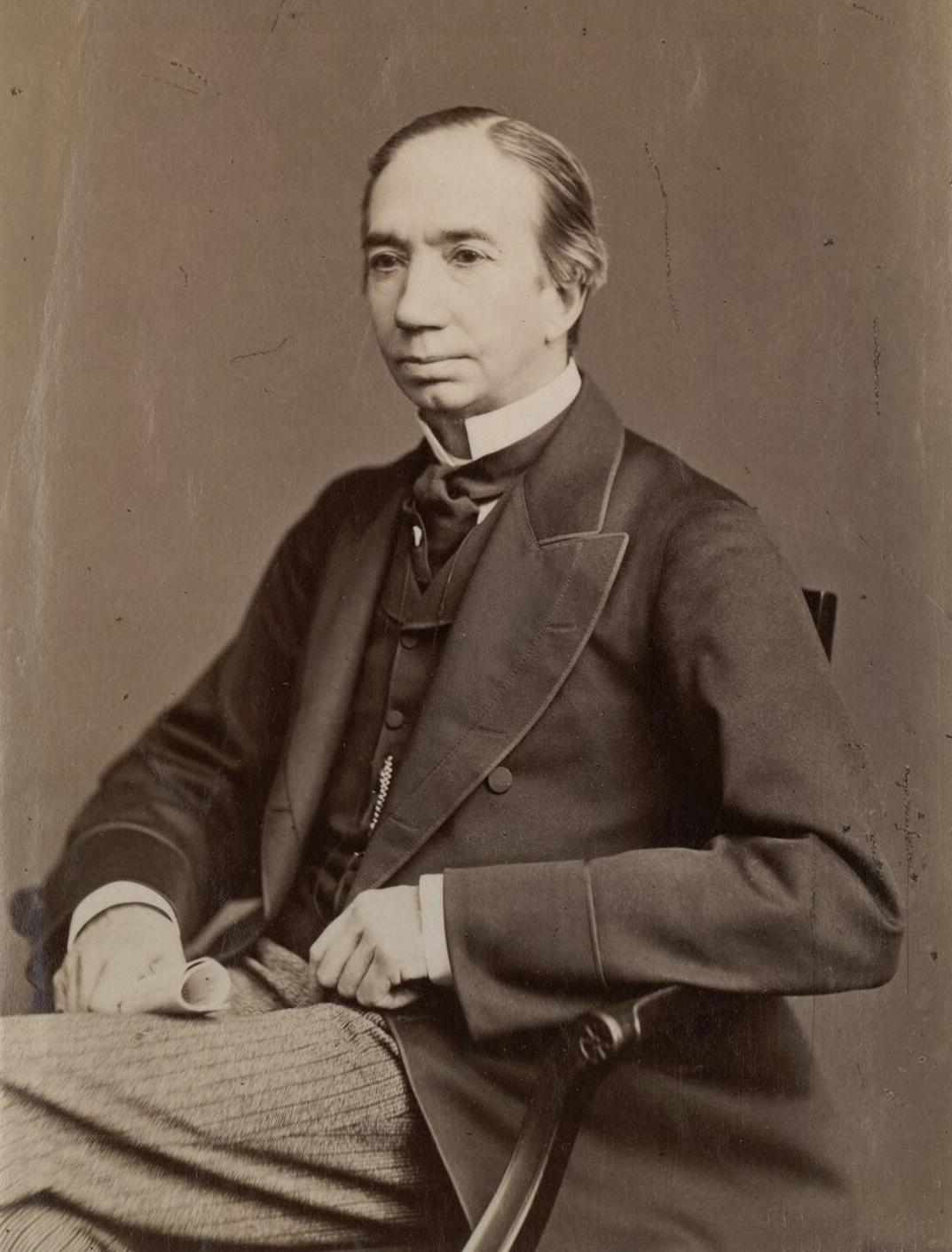
- Richards c. 1880
- Born: 13 November 1817; Carmarthen
- Died: 1 May 1885 (aged 67); Kensington, London
- Occupation: Composer
- Known for: "God Bless the Prince of Wales" (1862)

Henry Brinley Richards (13 November 1817 – 1 May 1885) was a Welsh composer, who also published some works under the pseudonym 'Carl Luini'.

Richards was born in Hall Street, Carmarthen, his father being organist at St Peter's Church in the town and an organiser of local musical events. Richards won a prize at the Gwent-Morgannwg Eisteddfod of 1834, held at Cardiff, for his arrangement of the popular folk song, "The Ash Grove". As a result, he received the patronage of the Duke of Newcastle; this enabled him to study at the Royal Academy of Music. After completing his studies, he went to Paris where he became a pupil of Frédéric Chopin. It was in Paris that his first major work, the Overture in F Minor, was performed.

He taught piano at the Royal Academy of Music, becoming one of the academy's directors and instigating its regional system of examinations.

Richards' most famous work is the song, "God Bless the Prince of Wales" (1862), written in honour of the future King Edward VII of the United Kingdom. Amongst his greatest works for the piano is the Fantasia on Favorite Airs From Meyerbeer's Opera "Les Huguenots", Op. 75. Although not Welsh-speaking, he was a patron of the National Eisteddfod of Wales and gave encouragement to Welsh music students. He used the bardic name "Pencerdd Towy", and supported Lady Llanover in her efforts to popularise the triple harp. Brinley Richards died at his home in Kensington, London, and is buried in Brompton Cemetery.

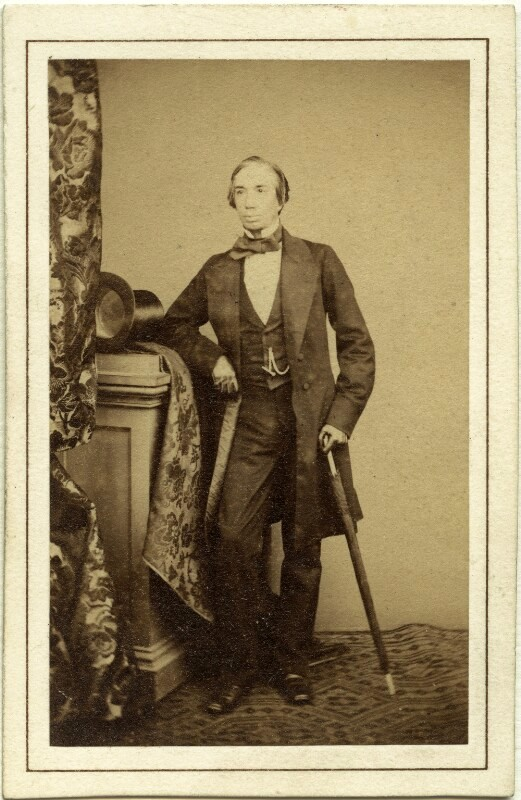
H. B. Richards circa 1860

== Bibliography ==
- A. J. Heward Rees: "Henry Brinley Richards (1817–1885): A Nineteenth-Century Propagandist for Welsh Music", in Welsh Music History, vol. 2 (1996)
- Owain Edwards and A.F. Leighton Thomas: "Richards, Brinley." Grove Music Online. Oxford Music Online. Oxford University Press. Web. 9 Dec. 2015. <http://www.oxfordmusiconline.com/subscriber/article/grove/music/23384>
