= Peter Elmsley =

English classical scholar (1774–1825)

Peter Elmsley (born Hampstead, London, 5 February 1774 – died Oxford, 8 March 1825) was an English classical scholar.

== Early life and education ==
Peter Elmsley was the younger son of Alexander Elmsley of St Clement Danes, Westminster, who had Scottish ancestry. He was educated at Westminster School (from 5 June 1788) and then at Christ Church, Oxford, where he graduated as a BA in 1794, later being promoted to a Master of Arts in 1797, and receiving the degrees of BD on 30 October 1823 and DD on 7 November 1823. He inherited a fortune in 1802 from his uncle, also named Peter Elmsley, a well-known bookseller in the Strand, and devoted himself to the study of classical authors and manuscripts.

== Professional work ==
Elmsley was ordained a deacon of the Church of England on 31 December 1797 and a priest on 29 April 1798; on the same date in April 1798 he was appointed perpetual curate to the chapelry of Little Horkesley in Essex, which he held until his death.

In around 1802 he lived in Edinburgh, and contributed articles to the Edinburgh Review on Heyne's Iliad, Schweighäuser's Athenæus, Blomfield's Prometheus, and Porson's Hecuba. He also contributed to the Quarterly Review. From 1807 until 1816 he lived at St. Mary Cray, Kent, then from 1816 was based mainly in Oxford. He was elected a Fellow of the Royal Society in 1814.

He travelled extensively in France and Italy, where he collated manuscripts of the classics, and spent the winter of 1818 examining the manuscripts in the Laurentian Library at Florence. In 1819 he was commissioned, with Sir Humphry Davy, to decipher the papyri found at Herculaneum, but the results proved insignificant. In 1823 he was appointed principal of St Alban Hall, Oxford, and Camden Professor of Ancient History. He held both of these appointments until his death, from heart disease, at St Alban Hall, on 8 March 1825. A monument to his memory carved by Joseph Theakston was placed in Oxford Cathedral later that year.

Elmsley was a man of great learning and European reputation, and was considered to be the best ecclesiastical scholar in England. He is best known for his collation of the manuscripts of the Greek tragedians, in particular Sophocles and Euripides, and his important work on restoring their text. Editors who have worked in the same field have praised his careful method and diligence in drawing together authorities for the purposes of illustration. He edited The Acharnians of Aristophanes, and several of the plays and scholia of Sophocles and Euripides. He was the first to recognise the importance of the Laurentian manuscript 32.9, a facsimile of a text by Sophocles.

== Publications (selection) ==
- Aristophanes, Acharnians, [Arhistophanus Acharnes. Aristophanis comoedia Acharnenses in usum studiosae juventutis emendata et illustrata], Oxford and London: 1809.
- Euripides, Euripidis Omnia Opera, Glasgow: 1821. Also various plays of Euripides, separately, between 1806 and 1822.
- Sophocles, Œdipus Tyrannus, London: 1809.
- Sophocles, Œdipus Coloneus, Oxford: 1823.
