= James Burton (priest) =

English priest (1745–1825)

- Born: 1 May 1745; Aynho, Northamptonshire
- Died: 30 June 1825 (aged 80); Oxford
- Spouse: Mary Anne Jenner

James Burton (1 May 1745 – 30 June 1825) was an English priest from Northamptonshire. He was a senior canon of Christ Church, Oxford (1793–1825) and chaplain to King George III. He was the older brother of the barrister and judge, Charles Burton.

== Biography ==
=== Early life ===
Burton was born in Aynho, the son of Francis Burton (1709–1777), a member of a family that could trace its descent from Ingenulfe de Burton who came to England with William the Conqueror. His mother was Anne Burton, née Singer (1716–1792).

Burton was educated at Magdalen College, Oxford, entering as a chorister in 1755 and matriculating as an undergraduate in 1761. He continued his education at Magdalen, gaining a B.A. in 1765 and M.A. in 1768.

=== Career ===
In 1762, Burton was admitted as a demy by Magdalen College, a post which he retained until shortly after his marriage in 1774. He took holy orders and became rector of Over Worton, vicar of Little Berkhamstead and incumbent at Waddesdon. He gained a B.D. in 1788, and a D.D. the following year. He was also chaplain in ordinary to George III and George IV, and became a senior canon at Christ Church, Oxford from 1793 until his death.

=== Marriage and children ===
In 1774, Burton married Mary Anne Jenner (1751–1788). They had nine children (5 boys and 4 girls), of which two of the daughters died in infancy. The surviving children were:

- Arthur Francis Burton (1777–1819) – priest.
- James Singer Burton (1778–1818) – gentleman usher to George III.
- Robert Burton (1779–1801)
- Charles William Burton (1780–1816) – army officer who served and died in India, and married Mary Anne Gilchrist, daughter of John Borthwick Gilchrist.
- Rachel Burton (b. 1782)
- Mary Anne Burton (b. 1784) – married Rev. Edward Marshall.
- Cecil Hill Burton (1788–1813) – also an army officer who died in India.

=== Death ===
Burton died on 30 June 1825, and was buried at Fetcham on 7 July 1825.
