= Peter Elmsley (bookseller) =

- Born: 1736; Aberdeenshire
- Died: 3 May 1802 (aged 65–66); Brighton
- Other names: Elmsly
- Occupation: Bookseller

Peter Elmsley or Elmsly (1736–1802) was a British bookseller, born in Aberdeenshire in 1736, who succeeded Paul Vaillant (1716–1802), whose family had carried on a foreign bookselling business in the Strand, London, opposite Southampton Street, since 1686.

== Life ==
Elmsley, with Thomas Cadell, Robert Dodsley, and others, formed a literary club of booksellers who produced many important works, including Samuel Johnson's Lives of the Poets. The historian Edward Gibbon wrote to Lord Sheffield, 2 October 1793: 'My first evening was passed at home in a very agreeable tête-a-tête with my friend Elmsley,' and the following month he speaks of lodging in a 'house of Elmsley's' in St. James's Street. Elmsley was intimate with John Wilkes, and directed the sale of his library. Miss Wilkes ordered that 'all her manuscripts, of whatever kind,... be faithfully delivered to Mr. Elmsly [sic],' but he died before her. To the usual Scottish schooling, Elmsley added a large fund of information acquired by his own exertions in later life. He knew French well. His business career was honourable and prosperous, and many of the leading book collectors and literary men of the day were on friendly terms with him. A short time before his death he gave up his business to a shopman, David Bremner, who soon died, and was succeeded by James Payne & J. Mackinlay, the one the youngest son of Thomas Payne of the Mews-gate, the other one of Elmsley's assistants.

Elmsley died at Brighton, 3 May 1802, in his sixty-seventh year. His remains were conveyed to his house in Sloane Street, London, and were buried at Marylebone 10 May. He left a widow. A handsome share of his large fortune fell to his nephew, the Rev. Peter Elmsley (1773–1825).

== Notes ==
=== References ===
- This article incorporates text from a publication now in the public domain: Tedder, Richard Henry (1888). "Elmsley, Peter (1736–1802)". In Stephen, Leslie (ed.). Dictionary of National Biography. Vol. 16. London: Smith, Elder & Co. pp. 165, 166. Endnotes:
  - Memoirs, 1814, pp. 408, 411).
  - Gent. Mag. lxxii. pt. i. 467
