= John Fisher the elder, and John Fisher the younger (sculptors) =

English sculptors, father and son

This father and son from York, England were sculptors through the 18th century and into the 19th century. John Fisher the elder lived between 1736 and 1804, whilst John Fisher the younger is thought to be born around 1760 and died in 1839. Their work is well represented in York Minster and in other Yorkshire towns.

Since their work is hard to distinguish one from the other (indeed they probably worked together on some pieces) their work is normally viewed as a pair. It is unlikely clearly that John Fisher the younger worked on anything before the age of 14 (1774) and clearly John Fisher the elder did not work beyond the year of his death (1804), but works in between may be viewed as combined works.

Apprentices in the Fisher yard included Joseph Theakston.

== Known works in chronological order ==
- Figure of "Our Saviour with the Cross", Lady Chapel, York Minster (1761)
- Figure of Jupiter, Museum of the Philosophical Society, York, England (1761)
- Monument to Robinson Morley at Brayton, North Yorkshire (1766)
- Two chimney-pieces for the Marquess of Rockingham at Wentworth Woodhouse (1768)
- Monument to Ann Cayley at Burton Agnes, Yorkshire (1769)
- Monument to G Staines in Ripon Cathedral (1771)
- Monument to James Buller at St. Thomas's Church, Exeter (1772)
- Monument to Catherine Cholmley at Whitby, Yorkshire (1772)
- Monument to Charles Outybridge at Clarborough, Nottinghamshire (1772)
- Monument with figure of Hygeia to John Dealtry in York Minster (1773)
- Monument to William Danby at Masham, Yorkshire (1773)
- Monument to Godfrey Heathcote at Chesterfield, Derbyshire (1773)
- Monument to Mary Darby at Harpham, Yorkshire (1773)
- Monument to Sybil Wilson depicting the child's parents mourning at her tomb, Lancaster, Lancashire Parish Church (1773)
- Monument to Richard Bagshaw at Norton, Derbyshire (1776)
- Monument to Thomas Bowes at St. Crux Church, York (1777)
- Monument to Amelia Sparre at Thirsk, Yorkshire (1778)
- Monument to Henry Waite at St. Crux Church, York (1780)
- Monument to John Dunn at Howden, Yorkshire (1780)
- Figure of "Religion" on monument to Sir Charles Sheffield, at Burton upon Stather, Lincolnshire (1780)
- Chimney-piece in the dining-room of Farnley Hall, Yorkshire (c.1783)
- Monument to William Hutchinson at St. Michael's Church, York (1784)
- Statue of Sir George Savile, 8th Baronet, York Minster (1784)
- Monument to Hannah Mosley in Newcastle Cathedral (1784)
- Monument to Edward Forster at Thorne, South Yorkshire (1784)
- Monument to the Rev. John Varley at Stillington, North Yorkshire (1784)
- Monument to Rev George Anderson in York Minster (1785)
- Monument to Mary Pulleyn in York Minster (1786)
- Monument to Sir Thomas Davenport in York Minster (1786)
- Monument to Henry Roxby in Beverley Minster (1795)
- Monument to Henry Whittam in York Minster (1809)
