= Gilchrist Educational Trust =

The Gilchrist Educational Trust is a British charity supporting education, perhaps best known for its support of the Gilchrist Lectures from 1867 to 1939.

The trust was established in 1841 by the will of British Indologist, John Borthwick Gilchrist, but could not begin work until 1865 due to litigation culminating in an 1858 hearing before the House of Lords. Gilchrist's will directed that the trust be used 'for the benefit advancement and propagation of education and learning in every part of the world as far as circumstances will permit.'

Early efforts included scholarships to bring Indian students to England for a university education. When these scholarships were taken over by the Government of India, efforts turned to similar scholarships for other British colonies. When women's colleges were being established, the trust began to provide scholarships for women.

The Gilchrist Lectures were mainly on scientific topics and aimed at working class adults in industrial areas of Great Britain.

== Grants ==
At present the trust provides four types of educational grants:

- Individuals - full-time students at a British university who face unexpected financial difficulties.
- Organisations - for efforts by British organisations.
- Expeditions - modest-sized British expeditions for scientific research abroad.
- Fieldwork Award - biennial award of £15,000 for British overseas research.

== Collections ==
The archives of the Trust were deposited at the Institute of Education, University College London in 2001 and 2006. The collection includes administrative papers, material about John Borthwick Gilchrist and publications by the Trust.
