= Derry's Walls =

Song

"Derry's Walls" is a historical song sung in Northern Ireland. It commemorates the Siege of Derry in 1689.

The author of the words is unknown, and it is sung to the tune of "God Bless the Prince of Wales.”

A modified rendition is also popular amongst supporters of Rangers F.C.

== Lyrics ==
Verse 1

The time has scarce gone round boys
Three hundred years ago
When Rebels on old Derry's Walls
Their faces dare not show
When James and all his rebel band
Came up to Bishops Gate
With heart and hand, and sword and shield
We caused them to retreat.

Chorus.

We'll fight and won't surrender
But come when duty calls
With heart and hand, and sword and shield
We'll guard old Derry's Walls.

Verse 2

Tho blood did flow in crimson streams
Through many a winter's night
They knew the Lord was on their side
To help them in their fight
They nobly stood upon the walls
Determined for to die,
Or fight and gain the victory
And raise the Crimson high;

Chorus.

We'll fight and won't surrender
But come when duty calls
With heart and hand, and sword and shield
We'll guard old Derry's Walls.

Verse 3

At last, at last, with one broadside,
Kind heaven sent them aid,
The boom that blocked The Foyle was broke
And James he was dismayed
The banner, boys, that floated
Was run aloft with joy,
God bless the ship that broke the boom,
And saved the Apprentice Boys!

Chorus.

We'll fight and won't surrender
But come when duty calls,
With heart and hand, and sword and shield
We'll guard old Derry's Walls.
