= Joseph Theakston =

British sculptor

Joseph Theakston (1772 – 14 April 1842) was a 19th-century British sculptor mainly working in the Hellenistic style.

He was called the "ablest (most able) drapery or ornamental carver of his time".

== Life ==
He was the son of John Theakston (1735–1780) of St Michael's Parish, Spurriergate in York and his wife, Sarah Hague (1744–1789). His father died when he was young.

He was apprenticed in 1786, at the standard age of 14, to the sculptor John Fisher of York. He was declared a Freeman stonemason in 1794 and went to London where he studied further under John Bacon the Elder, before becoming an assistant to John Flaxman and then Edward Hodges Baily. From 1818 to 1848, he was assistant to Francis Chantrey. He specialised in the foliage, torsos drapery and details, where Chantrey etc. concentrated on faces and hands.

He exhibited at the Royal Academy from 1809 to 1837 and at the British Institution from 1813 to 1819.

He died at Belgrave Place in Belgravia London on 14 April 1842 and was buried with his wife in Kensal Green Cemetery. His will was settled on 12 November 1842 and is held at the National Archives in Kew.

== Works ==
- Monument to Raymundo Putt in Gittisham (1812)
- Bust of R Walker (1813)
- Bust of Charles Henry Schwanfelder (1818)
- The iron railings outside Westminster Abbey (1821)
- Monument to Sir William Herschel at Upton, Buckinghamshire (1822)
- Monument to Anthony Hamond at West Acre, Norfolk (1822)
- Monument to Robert Dorner at Budbrook, Warwick (1823)
- Monument to classicist Peter Elmsley at Oxford Cathedral (1825)
- Monument to Lady Sophia Heathcote at Normanton, Rutland (1825)
- Monument to Thomas Hetherington at Walthamstow Parish Church (1825)
- Monument to Bishop Reginald Heber in St Peter's Church in Colombo Sri Lanka (1826)
- Monument to brewer William Davey at Redruth (1827)
- Monument to Mary Inglis at Wartling (1827)
- Monument to Sophia Matlock at Bramley, Surrey (1828)
- Monument to Archbishop Charles Manners-Sutton at Addington, Surrey (1828)
- Monument to Georgina Serocold-Pearce at Cherry Hinton (1828)
- Monument to Bishop Charles Lloyd at Oxford Cathedral (1829)
- Chimneypiece and carved marble clock-frame for Buckingham Palace (1829) incorporating two winged female figures and a bust of King George IV, all at cost of £1000
- Monument to Frances Goring at Wiston, Sussex (1830)
- Bust of Queen Victoria (1830)
- Monument to John Christie at Broxbourne (1831)
- Monument to Marmaduke Ramsay (brother of Edward Bannerman Ramsay) at the Chapel of Jesus College, Cambridge (1831)
- Monument to Rev Charles Platt at Forthampton (1833)
- Monument to Frederick Page at Speen, Berkshire (1834)
- Monument to Ann Pearce at Cherry Hinton (1835)
- Monument to Anne Wynter at Lanlivery (1839)
- Monument to Rev Roger Carus Wilson in Preston Parish Church (1839)

== Family ==
He was married to Elizabeth Pearson (1775 – 1833) and had at least nine children.
