= God Bless the Prince of Wales =

1862 patriotic song

"God Bless the Prince of Wales" (Welsh: Ar Dywysog Gwlad y Bryniau) is a royalist song. It was written to mark the occasion of the marriage of the then Prince of Wales, future King Edward VII to Alexandra of Denmark in 1863. The song was first performed at the Caernarfon Eisteddfod of 1862.

== Text ==
The words were written by the poet John Ceiriog Hughes and the music by Henry Brinley Richards. The English words are by George Linley. The song was completed and performed in 1863.

Ar D'wysog gwlad y bryniau,
O boed i'r nefoedd wen,
Roi iddo gyda choron,
Ei bendith ar ei ben!

Pan syrthio'r aur wialen,
Pan elo un i'r nef,
Y nef a ddalio i fyny
Ei law frenhinol ef!

Among our ancient mountains,
And from our lovely vales,
Oh! Let the prayer re-echo
God bless the Prince of Wales!

With hearts and voice awaken
Those minstrel strains of yore,
Till Britain's name and glory,
Resounds from shore to shore.

== Melody ==
In parts of Scotland and Ireland the tune is used to sing "Derry's Walls", a unionist song. The Australian composer and author Andrew Ford noted that the last line of the Australian national anthem, "Advance Australia Fair", is identical to the final line of this song.
