= John Gilchrist (linguist) =

Scottish linguist, philologist and Indologist

John Gilchrist FRSE
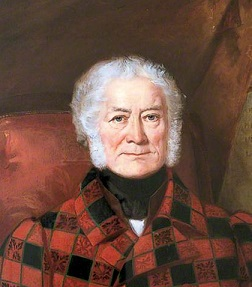
- Detail from portrait of Gilchrist by Blanconi, presented to UCL, 1866
- Born: John Hay Gilchrist; 19 June 1759; Edinburgh, Scotland
- Died: 8 January 1841 (aged 81); Paris, France
- Other name: John Borthwick Gilchrist
- Education: University of Edinburgh
- Known for: Study of Hindustani; Foundation of the Gilchrist Educational Trust
- Scientific career
- Fields: Linguistics; Lexicology; Indology

John Borthwick Gilchrist FRSE (19 June 1759 – 9 January 1841) was a Scottish surgeon, linguist, philologist and Indologist. Born and educated in Edinburgh, he spent most of his early career in India, where he made a study of the local languages. In later life, he returned to Britain and lived in Edinburgh and London. In his final years, he moved to Paris, where he died at the age of 81.

He is principally known for his study of the Hindustani language, which led to it being adopted as the lingua franca of northern India (including present-day Pakistan) by British colonists and indigenous people. He compiled and authored An English-Hindustani Dictionary, A Grammar of the Hindoostanee Language, The Oriental Linguist, and many more. His lexicon of Hindustani was published in Arabic script, Nāgarī script, and in Roman transliteration. He is also known for his role in the foundation of University College London and for endowing the Gilchrist Educational Trust.

== Biography ==
=== Early life and education ===
Gilchrist was born on 19 June 1759 in Edinburgh, and baptised on 22 June 1759 with the names John Hay Gilchrist. His father was Walter Gilchrist, but very little is known about him except that he was a merchant who disappeared the year that John was born. His mother was Henrietta Farquharson (1730-1830), originally from Dundee, who lived to the very advanced age of 100. In later life, Gilchrist obtained a licence to use the name Borthwick, his maternal grandmother's surname, based on her descendancy from the Borthwick title in the Scottish peerage.

He was educated at George Heriot's School and the Edinburgh High School (1773–1775). At the age of 16, he travelled to the West Indies, where he gained a knowledge of the cultivation and production of indigo. He remained there for two or three years before returning to Edinburgh.

=== Career in India ===
In 1782, Gilchrist was apprenticed as a surgeon's mate in the Royal Navy and travelled to Bombay, India. There, he joined the East India Company's Medical Service and was appointed assistant surgeon in 1784. He marched with the company's Bengal Army to Fatehgarh, and during this journey he noted the extent to which the Hindustani language could be understood in different parts of the country. However, he was surprised that the company neither required nor encouraged their employees to learn it, and subsequent experiences convinced him that officers in the army should also learn it in order to communicate effectively with the Indian soldiers or sepoys.

==== Hindustani dictionary ====
Gilchrist began a systematic study of Hindustani, and from this work he created his first dictionary. In 1785 he requested a year's leave from duty to continue these studies. This leave was eventually granted in 1787 and Gilchrist never returned to the Medical Service. He spent 12 years living at various places, including Patna, Faizabad, Lucknow, Delhi, and Ghazipur. He travelled extensively to work with native speakers and also to garner material. In Ghazipur, to help finance his work, he also engaged in the production of indigo, sugar and opium – an enterprise which was initially successful but eventually failed.

In 1786, he advertised his first publication, A Dictionary: English and Hindoostanee. To which Is Prefixed a Grammar of the Hindoostanee Language. This was published by subscription and issued in instalments to be completed in 1790. It was the first printed publication in Devanagari type, as developed by the Orientalist and typographer, Charles Wilkins. The government promised to take 150 sets at 40 rupees each, and the price rose eventually to 60 rupees.

==== Background to the Hindustani language ====
In Northern India, the Hindustani language developed from the need of the new migrants of Persian and Turkish origin to communicate with people in Delhi and the surrounding regions. The local populace spoke Dehlavi dialect, one of the Hindi languages, which supplied the basic vocabulary and grammar but also absorbed a lot of words from Persian to form Hindustani.

Gilchrist popularized Hindustani as the language of British administration. When he started as a surgeon with the East India Company's payroll, he was told that Persian was India's main language, but he quickly discovered that none of the people he met spoke either Persian or Arabic very well. His interactions with people helped him to discover that Hindustani was already known to some in the East India Company. They referred to the language as Moors language or simply Jargon, and it was Gilchrist who adopted this as the new language of administration for British India.

==== Fort William College ====
On Gilchrist's suggestion, the Governor-General, the Marquess of Wellesley, and the East India Company decided to set up a training institution for its recruits in Calcutta. This started as the Oriental Seminary or Gilchrist ka madrasa, but was enlarged within a year to become Fort William College in 1800. Gilchrist served as the first principal of the college until 1804, and through the personal patronage of Wellesley received a generous salary of 1500 rupees a month, or about £1800 per year (about £180,000 in present-day terms). During this time, he also published a number of books: The Stranger's East India Guide to the Hindoostanee or Grand Popular Language of India, The Hindustani Manual or Casket of India, Nastaliq-e-Hindoe, The Hindu Roman Orthoeptical Ultimatum, The Oriental Fabulist, and others.

Under Gilchrist's leadership, Fort William also became a centre for Urdu prose. The language they taught was meant for young British people to acquire a general practical knowledge for administrative purposes, and not for native speakers of the language. He gathered around him writers from all over India who were able to produce a simple Urdu style that was "intelligible to British officers and merchants who had no use for poetry". One of Gilchrist's pupils was the missionary Henry Martyn, an Anglican priest and chaplain for the East India Company, who revised the Hindustani version of the New Testament and later translated it, together with the Book of Psalms and Book of Common Prayer, into Urdu and Persian. By the early nineteenth century, the Persian language was gradually replaced by Urdu as the vernacular to serve as the administrative language in a growing colonial bureaucracy.

In 1803, Gilchrist inducted other writers into the college, who helped make rapid strides in Hindi language and literature. Subsequently, a Hindi translation of the Bible appeared in 1818 and Udant Martand, the first Hindi newspaper, was published in 1826 in Calcutta.

Scholars debate Gilchrist's role in the distillation of Hindustani into the modern languages of Hindi and Urdu, but according to Gilchrist, the rise of the new prose tradition was also the "bifurcation of Khariboli into two forms – the Hindustani language with Khariboli as the root resulted in two languages (Hindi and Urdu), each with its own character and script." He not only discovered/invented the Hindustani language, but he was credited as a great patron of Urdu and indirectly the reinvigoration of Hindi. During his time at Fort William College, he encouraged the use of the purer form of Khariboli from which contemporary Hindi evolved. In the words of K.B. Jindal, author of A History of Hindi Literature: "Hindi as we know it today is the product of the nineteenth century."

Another view was that of George Abraham Grierson, an Irish linguist and civil servant, who said that the standard or pure Hindi which contemporary Indians use is "an artificial dialect the mother tongue of no native-born Indian, a newly invented speech, that wonderful hybrid known to Europeans as Hindi and invented by them."

=== Land in Australia ===
In 1801, while still in India, Gilchrist acquired a substantial holding of land near Sydney, Australia, from William Balmain. He bought this for a nominal sum in settlement of a debt. Gilchrist never went to Australia, but as Sydney subsequently developed, the value of this holding (now part of the suburb named Balmain) rose substantially.

=== Return to Britain ===
In 1804, Gilchrist was granted leave of absence from his position at Fort William and travelled back to Britain. However, due to ill health, he never returned to India. He retired from the service of the East India Company in 1805 and was awarded a pension for the remainder of his life. He took an interest in the Borthwick title and, through a series of grants of arms, he eventually styled himself, "John Borthwick Gilchrist, of Camberwell, in the county of Surrey, LL.D., late Professor of the Hindoostanee Language in the College of Fort William, at Calcutta."

In 1806, when the East India College was established at Haileybury, Hertfordshire, its original plan called only for the teaching of Arabic and Persian. However, the first appointed Oriental Professor, Jonathan Scott, a scholar of these languages, resigned even before the College opened its doors. Gilchrist succeeded him but held the post only a few months.

Later the same year, Gilchrist moved to Edinburgh where, in partnership with James Inglis, he founded a banking firm, Inglis, Borthwick Gilchrist & Co, which operated from a flat in Hunter Square. He also became in 1807 a fellow of the Royal Society of Edinburgh (proposed by William Moodie, John Playfair and James Bonar), the Horticultural Society, the East India Club, and the Scottish Military and Naval Academy. He gained a reputation for being somewhat eccentric, with a fiery temper and violent politics and language. One of his eccentricities was to erect an aviary containing exotic birds on the side of his house on Nicolson Square.

In 1815 his banking business ran into difficulties and was dissolved. He moved for a brief period to Perthshire, resolving never to return to Edinburgh. He then moved to London in 1817 and the following year was appointed as lecturer in oriental languages for the East India Company, a position he held until 1825. However, after this employment ceased, he controversially continued to give lectures without payment, as a vehicle to promote the sale of his works as textbooks. With a similar view, he assisted in the foundation of the London Oriental Institution and became a founding shareholder of University College London, serving as its first Professor of Hindustani. He also worked with George Birkbeck to establish the London Mechanics Institution (later Birkbeck College).

=== Marriage and children ===
Gilchrist fathered a number of children during his time in India between 1782 and 1804. However, their legitimacy and the identity of the mother are unclear, and it appears that several died young. One surviving daughter, Mary Anne (b. 1786), may have remained in India after Gilchrist departed and it is known that, in 1810, she married Major Charles William Burton in Calcutta. He was the son of James Burton, canon of Christ Church, Oxford and chaplain to George III and George IV. Charles William Burton died at Mirzapur in 1816 and decades later, his and Mary Anne's son, Major Charles Aeneas Burton, was murdered together with his two sons at Kotah in 1857, during the Indian mutiny.

It is also known that three other Indian-born daughters returned with Gilchrist to Britain:

- Henrietta (1797–1864) married James Wilson, a merchant, in Edinburgh in 1815.
- Elizabeth (b. 1801) married John Mann, a jeweller, in Edinburgh in 1818.
- Violet (1802–1872) married the writer and composer, George Linley, in Edinburgh in 1824.

After his return to Edinburgh, Gilchrist married Mary Ann Coventry on 15 May 1808, a woman nearly 30 years his junior, with whom he had no children. After he died, she married General Guglielmo Pepe, Prince of the Kingdom of Naples.

=== Final years, death and legacy ===
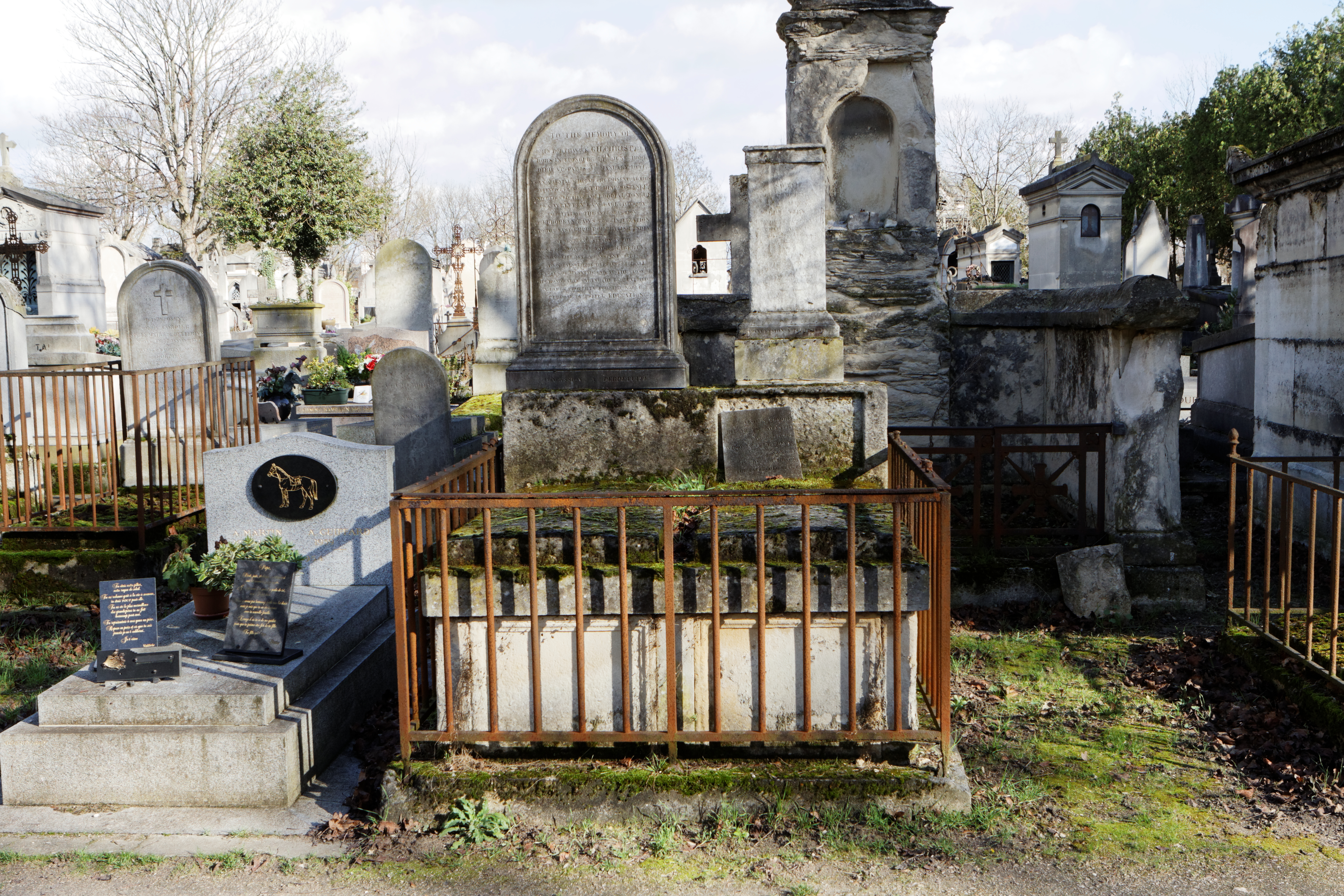
Tomb at the Père-Lachaise Cemetery.

Gilchrist travelled to the Continent several times between 1825 and 1831, for reasons of ill health. He settled in Paris almost permanently from 1831 onwards, obtaining a French passport for himself, his wife and two servants, and resided in the Rue Matignon. He died there on 9 January 1841, aged 81, and was buried in the Père-Lachaise Cemetery.

==== Will ====
Gilchrist left a considerable fortune, which included property and investments in London and Edinburgh, as well as the Balmain estate in Australia. In his will, he appointed the Member of Parliament, Joseph Hume, to be his principal executor, and instructed that his assets be sold and the proceeds held in a charitable trust. From the Trust's income, he granted annuities to his widow and surviving daughters. The residual income he instructed to be used "for the benefit and advancement and propagation of education and learning in every part of the world as far as circumstances will permit."

==== Legal battle ====
The will was contested by some members of Gilchrist's family. The principal appellant was his nephew, Walter Gilchrist Whicker (son of his sister, Helen), who considered himself to be Gilchrist's legitimate heir-at-law. The case, known as Whicker v Hume, was complex and considered several issues:

- Gilchrist's legal domicile at the time of his death. It was argued that this should be Scotland or France (his countries of birth and death, respectively), rather than England, where the will had been drawn up.
- The legitimacy of Gilchrist's Indian-born daughters.
- The jurisdiction which applied to the land in the colony of New South Wales, and whether the legal doctrine of mortmain applied to it.
- Whether Gilchrist's words "education and learning" constituted a valid charitable objective.

The case dragged on for many years and eventually went as far as the House of Lords, which handed down its final judgement upholding the validity of the will in July 1858, over 17 years after Gilchrist's death and after which time several of the parties, including both Whicker and Hume, had themselves died. It has become a significant legal precedent, regarding the definition of domicile and the jurisdiction under which a will must be executed.

==== Gilchrist Educational Trust ====
An unexpected side-effect of the lengthy legal battle was that the value of the land in Australia had in the meantime increased to an estimated £70,000, and the total value of Gilchrist's estate when probate was finally granted was in excess of £100,000 (over £10,000,000 in current values). With this large endowment, the Gilchrist Educational Trust was finally able in 1865 to start its work, and continues to the present day to provide financial grants to individuals and organizations for educational purposes.

== Character and political views ==
Gilchrist had a fiery temperament and frequently became involved in arguments. He had a lifelong habit of expressing his views and frustrations in letters and printed pamphlets, blaming everyone except himself for the woes that afflicted him from time to time. He has been described as "alternately rambling and forthright, self-pitying and aggressive – indeed, at times downright abusive." Despite this, he was usually treated exceptionally well by those in a position of authority and patronage, and by various means he became a very wealthy man – even if his business methods were sometimes rather unethical.

During his time in Edinburgh, he became notorious for his radical political views and became an outspoken advocate of republicanism. Inevitably, these views made him enemies, and together with the collapse of his banking business, it led him to forsake his native city for the rest of his life – returning only occasionally for brief visits to his mother.

There are no likenesses of him in his younger days, but as an old man Chambers' Biographical Dictionary describes him as "his bushy head and whiskers were as white as the Himalayan snow, and in such contrast to the active expressive face which beamed from the centre of the mass, that he was likened to a royal Bengal tiger – a resemblance of which he was even proud."

== Published works ==
- A Dictionary: English and Hindoostanee, Calcutta: Stuart and Cooper, 1787–90.
- A Grammar, of the Hindoostanee Language, or Part Third of Volume First, of a System of Hindoostanee Philology, Calcutta: Chronicle Press, 1796.
- The Anti-Jargonist; a short and familiar introduction to the Hindoostanee Language, with an extensive Vocabulary, Calcutta, 1800.
- Dialogues, English and Hindoostanee, calculated to promote the colloquial intercourse of Europeans, on the most useful and familiar subjects, with the natives of India, upon their arrival in that country, Calcutta, 1802(?). Second edition: Edinburgh, Manners and Miller et al., 1809. lxiii, 253 p.
- The Hindee Director, or Student's Introductor to the Hindoostanee Language; comprising the Practical outlines of the improved Orthoepy and Orthography, along with first and general Principles of its Grammar, Calcutta, 1802.
- The Hindee-Arabic Mirror; or improved Arabic practical tables of such Arabic words which are intimately connected with a due knowledge of the Hindoostanee language, Calcutta, 1802.
- The Hindee-Roman Orthoepigraphical Ultimatum, or a systematic descriptive view of the Oriental and Occidental visible sounds of fixed and practical principles for the Language of the East, Calcutta, 1804.
- British Indian Monitor; or, the Antijargonist, Stranger's Guide, Oriental Linguist, and Various Other Works, compressed into a series of portable volumes, on the Hindoostanee Language, improperly called Moors; with considerable information respecting Eastern tongues, manners, customs, &c., Edinburgh: Walker & Grieg, 1806–8.
- Parliamentary reform, on constitutional principles; or, British loyalty against continental royalty, the whole host of sacerdotal inquisitors in Europe, and every iniquitous judge, corrupt ruler, venal corporation, rotten borough, slavish editor, or Jacobitical toad-eater within the British Empire, Glasgow: W. Lang. 1815.
- The Orienti-Occidental Tuitionary Pioneer to Literary Pursuits, by the King's and Company's Officers of all Ranks, Capacities, and Departments, either as probationers at scholastic establishments, during the early periods of life, their outward voyage to the East, or while actually serving in British India...A Complete Regular Series of Fourteen Reports...earnestly recommending also the general Introduction, and efficient Culture immediately, of Practical Orientalism, simultaneously with Useful Occident Learning at all the Colleges, respectable Institutions, Schools, or Academies, in the United Kingdom,...a brief prospectus of the art of thinking made easy and attractive to Children, by the early and familiar union of theory with colloquial practice, on commensurate premises, in some appropriate examples, lists, &c. besides a Comprehensive Panglossal Diorama for a universal Language and Character...a perfectly new theory of Latin verbs, London: 1816.
- The Oriental Green Bag!! Or a Complete Sketch of Edwards Alter in the Royal Exchequer, Containing a full Account of the Battle with the Books between a Belle and a Dragon: by a radical admirer of the great Sir William Jones's civil, religious, and political creed, against whom information have recently been lodged for the Treasonable Offence and heinous crime of deep-rooted Hostility to Corruption and Despotism, in every Shape and Form; on the sacred oath of Peeping Tom at Coventry, London: J.B. Gilchrist, 1820.
- The Hindee-Roman Orthoepigraphical Ultimatum;or a systematic, descriminative view of Oriental and Occidental visible Sounds, on fixed and practical principles for acquiring the ... pronunciation of many Oriental languages; exemplified in one hundred popular anecdotes, ... and proverbs of the Hindoostanee story teller, London: 1820.
- The General East India Guide and Vade Mecum: for the public functionary, government officer, private agent, trader or foreign sojourner, in British India, and the adjacent parts of Asia immediately connected with the honourable East India Company, London: Kingsbury, Parbury and Allen, 1825.
- Dialogues, English and Hindoostanee; for illustrating the grammatical principles of the Strangers' East Indian Guide, and to promote the colloquial intercourse of Europeans on the most indispensable and familiar subjects with the Natives of India immediately upon their arrival in Hindoostan, London: Kingsley, Parbury, and Allen, 1826.
- A Practical Appeal to the Public, Through a Series of Letters, in Defence of the New System of Physic, London: Parbury, Allen, & Co. 1833.
- A Bold Epistolary Rhapsody Addressed to the Proprietors of East-India Stock in particular, and to every individual of the Welch, Scottish and English nations in general, London: Ridgway, 1833.

== Bibliography ==
- Richard Steadman-Jones, Colonialism and Grammatical Representation: John Gilchrist and the Analysis of the Hindustani Language in the Late Eighteenth and Early Nineteenth Centuries, Publications of the Philological Society; 41, 2007 9781405161329
- Sadiqur-Rahman Kidwai, Gilchrist and the 'Language of Hindoostan', PhD thesis, University of Delhi. Rachna Prakashan, 1972.

== Collections ==
The archives of the Gilchrist Educational Trust were deposited at the Institute of Education, University College London in 2001 and 2006. The collection includes administrative papers, material about John Borthwick Gilchrist and publications by the Trust.

== See also ==
- Hindustani language
- Gilchrist Educational Trust
