= Charles Henry Schwanfelder =

English painter

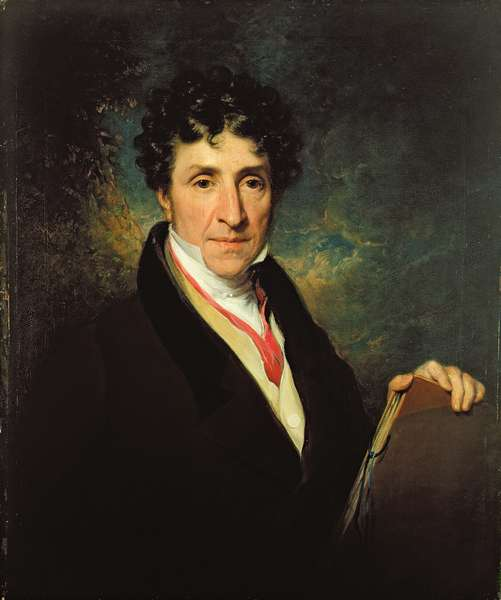
- Charles Henry Schwanfelder in a painting by Joseph Wright
- Born: 1774; Leeds
- Died: 1837 (aged 62–63); Leeds
- Occupations: English animal, landscape and portrait painter.

Charles Henry Schwanfelder (1774–1837) was an English animal, landscape and portrait painter.

Schwanfelder was born and died in Leeds. He was the son of a German decorative painter and started out helping his father to paint clock faces and snuff boxes. He was renowned for his animal paintings and was appointed animal painter to George III and George IV.

He exhibited at the Royal Academy between 1809 and 1814

His bust was carved by Joseph Theakston and exhibited in the Royal Academy in 1818,
