= Urdu Braille =

Braille alphabets of Urdu

Pakistani Urdu Braille
- Script type: Abjad
- Print basis: Urdu alphabet
- Languages: Urdu (in Pakistan)

Related scripts
- Parent systems: Braille: English Braille; Persian Braille; Pakistani Urdu Braille

Indian Urdu Braille
- Script type: Alphabet (?)
- Print basis: Devanagari
- Languages: Urdu (In India)

Related scripts
- Parent systems: Braille: English Braille; Bharati Braille; Indian Urdu Braille

Urdu Braille is the braille alphabet used for Urdu. There are two standard braille alphabets for Urdu, one in Pakistan and the other in India. The Pakistani alphabet is based on Persian Braille and is in use throughout the country, while the Indian alphabet is based on the national Bharati Braille.

== Differences from Persian and Bharati Braille ==
Besides the addition of Urdu-specific consonants analogous to the additional letters in the print Urdu alphabet compared to the Persian alphabet, Pakistani Urdu Braille differs from Persian Braille in the transcription of the print letter ژ ž, which is written as a digraph in Urdu braille rather than as Persian ⠬, which in Urdu is used for ڈ ḍ. (The use of ژ is negligible in Urdu by comparison; the only common use for it is to represent the “s” sound in the English word “division.”)

Indian Urdu Braille differs from other Bharati braille alphabets in having several letters borrowed from Persian, such as ⠟ for ق q (Bharati kṣ), ⠱ for ح ḥ (Bharati jñ), and ⠷ for ع ‘ (Bharati ḻ). Another such letter, ⠭ for خ x, is shared with Gurmukhi Braille ਖ਼ x but with no other Bharati alphabet, where ⠭ is otherwise the vowel o.

== Alphabets ==
Note: Unlike the Perso-Arabic script, Urdu Braille is read left-to-right.

Print		Pakistan	India
ا	–	⠁ (braille pattern dots-1)	(?)
آ	ā	⠜ (braille pattern dots-345)	
ب	b	⠃ (braille pattern dots-12)	
بھ	bh	⠆ (braille pattern dots-23)	⠘ (braille pattern dots-45)
پ	p	⠏ (braille pattern dots-1234)	
پھ	ph	⠖ (braille pattern dots-235)	
پَ	pa	⠭ (braille pattern dots-1346)	
پَھ	pah	⡫ (braille pattern dots-12467)	
ت	t	⠞ (braille pattern dots-2345)	
تھ	th	⠳ (braille pattern dots-1256)	⠹ (braille pattern dots-1456)
ٹ	ṭ	⠪ (braille pattern dots-246)	⠾ (braille pattern dots-23456)
ٹھ	ṭh	⠕ (braille pattern dots-135)	⠺ (braille pattern dots-2456)
ث	ṯ /s/	⠹ (braille pattern dots-1456)	⠐ (braille pattern dots-5) ⠹ (braille pattern dots-1456)
ج	j	⠚ (braille pattern dots-245)	
جھ	jh	⠴ (braille pattern dots-356)	
چ	c	⠉ (braille pattern dots-14)	
چھ	ch	⠡ (braille pattern dots-16)	
ح	ḥ	⠱ (braille pattern dots-156)	
خ	x	⠭ (braille pattern dots-1346)	
د	d	⠙ (braille pattern dots-145)	
دھ	dh	⠙ (braille pattern dots-145) ⠦ (braille pattern dots-236)	⠮ (braille pattern dots-2346)
ڈ	ḍ	⠬ (braille pattern dots-346)	⠫ (braille pattern dots-1246)
ڈھ	ḍh	⠬ (braille pattern dots-346) ⠦ (braille pattern dots-236)	⠿ (braille pattern dots-123456)
ذ	ḏ /z/	⠮ (braille pattern dots-2346)	⠐ (braille pattern dots-5) ⠮ (braille pattern dots-2346)
ر	r	⠗ (braille pattern dots-1235)	
ڑ	ṛ	⠻ (braille pattern dots-12456)	
ڑھ	ṛh	⠻ (braille pattern dots-12456) ⠦ (braille pattern dots-236)	⠐ (braille pattern dots-5) ⠻ (braille pattern dots-12456)
ز	z	⠵ (braille pattern dots-1356)	
ژ	ž	⠐ (braille pattern dots-5) ⠵ (braille pattern dots-1356)	⠐ (braille pattern dots-5) ⠴ (braille pattern dots-356)
س	s	⠎ (braille pattern dots-234)	
ش	š	⠩ (braille pattern dots-146)	
ص	ṡ /s/	⠯ (braille pattern dots-12346)	
ض	ḋ /z/	⠫ (braille pattern dots-1246)	⠐ (braille pattern dots-5) ⠫ (braille pattern dots-1246)
ط	ṫ /t/	⠾ (braille pattern dots-23456)	⠐ (braille pattern dots-5) ⠾ (braille pattern dots-23456)
ظ	ż /z/	⠿ (braille pattern dots-123456)	⠐ (braille pattern dots-5) ⠿ (braille pattern dots-123456)
ع	‘	⠷ (braille pattern dots-12356)	
غ	ğ	⠣ (braille pattern dots-126)	⠐ (braille pattern dots-5) ⠛ (braille pattern dots-1245)
ف	f	⠋ (braille pattern dots-124)	
ق	q	⠟ (braille pattern dots-12345)	
ک	k	⠅ (braille pattern dots-13)	
کھ	kh	⠅ (braille pattern dots-13) ⠦ (braille pattern dots-236)	⠨ (braille pattern dots-46)
گ	g	⠛ (braille pattern dots-1245)	
گھ	gh	⠛ (braille pattern dots-1245) ⠦ (braille pattern dots-236)	⠣ (braille pattern dots-126)
ل	l	⠇ (braille pattern dots-123)	
م	m	⠍ (braille pattern dots-134)	
ن	n	⠝ (braille pattern dots-1345)	
ں	(nasal)	⠰ (braille pattern dots-56)	
و	v/w	⠺ (braille pattern dots-2456)	v ū ō au
ه	h	⠓ (braille pattern dots-125)	
ء	’	⠄ (braille pattern dots-3)	(?)
ی	y	⠊ (braille pattern dots-24)	y ī
ے	ē	⠌ (braille pattern dots-34)	ē ai
َ◌	a	⠂ (braille pattern dots-2)	(?)
ِ◌	i	⠑ (braille pattern dots-15)	(same?)
ُ◌	u	⠥ (braille pattern dots-136)	(same?)
اً	an	⠠ (braille pattern dots-6)	(?)

It is not clear if vowels in Indian Urdu Braille follow pronunciation and their Devanagari Braille equivalents, or print orthography.

== Contractions ==
Pakistani Urdu Braille has several contractions beyond the aspirated consonants:

كو ⠻, اس ⠑, ان ⠔, و ن گ ⠶, نا ⠢, نے ⠼, يا ⠽, لا ⠧, بے ⠤, أ ⠈.

== Punctuation ==
Basic punctuation in Pakistan is the same as in India. See Bharati Braille#Punctuation.

== See also ==
- Hindi Braille
- Punjabi Braille
