= Roman Urdu =

Romanised use of the Urdu language

Roman Urdu refers to the romanised use of Urdu, where the Urdu language is written using the English alphabet. It is mostly used for informal communication on the internet, social media, and text messaging.

According to the Urdu scholar Habib R. Sulemani in 2004: "Roman Urdu is strongly opposed by the traditional Arabic script lovers. Despite this opposition it is still used by most on the internet and computers due to limitations of most technologies as they do not have the Urdu script. Although, this script is under development and thus the net users are using the Roman script in their own ways. Popular websites like Jang Group have devised their own schemes for Roman Urdu. This is of great advantage for those who are not able to read the Arabic script. MSN, Yahoo and some chat-rooms are working as laboratories for the evolving new script and language (Roman Urdu)."

Romanised Urdu is mutually intelligible with Romanised Hindi in informal contexts, unlike Urdu written in the Urdu alphabet and Hindi in Devanagari. Multinational corporations often use it as a cost-effective method for printing and advertising in order to market their products in both Pakistan and India.

Although the idea of romanising Urdu had been suggested several times, it was President Ayub Khan who most seriously suggested adopting the Latin alphabet for Urdu and all Pakistani languages during his rule of the country. The suggestion was inspired to an extent by Mustafa Kemal Atatürk's adoption of the Latin alphabet for Turkish in Turkey.

In India, where the Devanagari script is used, Roman Urdu was widely used in the Indian Army, as well as in Christian mission schools, especially for translations of the Bible.

The Hunterian transliteration system mostly avoids diacritics and non-standard characters.

== Sample texts ==
=== Zabu'r 23 Dáúd ká Mazmúr (Psalm 23) ===
==== Roman Urdu ====
Urdu Bible

^{1}Khudáwand merá chaupán hai; mujhe kamí na hogí.
^{2}Wuh mujhe harí harí charágáhoṉ meṉ bithátá hai: Wuh mujhe ráhat ke chashmoṉ ke pás le játá hai.
^{3}Wuh merí ján bahál kartá hai: Wuh mujhe apne nám kí khátir sadáqat kí ráhon par le chaltá hai.
^{4}Balki khwáh maut ke sáye kí wádí meṉ se merá guzar ho, Maiṉ kisí balá se nahíṉ darúṉgá; kyúnkṉki tú mere sáth hai: Tere 'asá aur terí láthí se mujhe tasallí hai.
^{5}Tú mere dushmanoṉ ke rúbarú mere áge dastarkhwán bichhátá hai: Tú ne mere sir par tel malá hai, merá piyála labrez hotá hai.
^{6}Yaqínan bhalái aur rahmat 'umr bhar mere sáth sáth raheṉgí: Aur maiṉ hamesha Khudáwand ke ghar meṉ sukúnat karúṉgá.

(Kita'b I Muqaddas: Zabu'r 23 az Dáúd)

==== Nastaʿlīq (Perso-Arabic) Script ====
^{۱}خداوند میرا چوپان ہے؛ مجھے کمی نہ ہوگی۔

^{۲}وہ مجھے ہری ہری چراگاہوں میں بٹھاتا ہے: وہ مجھے راحت کے چشموں کے پاس لے جاتا ہے۔
^{۳}وہ میری جان بحال کرتا ہے: وہ مجھے اپنے نام کی خاطر صداقت کی راہوں پر لے چلتا ہے۔
^{۴}بلکہ خواہ موت کے سایے کی وادی میں سے میرا گزر ہو، میں کسی بلا سے نہیں ڈروں گا؛ کیونکہ تو میرے ساتھ ہے: تیرے عصا اور تیری لاٹھی سے مجھے تسلی ہے۔
^{۵}تو میرے دشمنوں کے روبرو میرے آگے دسترخوان بچھاتا ہے: تو نے میرے سر پر تیل ملا ہے، میرا پیالہ لبریز ہوتا ہے۔
^{۶}یقیناً بھلائی اور رحمت عمر بھر میرے ساتھ ساتھ رہیں گی: اور میں ہمیشہ خداوند کے گھر میں سکونت کروں گا۔

(کتاب مقدس کے زبور ۲۳ از داؤد)

==== Devanāgarī script ====
^{१} ख़ुदावन्द मेरा चौपान है; मुझे कमी ना होगी।
^{२} वो मुझे हरी हरी चरागाहों में बिठाता है। वो मुझे राहत के चश्मों के पास ले जाता है।
^{३} वो मेरी जान बहाल करता है। वो मुझे अपने नाम की ख़ातिर सदाक़त की राहों पर ले चलता है।
^{४} बलके ख़्वाह मौत के साये की वादी में से मेरा गुज़र हो, मैं किसी बला से नहीं डरूँगा; क्योंके तू मेरे साथ है। तेरे असा और तेरी लाठी से मुझे तसल्ली है।
^{५} तू मेरे दुश्मनों के रूबरू मेरे आगे दस्तर-ख़्वान बिछाता है। तू ने मेरे सर पर तेल मला है, मेरा पियाला लबरेज़ होता है।
^{६} यक़ीनन भलाई और रहेमत उम्र-भर मेरे साथ साथ रहेंगी और मैं हमेशा ख़ुदावन्द के घर में सुकूनत करूँगा।

(किताब-ए मुक़द्दस के ज़बूर २३ अज़ दाऊद)

== Usage ==
=== Christian community in the Indian subcontinent ===
Roman Urdu Bibles are used by many Christians from the South Asian subcontinent

Urdu was the dominant native language among Christians of Karachi, Uttar Pradesh, and Rajasthan in the 20th century and is still used today by some people in these states. Pakistani and Indian Christians often used the Roman script for writing Urdu. The Bible Society of India publishes Roman Urdu Bibles, which enjoyed sales late into the 1960s (though they are still published today). Church songbooks are also common in Roman Urdu. However, its usage in Christian contexts is declining in India with the wider use of Hindi and English in the states.

=== Film industry ===
Bollywood, India's major film industry, uses a version of Roman script as the main script for its film titles. This is because Bollywood films have an appeal for viewers across South Asia and even in the Middle East. The Devanāgarī script is used mostly by Hindi speakers while the Perso-Arabic script is used primarily by Urdu speakers. The language used in Bollywood films is often called Hindi, but most dialogues are intentionally scripted on a linguistic variety designed to be understood by both Hindi and Urdu speakers alike. Because the film industry aims for mass viewership on the South Asian subcontinent, using the Devanāgarī or Perso-Arabic script is seen as unfavourable, as the choice of alphabet would limit its reach. For this reason, the Latin alphabet is employed as a neutral script for Bollywood film titles, though some films feature usage of Hindi and Urdu scripts on screen as well.

The similar circumstances are also applied with Pakistan's Lollywood film industry, where, along with the Urdu name or title of the movie, a Roman Urdu title is always provided for viewers. It has also become very prevalent in the Pakistani commercial advertisement industry, as slang and statements in the commercials use Roman Urdu to highlight the advertisement.

=== Internet ===
Roman Urdu used on the Internet is non-standard and has irregular spelling. Users who use Roman Urdu on the Internet try to imitate English orthography. In most cases, they are unaware of the fact that English spelling is not always phonetic.

=== Education ===
Roman Urdu is increasingly used in educational resources aimed at diaspora communities and non-native speakers. Kids Bolo has pioneered the use of Roman Urdu in both print and digital formats to teach Urdu. Their approach includes illustrated books written in Roman Urdu and interactive online conversation classes, which simplify language learning for students familiar with the Latin alphabet but not the traditional Urdu script. This methodology helps learners achieve conversational fluency and encourages cultural connection through language.

== Romanisation schemes ==
There are several Romanisation standards for writing Urdu; among them the most prominent are Uddin and Begum Urdu-Hindustani Romanisation, ALA-LC romanisation and ArabTeX.

There are two main problems with existing Roman Urdu schemes. Either they are not reversible to Urdu script, or they do not allow pronouncing the Urdu words properly. Another shortcoming is that a lot of Roman Urdu schemes confuse the Urdu letter 'Choti He' which has the sound of voiceless glottal fricative, with 'Do Chasham He' which is used as a digraph for aspirated consonants in Urdu script. The digraphs "Sh" for letter Shin and "Zh" for letter Zhe also cause problems as they could be interpreted as the letter Sin and 'Choti He' or letter Ze and 'Choti He' respectively. Most Roman Urdu schemes also do not take much consideration of Urdu orthography and the spelling system.

== Informal Roman Urdu ==
The system of Romanisation used most often by native speakers differs from the formal systems presented in most English language sources. It contains no diacritics or special characters, usually just the 26 letters of the core English alphabet.

While the Urdu alphabet is derived from the Arabic alphabet, informal Romanised Urdu is less eccentric than informal Romanised Arabic. Informal Romanised Urdu does not use numerals, and rarely uses mixed case, because the Arabic letters that lack a clear equivalent in the English Latin alphabet (e.g. ء ع ذ ص ض ط ظ) are often silent in Urdu or pronounced identically to other letters (e.g. ت س ز). So, this system of Urdu Romanisation is used in some slightly more formal contexts than informal Romanised Arabic.

One example is the word عورت, ʿaurat. Formal transliterations often include a punctuation mark (') or special character (ʻ) for the ayn ع but this is omitted in informal romanisation. Adding the special characters makes it harder to type and would cause things such as Twitter hashtags to break. The discussion on social media about these events is often in informal Romanised Urdu, with frequent code-switching between Urdu and English, but the handwritten or expertly typeset signs at the events are mostly in either English, Urdu in the traditional script, or local languages.

| Letter | Nasta‘liq | Name of letter | Informal transcription | IPA |
|---|---|---|---|---|
| ا | ا | alif | a | /aː/ |
| ب | ب | be | b | /b/ |
| پ | پ | pe | p | /p/ |
| ت | ت | te | t | /t̪/ |
| ٹ | ٹ | ṭe | t | /ʈ/ |
| ث | ث | se | s | /s/ |
| ج | ج | jīm | j | /d͡ʒ/ |
| چ | چ | ce | ch | /t͡ʃ/ |
| ح | ح | baṛī he | h | /h/ |
| خ | خ | k͟he | kh | /x/ |
| د | د | dāl | d | /d̪/ |
| ڈ | ڈ | ḍāl | d | /ɖ/ |
| ذ | ذ | zāl | z | /z/ |
| ر | ر | re | r | /r/ |
| ڑ | ڑ | ṛe | ṛ | /ɽ/ |
| ز | ز | ze | z | /z/ |
| ژ | ژ | zhe | zh | /ʒ/ |
| س | س | sīn | s | /s/ |
| ش | ش | śīn | sh | /ʃ/ |
| ص | ص | ṣu’ād | s | /s/ |
| ض | ض | z̤ād | z | /z/ |
| ط | ط | to'e | t | /t/ |
| ظ | ظ | ẓo'e | z | /z/ |
| ع | ع | ʿain | ' or ‘ | /ʔ/ |
| غ | غ | ġain | gh | /ɣ/ |
| ف | ف | fe | f | /f/ |
| ق | ق | qāf | q | /q/ |
| ک | ک | kāf | k | /k/ |
| گ | گ | gāf | g | /ɡ/ |
| ل | ل | lām | l | /l/ |
| م | م | mīm | m | /m/ |
| ن | ن | nūn | n | /n/ |
| و | و | vā'o | v/w, o, au or ū | /ʋ/, /oː/, /ɔ/ or /uː/ |
| ہ, ﮩ, ﮨ | ہ | choṭī he | h | /h/ |
| ھ | ھ | do chashmī he | h | /ʰ/ |
| ء | ء | hamza | ' | /ʔ/ |
| ی | ی | ye | y, i | /j/ or /iː/ |
| ے | ے | bari ye | e or ai | /eː/ or /ɛː/ |

== See also ==
- Uddin and Begum Hindustani Romanisation

== Bibliography ==
- Dua, Hans R. (1994b). Urdu. In Asher (Ed.) (pp. 4863–4864).
- Insha, Ibn e. (2002) Urdu Ki Aakhri Kitab. New Delhi: Kitab Wala. ISBN 81-85738-57-2.
- B.S.I. Kita'b I Muqaddas. Bangalore: The Bible Society of India, 1994. ISBN 81-221-3230-8.
- Gupta, Sunil (2022). The Dictionary of Urdu Poetry. Gurgaon: Zorba Books. ISBN 97-893-9302-9-13-3.
