= Devanagari Braille =

Braille used in India and Nepal

Devanagari Braille Nagari Braille
- Script type: Alphabet
- Print basis: Devanagari
- Languages: Hindi, Marathi, Nepali

Related scripts
- Parent systems: Night writing: Braille; English Braille; Bharati Braille; Devanagari Braille

Similar braille conventions are used for three languages of India and Nepal that in print are written in Devanagari script: Hindi, Marathi, and Nepali. These are part of a family of related braille alphabets known as Bharati Braille. There are apparently some differences between the Nepali braille alphabet of India and that of Nepal.

== System ==
Although basically alphabetic, Devanagari Braille retains one aspect of Indian abugidas, in that the default vowel a is not written unless it occurs at the beginning of a word or before a vowel. For example, braille ⠅ (the consonant K) renders print क ka, and braille ⠹ (TH), print थ tha. To indicate that a consonant is not followed by a vowel (as when followed by another consonant, or at the end of a syllable), a halant (vowel-cancelling) prefix is used: ⠈⠅ (∅–K) is क् k, and ⠈⠹ (∅–TH) is थ् th. (When writing in Hindi, the halant is generally omitted at the end of a word, following the convention in print.) However, unlike in an abugida, there are no vowel diacritics in Devanagari Braille: Vowels are written with full letters following the consonant regardless of their order in print. For example, in print the vowel i is prefixed to a consonant in a reduced diacritic form, कि ki, but in braille it follows in its full form: ⠅⠊ (K–I), equivalent to writing ⟨कइ⟩ for ki in print. Thus क्लिक klika is written in braille as ⠈⠅⠇⠊⠅ (∅–K–L–I–K). The one time when a non-initial a is written in braille is when it is followed by another vowel. In this environment, the a must be written to indicate that it exists, as otherwise the subsequent vowel will be read as following the consonant immediately. Thus a true ⟨कइ⟩ kai in print is rendered in braille as ⠅⠁⠊ (K–A–I).

Apart from kṣ and jñ, which each have their own braille letter, Devanagari Braille does not handle conjuncts. Print conjuncts are rendered instead with the halant in braille. Devanagari braille is thus equivalent to Grade-1 English braille, though there are plans to extend it to conjuncts.

== Alphabet ==
Print	अ	आ	इ	ई	उ	ऊ	ऎ	ए	ऐ	ऒ	ओ	औ
ISO	a	ā	i	ī	u	ū	e	ē	ai	o	ō	au
Braille	⠁ (braille pattern dots-1)	⠜ (braille pattern dots-345)	⠊ (braille pattern dots-24)	⠔ (braille pattern dots-35)	⠥ (braille pattern dots-136)	⠳ (braille pattern dots-1256)	⠢ (braille pattern dots-26)	⠑ (braille pattern dots-15)	⠌ (braille pattern dots-34)	⠭ (braille pattern dots-1346)	⠕ (braille pattern dots-135)	⠪ (braille pattern dots-246)

Print	क	ख	ग	घ	ङ	च	छ	ज	झ	ञ
ISO	k	kh	g	gh	ṅ	ch	chh	j	jh	ñ
Braille	⠅ (braille pattern dots-13)	⠨ (braille pattern dots-46)	⠛ (braille pattern dots-1245)	⠣ (braille pattern dots-126)	⠬ (braille pattern dots-346)	⠉ (braille pattern dots-14)	⠡ (braille pattern dots-16)	⠚ (braille pattern dots-245)	⠴ (braille pattern dots-356)	⠒ (braille pattern dots-25)

Print	ट	ठ	ड	ढ	ण	त	थ	द	ध	न
ISO	ṭ	ṭh	ḍ	ḍh	ṇ	t	th	d	dh	n
Braille	⠾ (braille pattern dots-23456)	⠺ (braille pattern dots-2456)	⠫ (braille pattern dots-1246)	⠿ (braille pattern dots-123456)	⠼ (braille pattern dots-3456)	⠞ (braille pattern dots-2345)	⠹ (braille pattern dots-1456)	⠙ (braille pattern dots-145)	⠮ (braille pattern dots-2346)	⠝ (braille pattern dots-1345)

Print	प	फ	ब	भ	म	य	र	ल	व
ISO	p	ph	b	bh	m	y	r	l	v
Braille	⠏ (braille pattern dots-1234)	⠖ (braille pattern dots-235)	⠃ (braille pattern dots-12)	⠘ (braille pattern dots-45)	⠍ (braille pattern dots-134)	⠽ (braille pattern dots-13456)	⠗ (braille pattern dots-1235)	⠇ (braille pattern dots-123)	⠧ (braille pattern dots-1236)

Print	श	ष	स	ह	ळ	क्ष	ज्ञ	ड़	फ़	ज़
ISO	ś	ṣ	s	h	ḷ	kṣ	jñ	ṛ	f	z
Braille	⠩ (braille pattern dots-146)	⠯ (braille pattern dots-12346)	⠎ (braille pattern dots-234)	⠓ (braille pattern dots-125)	⠸ (braille pattern dots-456)	⠟ (braille pattern dots-12345)	⠱ (braille pattern dots-156)	⠻ (braille pattern dots-12456)	⠋ (braille pattern dots-124)	⠵ (braille pattern dots-1356)

Not all of the letters used for Sanskrit are reported for Nepali in Nepal.

=== Codas ===
Diacritic (on क)	क्	कं	कः	कँ	कऽ
Diacritic (on क)	Halant	Anusvara	Visarga	Candrabindu	Avagraha
Braille	⠈ (braille pattern dots-4)	⠰ (braille pattern dots-56)	⠠ (braille pattern dots-6)	⠄ (braille pattern dots-3)	⠂ (braille pattern dots-2)

=== Pointing ===
The Bharati point, ⠐, is used to derive the syllabic consonants. Long syllabic consonants are prefixed by point-6, which also transcribes the visarga.

Print	ऋ	ॠ	ऌ	ॡ	ढ़
ISO	r̥	r̥̄	l̥	l̥̄	ṛh
Braille	⠐ (braille pattern dots-5) ⠗ (braille pattern dots-1235)	⠠ (braille pattern dots-6) ⠗ (braille pattern dots-1235)	⠐ (braille pattern dots-5) ⠇ (braille pattern dots-123)	⠠ (braille pattern dots-6) ⠇ (braille pattern dots-123)	⠐ (braille pattern dots-5) ⠻ (braille pattern dots-12456)

The pointing diacritic is also used for consonants that are derived with a point in print. Most of these consonants were introduced from Persian:

Print	क़	ख़	ग़	श़ or झ़
ISO	qa	xa	ġa	ža
Braille	⠐ (braille pattern dots-5) ⠅ (braille pattern dots-13)	⠐ (braille pattern dots-5) ⠨ (braille pattern dots-46)	⠐ (braille pattern dots-5) ⠛ (braille pattern dots-1245)	or

There are irregularities, however. फ़ f and ज़ z, which are found in both Persian and English loans, are transcribed with English Braille (and international) ⠋ and ⠵, as shown in the chart in the previous section, while the internal allophonic developments of ड़ ṛ and ढ़ ṛh are respectively an independent letter ⠻ in braille and a derivation from that letter rather than from the base letter in print.

This is also where, at least according to UNESCO (2013), Hindi Braille and Indian Urdu Braille diverge. Urdu Braille has several additional derivations along these lines, which are not possible in print Devanagari. In Urdu Braille, ⠭ and ⠟ are assigned their English/international values of x and q, replacing ⠐⠅ and ⠐⠨. Also, ⠱ jñ is used for ح ḥ, and ⠷ (not found in Devanagari Braille) is used for ع ʿ, a role played by the letter अ in Devanagari Urdu but not found in Hindi.

== Nepali punctuation ==
Braille as used in Nepal has some mostly minor differences from that used for Nepali in India. This may extend to punctuation. The asterisk in Nepal, ⠐⠔, differs from the ⠔⠔ used in India, unless this is a copy error in UNESCO (2013). Single quotation marks and additional brackets are noted for Nepal but not for India:

Print	‘ ... ’	[ ... ]	{ ... }
Braille	...	...	...

These differ from the same punctuation in Bangladesh.

== Text ==
The following is the sample text in the Hindi article, of Article 1 of the Universal Declaration of Human Rights:

⠁⠝⠥⠈⠉⠡⠑⠙⠀⠼⠁⠀⠤⠤⠀⠎⠘⠔⠀⠍⠝⠥⠈⠯⠽⠕⠰⠀⠅⠕⠀⠛⠪⠗⠧⠀⠪⠗⠀⠁⠮⠊⠅⠜⠗⠕⠰⠀⠅⠑⠀⠍⠜⠈⠍⠇⠑⠀⠍⠑⠰⠀⠚⠈⠝⠍⠚⠜⠞⠀⠈⠎⠧⠞⠈⠝⠈⠞⠗⠞⠜⠀⠪⠗⠀⠎⠍⠜⠈⠝⠞⠜⠀⠈⠏⠗⠜⠈⠏⠞⠀⠓⠌⠰⠲
⠥⠈⠝⠓⠑⠰⠀⠃⠥⠈⠙⠮⠊⠀⠪⠗⠀⠁⠈⠝⠞⠗⠜⠈⠞⠍⠜⠀⠅⠔⠀⠙⠑⠝⠀⠈⠏⠗⠜⠈⠏⠞⠀⠓⠌⠀⠪⠗⠀⠏⠗⠈⠎⠏⠗⠀⠥⠈⠝⠓⠑⠰⠀⠘⠜⠔⠉⠜⠗⠑⠀⠅⠑⠀⠘⠜⠧⠀⠎⠑⠀⠃⠈⠗⠞⠜⠧⠀⠅⠈⠗⠝⠜⠀⠉⠜⠓⠊⠽⠑⠲⠀
अनुच्छेद १ — सभी मनुष्यों को गौरव और अधिकारों के मामले में जन्मजात स्वतन्त्रता और समानता प्राप्त हैं।
उन्हें बुद्धि और अन्तरात्मा की देन प्राप्त है और परस्पर उन्हें भाईचारे के भाव से बर्ताव करना चाहिये।
Anucched 1 — Sabhī manuṣyoṃ ko gaurav aur adhikāroṃ ke māmle meṃ janmajāt svatantratā aur samāntā prāpt haiṃ.
Unheṃ buddhi aur antarātmā kī den prāpt hai aur paraspar unheṃ bhāīcāre ke bhāv se bartāv karnā cāhiye.

== See also ==
- Bharati braille
- Urdu Braille
