= Arabic Presentation Forms-A =

Unicode character block

- Range: U+FB50..U+FDFF (688 code points)
- Plane: BMP
- Scripts: Arabic (654 char.); Common (2 char.)
- Major alphabets: Central Asian languages Pashto; Persian; Kurdish; Sindhi; Urdu
- Symbol sets: contextual forms multi-letter and word ligatures
- Assigned: 656 code points
- Unused: 0 reserved code points 32 non-characters

Unicode Version History
- 1.1 (1993): 593 (+593)
- 3.2 (2002): 594 (+1)
- 4.0 (2003): 595 (+1)
- 6.0 (2010): 611 (+16)
- 14.0 (2021): 631 (+20)
- 17.0 (2025): 656 (+25)

Unicode documentation
- Code chart ∣ Web page
- Note: This range was initially part of the Private Use Area in Unicode 1.0.0, and removed from it in Unicode 1.0.1.

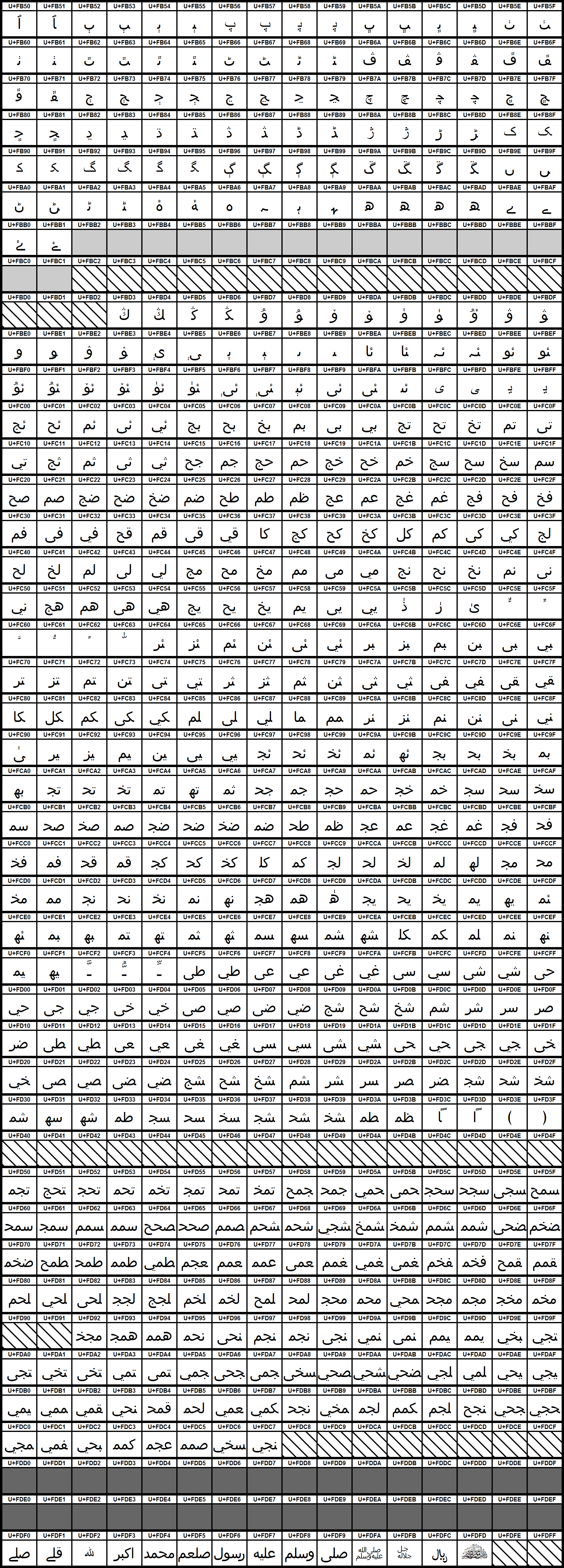
Graphical representation of the Arabic Presentation Forms-A Unicode block

Arabic Presentation Forms-A is a Unicode block encoding contextual forms and ligatures of letter variants needed for Persian, Urdu, Sindhi and Central Asian languages. This block also allocates 32 noncharacters in Unicode, designed specifically for internal use.

The presentation forms are present only for compatibility with older standards such as codepage 864 used in DOS, and are typically used in visual and not logical order. It has been agreed no further presentation forms will be encoded; though the block still sees further encodings including a contiguous range of 32 noncharacters.

== Block ==
Arabic Presentation Forms-A^{[1]}^{[2]} Official Unicode Consortium code chart (PDF)
| | 0 | 1 | 2 | 3 | 4 | 5 | 6 | 7 | 8 | 9 | A | B | C | D | E | F |
| U+FB5x | ﭐ | ﭑ | ﭒ | ﭓ | ﭔ | ﭕ | ﭖ | ﭗ | ﭘ | ﭙ | ﭚ | ﭛ | ﭜ | ﭝ | ﭞ | ﭟ |
| U+FB6x | ﭠ | ﭡ | ﭢ | ﭣ | ﭤ | ﭥ | ﭦ | ﭧ | ﭨ | ﭩ | ﭪ | ﭫ | ﭬ | ﭭ | ﭮ | ﭯ |
| U+FB7x | ﭰ | ﭱ | ﭲ | ﭳ | ﭴ | ﭵ | ﭶ | ﭷ | ﭸ | ﭹ | ﭺ | ﭻ | ﭼ | ﭽ | ﭾ | ﭿ |
| U+FB8x | ﮀ | ﮁ | ﮂ | ﮃ | ﮄ | ﮅ | ﮆ | ﮇ | ﮈ | ﮉ | ﮊ | ﮋ | ﮌ | ﮍ | ﮎ | ﮏ |
| U+FB9x | ﮐ | ﮑ | ﮒ | ﮓ | ﮔ | ﮕ | ﮖ | ﮗ | ﮘ | ﮙ | ﮚ | ﮛ | ﮜ | ﮝ | ﮞ | ﮟ |
| U+FBAx | ﮠ | ﮡ | ﮢ | ﮣ | ﮤ | ﮥ | ﮦ | ﮧ | ﮨ | ﮩ | ﮪ | ﮫ | ﮬ | ﮭ | ﮮ | ﮯ |
| U+FBBx | ﮰ | ﮱ | ﮲ | ﮳ | ﮴ | ﮵ | ﮶ | ﮷ | ﮸ | ﮹ | ﮺ | ﮻ | ﮼ | ﮽ | ﮾ | ﮿ |
| U+FBCx | ﯀ | ﯁ | ﯂ | ﯃ | ﯄ | ﯅ | ﯆ | ﯇ | ﯈ | ﯉ | ﯊ | ﯋ | ﯌ | ﯍ | ﯎ | ﯏ |
| U+FBDx | ﯐ | ﯑ | ﯒ | ﯓ | ﯔ | ﯕ | ﯖ | ﯗ | ﯘ | ﯙ | ﯚ | ﯛ | ﯜ | ﯝ | ﯞ | ﯟ |
| U+FBEx | ﯠ | ﯡ | ﯢ | ﯣ | ﯤ | ﯥ | ﯦ | ﯧ | ﯨ | ﯩ | ﯪ | ﯫ | ﯬ | ﯭ | ﯮ | ﯯ |
| U+FBFx | ﯰ | ﯱ | ﯲ | ﯳ | ﯴ | ﯵ | ﯶ | ﯷ | ﯸ | ﯹ | ﯺ | ﯻ | ﯼ | ﯽ | ﯾ | ﯿ |
| U+FC0x | ﰀ | ﰁ | ﰂ | ﰃ | ﰄ | ﰅ | ﰆ | ﰇ | ﰈ | ﰉ | ﰊ | ﰋ | ﰌ | ﰍ | ﰎ | ﰏ |
| U+FC1x | ﰐ | ﰑ | ﰒ | ﰓ | ﰔ | ﰕ | ﰖ | ﰗ | ﰘ | ﰙ | ﰚ | ﰛ | ﰜ | ﰝ | ﰞ | ﰟ |
| U+FC2x | ﰠ | ﰡ | ﰢ | ﰣ | ﰤ | ﰥ | ﰦ | ﰧ | ﰨ | ﰩ | ﰪ | ﰫ | ﰬ | ﰭ | ﰮ | ﰯ |
| U+FC3x | ﰰ | ﰱ | ﰲ | ﰳ | ﰴ | ﰵ | ﰶ | ﰷ | ﰸ | ﰹ | ﰺ | ﰻ | ﰼ | ﰽ | ﰾ | ﰿ |
| U+FC4x | ﱀ | ﱁ | ﱂ | ﱃ | ﱄ | ﱅ | ﱆ | ﱇ | ﱈ | ﱉ | ﱊ | ﱋ | ﱌ | ﱍ | ﱎ | ﱏ |
| U+FC5x | ﱐ | ﱑ | ﱒ | ﱓ | ﱔ | ﱕ | ﱖ | ﱗ | ﱘ | ﱙ | ﱚ | ﱛ | ﱜ | ﱝ | ﱞ | ﱟ |
| U+FC6x | ﱠ | ﱡ | ﱢ | ﱣ | ﱤ | ﱥ | ﱦ | ﱧ | ﱨ | ﱩ | ﱪ | ﱫ | ﱬ | ﱭ | ﱮ | ﱯ |
| U+FC7x | ﱰ | ﱱ | ﱲ | ﱳ | ﱴ | ﱵ | ﱶ | ﱷ | ﱸ | ﱹ | ﱺ | ﱻ | ﱼ | ﱽ | ﱾ | ﱿ |
| U+FC8x | ﲀ | ﲁ | ﲂ | ﲃ | ﲄ | ﲅ | ﲆ | ﲇ | ﲈ | ﲉ | ﲊ | ﲋ | ﲌ | ﲍ | ﲎ | ﲏ |
| U+FC9x | ﲐ | ﲑ | ﲒ | ﲓ | ﲔ | ﲕ | ﲖ | ﲗ | ﲘ | ﲙ | ﲚ | ﲛ | ﲜ | ﲝ | ﲞ | ﲟ |
| U+FCAx | ﲠ | ﲡ | ﲢ | ﲣ | ﲤ | ﲥ | ﲦ | ﲧ | ﲨ | ﲩ | ﲪ | ﲫ | ﲬ | ﲭ | ﲮ | ﲯ |
| U+FCBx | ﲰ | ﲱ | ﲲ | ﲳ | ﲴ | ﲵ | ﲶ | ﲷ | ﲸ | ﲹ | ﲺ | ﲻ | ﲼ | ﲽ | ﲾ | ﲿ |
| U+FCCx | ﳀ | ﳁ | ﳂ | ﳃ | ﳄ | ﳅ | ﳆ | ﳇ | ﳈ | ﳉ | ﳊ | ﳋ | ﳌ | ﳍ | ﳎ | ﳏ |
| U+FCDx | ﳐ | ﳑ | ﳒ | ﳓ | ﳔ | ﳕ | ﳖ | ﳗ | ﳘ | ﳙ | ﳚ | ﳛ | ﳜ | ﳝ | ﳞ | ﳟ |
| U+FCEx | ﳠ | ﳡ | ﳢ | ﳣ | ﳤ | ﳥ | ﳦ | ﳧ | ﳨ | ﳩ | ﳪ | ﳫ | ﳬ | ﳭ | ﳮ | ﳯ |
| U+FCFx | ﳰ | ﳱ | ﳲ | ﳳ | ﳴ | ﳵ | ﳶ | ﳷ | ﳸ | ﳹ | ﳺ | ﳻ | ﳼ | ﳽ | ﳾ | ﳿ |
| U+FD0x | ﴀ | ﴁ | ﴂ | ﴃ | ﴄ | ﴅ | ﴆ | ﴇ | ﴈ | ﴉ | ﴊ | ﴋ | ﴌ | ﴍ | ﴎ | ﴏ |
| U+FD1x | ﴐ | ﴑ | ﴒ | ﴓ | ﴔ | ﴕ | ﴖ | ﴗ | ﴘ | ﴙ | ﴚ | ﴛ | ﴜ | ﴝ | ﴞ | ﴟ |
| U+FD2x | ﴠ | ﴡ | ﴢ | ﴣ | ﴤ | ﴥ | ﴦ | ﴧ | ﴨ | ﴩ | ﴪ | ﴫ | ﴬ | ﴭ | ﴮ | ﴯ |
| U+FD3x | ﴰ | ﴱ | ﴲ | ﴳ | ﴴ | ﴵ | ﴶ | ﴷ | ﴸ | ﴹ | ﴺ | ﴻ | ﴼ | ﴽ | ﴾ | ﴿ |
| U+FD4x | ﵀ | ﵁ | ﵂ | ﵃ | ﵄ | ﵅ | ﵆ | ﵇ | ﵈ | ﵉ | ﵊ | ﵋ | ﵌ | ﵍ | ﵎ | ﵏ |
| U+FD5x | ﵐ | ﵑ | ﵒ | ﵓ | ﵔ | ﵕ | ﵖ | ﵗ | ﵘ | ﵙ | ﵚ | ﵛ | ﵜ | ﵝ | ﵞ | ﵟ |
| U+FD6x | ﵠ | ﵡ | ﵢ | ﵣ | ﵤ | ﵥ | ﵦ | ﵧ | ﵨ | ﵩ | ﵪ | ﵫ | ﵬ | ﵭ | ﵮ | ﵯ |
| U+FD7x | ﵰ | ﵱ | ﵲ | ﵳ | ﵴ | ﵵ | ﵶ | ﵷ | ﵸ | ﵹ | ﵺ | ﵻ | ﵼ | ﵽ | ﵾ | ﵿ |
| U+FD8x | ﶀ | ﶁ | ﶂ | ﶃ | ﶄ | ﶅ | ﶆ | ﶇ | ﶈ | ﶉ | ﶊ | ﶋ | ﶌ | ﶍ | ﶎ | ﶏ |
| U+FD9x | ﶐ | ﶑ | ﶒ | ﶓ | ﶔ | ﶕ | ﶖ | ﶗ | ﶘ | ﶙ | ﶚ | ﶛ | ﶜ | ﶝ | ﶞ | ﶟ |
| U+FDAx | ﶠ | ﶡ | ﶢ | ﶣ | ﶤ | ﶥ | ﶦ | ﶧ | ﶨ | ﶩ | ﶪ | ﶫ | ﶬ | ﶭ | ﶮ | ﶯ |
| U+FDBx | ﶰ | ﶱ | ﶲ | ﶳ | ﶴ | ﶵ | ﶶ | ﶷ | ﶸ | ﶹ | ﶺ | ﶻ | ﶼ | ﶽ | ﶾ | ﶿ |
| U+FDCx | ﷀ | ﷁ | ﷂ | ﷃ | ﷄ | ﷅ | ﷆ | ﷇ | ﷈ | ﷉ | ﷊ | ﷋ | ﷌ | ﷍ | ﷎ | ﷏ |
| U+FDDx | | | | | | | | | | | | | | | | |
| U+FDEx | | | | | | | | | | | | | | | | |
| U+FDFx | ﷰ | ﷱ | ﷲ | ﷳ | ﷴ | ﷵ | ﷶ | ﷷ | ﷸ | ﷹ | ﷺ | ﷻ | ﷼ | ﷽ | ﷾ | ﷿ |
Notes 1.As of Unicode version 18.0 2.Black areas indicate noncharacters (code points that are guaranteed never to be assigned as encoded characters in the Unicode Standard)

== History ==
The following Unicode-related documents record the purpose and process of defining specific characters in the Arabic Presentation Forms-A block:

| Version | Final code points (Note: Proposed code points and characters names may differ from final code points and names) | Count | L2 ID | WG2 ID | Document |
|---|---|---|---|---|---|
| 1.1 | U+FB50..FBB1, FBD3..FD3F, FD50..FD8F, FD92..FDC7, FDF0..FDFB | 593 | | | (to be determined) |
| 1.1 | U+FB50..FBB1, FBD3..FD3F, FD50..FD8F, FD92..FDC7, FDF0..FDFB | 593 | L2/06-008R2 | | Moore, Lisa (2006-02-13), "Motion 106-M3", UTC #106 Minutes, "Drop U+FD3E ORNATE LEFT PARENTHESIS and U+FD3F ORNATE RIGHT PARENTHESIS from the list of characters with Bidi Mirrored property proposed in Public Review Issue 80." |
| 1.1 | U+FB50..FBB1, FBD3..FD3F, FD50..FD8F, FD92..FDC7, FDF0..FDFB | 593 | L2/14-026 | | Moore, Lisa (2014-02-17), "Consensus 138-C21", UTC #138 Minutes, "Change the General Category and linebreak properties of U+FD3E LEFT ORNATE PARENTHESIS to gc=Pe and lb=CL; and change General Category and linebreak properties of U+FD3F RIGHT ORNATE PARENTHESIS to gc=Ps and lb=OP, in Unicode 7.0." |
| 1.1 | U+FB50..FBB1, FBD3..FD3F, FD50..FD8F, FD92..FDC7, FDF0..FDFB | 593 | L2/20-289 | N5155 | Evans, Lorna Priest (2020-12-07), Request for glyph changes and annotations for Kazakh, Kyrgyz, and Uyghur [Affects U+FBD7-FBD8, U+FBDD, and U+FBE0-FBE1] |
| 1.1 | U+FB50..FBB1, FBD3..FD3F, FD50..FD8F, FD92..FDC7, FDF0..FDFB | 593 | L2/21-016R | | Anderson, Deborah; Whistler, Ken; Pournader, Roozbeh; Moore, Lisa; Liang, Hai (2021-01-14), "11a. Glyph changes and annotations for Kazakh, Kyrgyz, and Uyghur", Recommendations to UTC #166 January 2021 on Script Proposals |
| 1.1 | U+FB50..FBB1, FBD3..FD3F, FD50..FD8F, FD92..FDC7, FDF0..FDFB | 593 | L2/21-009 | | Moore, Lisa (2021-01-27), "B.1 — 11a", UTC #166 Minutes |
| 3.1 | U+FDD0..FDEF | 32 | L2/00-187 | | Moore, Lisa (2000-08-23), "Not a Character", UTC minutes -- Boston, August 8-11, 2000 |
| 3.1 | U+FDD0..FDEF | 32 | L2/00-341 | N2277 | Addition of reserved characters for internal processing uses, 2000-09-19 |
| 3.1 | U+FDD0..FDEF | 32 | L2/01-050 | N2253 | Umamaheswaran, V. S. (2001-01-21), "7.20 Proposal for Reserved Positions for Processing Purposes", Minutes of the SC2/WG2 meeting in Athens, September 2000 |
| 3.2 | U+FDFC | 1 | L2/01-148R | | Pournader, Roozbeh (2001-04-07), Proposal: Arabic Ligature Rial |
| 3.2 | U+FDFC | 1 | L2/01-184R | | Moore, Lisa (2001-06-18), "Motion 87-M6", Minutes from the UTC/L2 meeting |
| 3.2 | U+FDFC | 1 | L2/01-354 | N2373 | Pournader, Roozbeh (2001-09-20), Proposal: Arabic Currency Sign Rial |
| 3.2 | U+FDFC | 1 | L2/02-154 | N2403 | Umamaheswaran, V. S. (2002-04-22), "7.8", Draft minutes of WG 2 meeting 41, Hotel Phoenix, Singapore, 2001-10-15/19 |
| 4.0 | U+FDFD | 1 | L2/02-005 | | Hussain, Sarmad; Afzal, Muhammad (2001-12-18), Urdu Computing Standards (Charts and Exhibits) |
| 4.0 | U+FDFD | 1 | L2/02-006 (pdf, doc) | N2413-1 | Zia, Khaver (2002-01-10), Towards Unicode Standard for Urdu |
| 4.0 | U+FDFD | 1 | L2/02-003 | N2413-2 | Afzal, Muhammad; Hussain, Sarmad (2001-12-28), Urdu Computing Standards: Development of Urdu Zabta Takhti (UZT) 1.01 |
| 4.0 | U+FDFD | 1 | L2/02-004 | N2413-3 | Hussain, Sarmad; Afzal, Muhammad (2001-12-28), Urdu Computing Standards: Urdu Zabta Takhti (UZT) 1.01 |
| 4.0 | U+FDFD | 1 | L2/02-163 | N2413-4 (pdf, doc) | Proposal to add Marks and Digits in Arabic Code Block (for Urdu), 2002-04-30 |
| 4.0 | U+FDFD | 1 | L2/02-011R | | Kew, Jonathan (2002-01-12), Comments on L2/02-006: Towards Unicode Standard for Urdu |
| 4.0 | U+FDFD | 1 | L2/02-197 | | Freytag, Asmus (2002-05-01), Urdu Feedback from Bidi Committee |
| 4.0 | U+FDFD | 1 | L2/02-166R2 | | Moore, Lisa (2002-08-09), "Motion 91-M3", UTC #91 Minutes |
| 4.0 | U+FDFD | 1 | L2/02-372 | N2453 (pdf, doc) | Umamaheswaran, V. S. (2002-10-30), "7.9 Urdu contribution", Unconfirmed minutes of WG 2 meeting 42 |
| 4.0 | U+FDFD | 1 | L2/02-466 | N2567 | Everson, Michael; Pournader, Roozbeh (2002-12-09), Towards resolution on the name of U+FDFD |
| 4.0 | U+FDFD | 1 | L2/02-467 | N2568 | Everson, Michael; Pournader, Roozbeh; Hussain, Sarmad; Afzal, Muhammad (2002-12-10), Consensus on the name of U+FDFD |
| 4.0 | U+FDFD | 1 | L2/04-196 | N2653 (pdf, doc) | Umamaheswaran, V. S. (2004-06-04), "a-3", Unconfirmed minutes of WG 2 meeting 44 |
| 6.0 | U+FBB2..FBC1 | 16 | L2/98-274 | | Davis, Mark; Mansour, Kamal (1998-07-28), Proposed Arabic Script Additions for Minority Languages |
| 6.0 | U+FBB2..FBC1 | 16 | L2/98-409 | | Davis, Mark; Mansour, Kamal (1998-12-01), Proposal to add 25 Arabic characters to the BMP |
| 6.0 | U+FBB2..FBC1 | 16 | L2/98-419 (pdf, doc) | | Aliprand, Joan (1999-02-05), "Additional Arabic characters", Approved Minutes -- UTC #78 & NCITS Subgroup L2 # 175 Joint Meeting, San Jose, CA -- December 1-4, 1998 |
| 6.0 | U+FBB2..FBC1 | 16 | L2/02-021 | | Davis, Mark; Mansour, Kamal (2002-01-17), Proposal To Amend Arabic repertoire |
| 6.0 | U+FBB2..FBC1 | 16 | L2/03-154 | | Kew, Jonathan; Mansour, Kamal; Davis, Mark (2003-05-16), Proposal to encode productive Arabic-script modifier marks |
| 6.0 | U+FBB2..FBC1 | 16 | L2/06-039 | N3460-A | Durrani, Attash (2006-01-29), Preliminary Proposal to add Nuqta Characters to Arabic Block |
| 6.0 | U+FBB2..FBC1 | 16 | L2/06-240 | | Kew, Jonathan (2006-07-19), Letter to Dr. Durrani |
| 6.0 | U+FBB2..FBC1 | 16 | L2/06-322 | | Durrani, Attash (2006-10-04), Letter to Jonathan Kew re Nuqtas |
| 6.0 | U+FBB2..FBC1 | 16 | L2/07-094 | | Durrani, Attash (2007-04-03), Regarding Nuqta Characters |
| 6.0 | U+FBB2..FBC1 | 16 | L2/07-174 | | Durrani, Attash (2007-05-14), The Case Folding Solution for the Arabic Script |
| 6.0 | U+FBB2..FBC1 | 16 | L2/08-159 | | Durrani, Attash; Mansour, Kamal; McGowan, Rick (2008-04-18), Proposal to Encode 22 Characters for Arabic Pedagogical Use |
| 6.0 | U+FBB2..FBC1 | 16 | L2/08-230 | | Anderson, Deborah (2008-05-23), Comments on Proposal to Encode 22 Characters for Arabic Pedagogical Use |
| 6.0 | U+FBB2..FBC1 | 16 | L2/08-159R | N3460R | Durrani, Attash; Mansour, Kamal; McGowan, Rick (2008-06-24), Proposal to Encode 16 Characters for Arabic Pedagogical Use |
| 6.0 | U+FBB2..FBC1 | 16 | L2/08-161R2 | | Moore, Lisa (2008-11-05), "Motion 115-M3", UTC #115 Minutes |
| 6.0 | U+FBB2..FBC1 | 16 | L2/08-412 | N3553 (pdf, doc) | Umamaheswaran, V. S. (2008-11-05), "M53.19", Unconfirmed minutes of WG 2 meeting 53 |
| 6.0 | U+FBB2..FBC1 | 16 | L2/08-361 | | Moore, Lisa (2008-12-02), "Consensus 117-C26", UTC #117 Minutes |
| 6.0 | U+FBB2..FBC1 | 16 | L2/09-011 | | Pournader, Roozbeh (2009-01-13), Consistent naming and better properties for Arabic Pedagogical Symbols |
| 6.0 | U+FBB2..FBC1 | 16 | L2/09-110 | N3606 | Pandey, Anshuman (2009-03-30), Proposal to Advance the Renaming of Arabic Pedagogical Symbols |
| 6.0 | U+FBB2..FBC1 | 16 | L2/09-234 | N3603 (pdf, doc) | Umamaheswaran, V. S. (2009-07-08), "M54.06a", Unconfirmed minutes of WG 2 meeting 54 |
| 6.0 | U+FBB2..FBC1 | 16 | L2/09-104 | | Moore, Lisa (2009-05-20), "Consensus 119-C25", UTC #119 / L2 #216 Minutes |
| 14.0 | U+FBC2 | 1 | L2/19-306 | N5142 | Pournader, Roozbeh; Anderson, Deborah (2019-09-29), Arabic additions for Quranic orthographies |
| 14.0 | U+FBC2 | 1 | L2/19-343 | | Anderson, Deborah; Whistler, Ken; Pournader, Roozbeh; Moore, Lisa; Liang, Hai (2019-10-06), "a. Additions for Quranic orthographiesFD4C:c. Arabic honorifics", Recommendations to UTC #161 October 2019 on Script Proposals |
| 14.0 | U+FBC2 | 1 | L2/19-323 | | Moore, Lisa (2019-10-01), "Consensus 161-C4", UTC #161 Minutes |
| 14.0 | U+FBC2 | 1 | L2/20-105 | | Anderson, Deborah; Whistler, Ken; Pournader, Roozbeh; Moore, Lisa; Constable, Peter; Liang, Hai (2020-04-20), "3f. Comments on L2/19-306", Recommendations to UTC #163 April 2020 on Script Proposals |
| 14.0 | U+FD40..FD4B, FDFE..FDFF | 14 | L2/14-147 | | Pournader, Roozbeh (2014-07-27), Proposal to encode seventeen Arabic honorifics |
| 14.0 | U+FD40..FD4B, FDFE..FDFF | 14 | L2/14-170 | | Anderson, Deborah; Whistler, Ken; McGowan, Rick; Pournader, Roozbeh; Iancu, Laurențiu (2014-07-28), "5. L2/14-147", Recommendations to UTC #140 August 2014 on Script Proposals |
| 14.0 | U+FD40..FD4B, FDFE..FDFF | 14 | L2/19-289R | | Pournader, Roozbeh; Jibaly, Mustafa (2019-07-26), Proposal to encode fourteen Arabic honorifics |
| 14.0 | U+FD40..FD4B, FDFE..FDFF | 14 | L2/19-270 | | Moore, Lisa (2019-10-07), "Consensus 160-C25", UTC #160 Minutes |
| 14.0 | U+FD4C..FD4D | 2 | L2/19-319 | | Pournader, Roozbeh; Jibaly, Mustafa (2019-09-29), Proposal to encode two more Arabic honorifics |
| 14.0 | U+FD4C..FD4D | 2 | L2/19-323 | | Moore, Lisa (2019-10-01), "Consensus 161-C3", UTC #161 Minutes |
| 14.0 | U+FD4E..FD4F | 2 | L2/20-042 | | Pournader, Roozbeh; Hooshdaran, Soheil; Jibaly, Mustafa (2020-01-15), Proposal to encode yet two more Arabic honorifics |
| 14.0 | U+FD4E..FD4F | 2 | L2/20-015R | | Moore, Lisa (2020-05-14), "C.5.3", Draft Minutes of UTC Meeting 162 |
| 14.0 | U+FDCF | 1 | L2/20-081 | | Pournader, Roozbeh; Evans, Lorna (2020-03-10), Proposal to encode an Arabic honorific used in Christian texts |
| 14.0 | U+FDCF | 1 | L2/20-105 | | Anderson, Deborah; Whistler, Ken; Pournader, Roozbeh; Moore, Lisa; Constable, Peter; Liang, Hai (2020-04-20), "3a. Arabic Honorific", Recommendations to UTC #163 April 2020 on Script Proposals |
| 14.0 | U+FDCF | 1 | L2/20-102 | | Moore, Lisa (2020-05-06), "Consensus 163-C13", UTC #163 Minutes |
| 17.0 | U+FBC3..FBD2, FD91 | 17 | L2/24-077 | | Pournader, Roozbeh; Sh., Rikza F.; Moslehi, Amir Mahdi (2024-03-18), Proposal to encode twenty-five more Arabic honorifics |
| 17.0 | U+FBC3..FBD2, FD91 | 17 | L2/24-068 | | Anderson, Deborah; Goregaokar, Manish; Kučera, Jan; Whistler, Ken; Pournader, Roozbeh; Constable, Peter (2024-04-18), "4c Twenty-five more honorifics", Recommendations to UTC #179 April 2024 on Script Proposals |
| 17.0 | U+FBC3..FBD2, FD91 | 17 | L2/24-061 | | Constable, Peter (2024-04-29), "Consensus 179-C49", UTC #179 Minutes, "Provisionally assign 25 Arabic code points" |
| 17.0 | U+FBC3..FBD2, FD91 | 17 | L2/24-166 | | Anderson, Deborah; Goregaokar, Manish; Kučera, Jan; Whistler, Ken; Pournader, Roozbeh; Constable, Peter (2024-07-18), "3c Misspellings in some honorific character names", Recommendations to UTC #180 July 2024 on Script Proposals |
| 17.0 | U+FBC3..FBD2, FD91 | 17 | L2/24-159 | | Constable, Peter (2024-07-29), "3c Misspellings in some honorific character names", UTC #180 Minutes |
| 17.0 | U+FD90, FDC8..FDCE | 8 | L2/24-002 | | Pournader, Roozbeh; Sh., Rikza F.; Moslehi, Amir Mahdi (2023-11-03), Proposal to encode eight more Arabic honorifics |
| 17.0 | U+FD90, FDC8..FDCE | 8 | L2/24-013R | | Anderson, Deborah; Goregaokar, Manish; Kučera, Jan; Whistler, Ken; Pournader, Roozbeh; Constable, Peter (2024-01-22), "3a Eight More Honorifics", Recommendations to UTC #178 January 2024 on Script Proposals |
| 17.0 | U+FD90, FDC8..FDCE | 8 | L2/24-006 | | Constable, Peter (2024-01-31), "Consensus 178-C16", UTC #178 Minutes |
