= Urdu keyboard =

Keyboard layout used for the Urdu alphabet

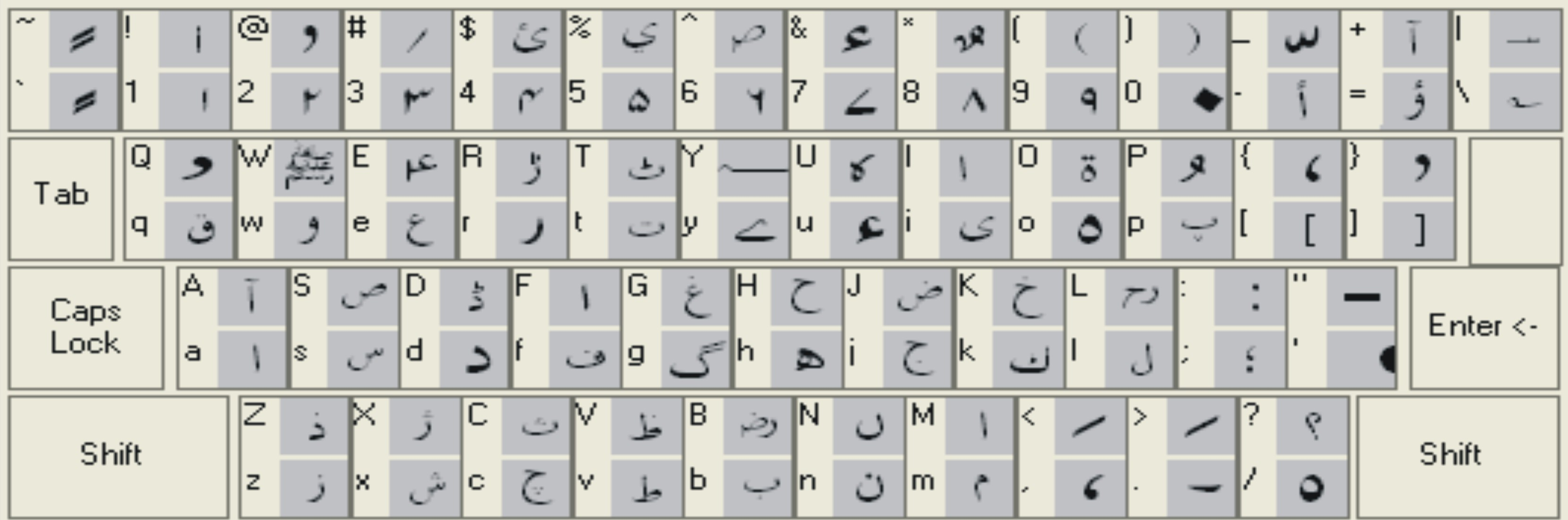
Urdu Keyboard layout

The Urdu keyboard is any keyboard layout for Urdu computer and typewriter keyboards. Since the first Urdu typewriter was made available in 1911, the layout has gone through various phases of evolution. With time, the variety of layouts introduced in the 1950s for mechanized compositions have reduced to very few that are compatible with the new digital age. Modern improvements in Urdu keyboard were pioneered by the National Language Authority (Muqtadra-e-Qaumi Zaban) in Pakistan, which standardized the linguistic aspects such as orthography and lexicography. These developments helped the keyboard layout to evolve from the typewriters to be compatible with computers, to increase the productivity and textual efficiency of the language, especially through modern electronic media.

== Evolution of the Urdu keyboard ==
When Urdu was declared as the national language of the independent Pakistan in 1947, a variety of keyboard designs were quickly brought into the market by various individuals and organizations. However, differences remained in the order of the keys and the number of characters. This highlighted an urgent need for a standard form of keyboard adaptable for diverse users.

=== Third generation ===
In 1980, the National Language Authority of Pakistan developed a new keyboard layout for typewriters based on Naskh script. The keyboard had 46 keys to type 71 Urdu consonants, vowels, diacritics, and punctuation marks, and 21 key symbols for arithmetic calculations and digits. However, with the arrival of the digital age, the layout became inadequate for computerized processing that required software backup to select the shape of the character appropriate to the context, and the ability to store multiple language character sets. These issues were addressed through the standardization of keyboard.

=== Fourth generation ===
In 1998 National Language Authority, under Dr. Attash Durrani's supervision started working on a research and development project to standardize the Urdu encoding. This resulted in the formation of Urdu Zabta Takhti (اردو ضابطہ تختی) (UZT). In July 2000, UZT 1.01 was standardized for all kinds of electronic computing, communications, and storage. Based on this version, Urdu language support was incorporated into the Versions 3.1 and 4.0 of Unicode. The Keyboard version 1 was finalized by NLA on December 14, 1999. In 2001, the National Database and Registration Authority of Pakistan fully adopted this keyboard for Data Entry operations of the Computerized National Identity Cards.

=== Phonetic Keyboard ===
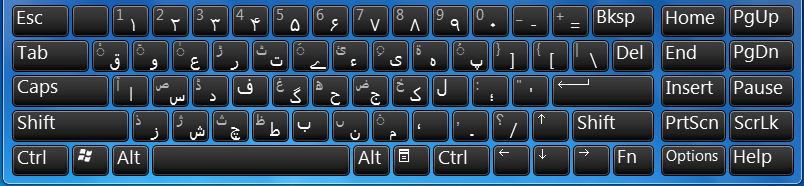
Layout of Urdu Phonetic Keyboard

Along with the UZT keyboards, phonetic keyboards have been developed for Urdu. Phonetic keyboards works with the sound of the words, e.g. 'a' button of the English keyboard contain an Urdu word which is similar to the sound of 'a' and same is the case for other characters. Though less common in the past, phonetic keyboards have seen wider use recently. CRULP (Center for Research for Urdu Language Processing) has been working on phonetic keyboard designs for Urdu and other local languages of Pakistan. Their Urdu Phonetic Keyboard Layout v1.1 for Windows is widely used and considered as a standard for typing Urdu on the Microsoft platform. However it has not been adopted by Microsoft for any Windows platform.

== See also ==
- Nasta'liq script
- Perso-Arabic script
- Urdu alphabet
- Urdu Informatics
- Urdu Wikipedia
