= Attash Durrani =

Pakistani linguist, researcher, critic, author, educationist and gemologist

Attash Durrani عطش درانی
- Born: Atta Ullah Khan; 22 January 1952; Montgomery, Punjab, Pakistan
- Died: 30 November 2018 (aged 66)
- Education: MA Urdu, MA Education, PhD
- Alma mater: University of the Punjab
- Occupations: Urdu writer, Researcher, Teacher, Educationist
- Spouse: Nasreen
- Children: M. Asad Zaman (son), Anita Ghazal Jujo (Granddaughter)
- Writing career
- Period: 1991 PhD
- Subjects: Urdu, Education
- Notable works: Ghost Characters Theory, Urdu MT & Computational Grammar, Urdu Istalahat Sazi, Lisani -0- Adabi Tehqeeq, Urdu Language Policy, Textbook Development
- Notable awards: Tamgha-e-Imtiaz, Sitara-e-Imtiaz

Attash Durrani (Urdu: عطش درانی; 22 January 1952 – 30 November 2018) was a Pakistani linguist, researcher, critic, author, educationist, and gemologist. He wrote more than 275 books and approximately 500 papers in Urdu and English. His main disciplines of study were language, education, computer science, and information technology. He was a recipient of the Tamgha-i-Imtiaz (lit. 'Medal of Excellence') and Sitara-e-Imtiaz (lit. 'Star of Excellence') medals for his contribution to Urdu language and literature.

== Early life ==
Durrani was born in Montgomery (now Sahiwal), Punjab. He received his PhD in Urdu terminology in 1991 from the University Oriental College, University of the Punjab, Lahore. He was a curriculum and textbook development specialist for Urdu, literacy, basic and at all the higher education levels and Urdu informatics for ADB, GIZ/GTZ, ESRA, JICA, UNESCO, US Aid, Islamabad, Pakistan and Curriculum Wing, Federal Ministry of Education, AIOU and Higher Education Commission of Pakistan (HEC). He has also shown interest in gemmology, writing books on Urdu jawaharat.

He also earned certificates in statistics, journalism, project management, research methodology and curriculum and text book development courses offered by the University of the Punjab, Institute of Education and Research, Lahore; Pakistan Planning and Management Institute (PPMI), Islamabad, University of Bradford (United Kingdom); COMSATS Institute of Information Technology, Islamabad, Pakistan; Project Management Institute (PMI) (US); National University of Science and Technology (NUST), Islamabad, Pakistan; and International Bureau of Education (IBE), UNESCO, Geneva. He supervised a number of MPhil, MS, PhD students on Urdu, Punjabi, Iqbaliat, Linguistics, Translatology, Education, Informatics, and Computer Science projects/theses.

== Career ==
Durrani wrote many books and articles in Urdu and English languages. His subjects were Urdu language and literature, linguistics, Education, literacy, curriculum and textbook development, Urdu Informatics, research, dictionaries; and terminologies, bibliographies and encyclopedias, and also Iqbal Studies, Pakistan Studies, Gemology, History and Philosophy of science.

He was chairman of the subcommittee on standardization (Cabinet Committee on the Implementation of Urdu) in the Ministry of Information, Pakistan. He was also honorary chairman INKSOFT Inc., Islamabad, (Pakistan's first Software Localization Company) for the Localization for Urdu, Pakistani (Pashto, Punjabi, Sindhi), Persian, Dari and Arabic languages. His translation work goes for more than 50 thousand pages of Literary, Official, Technical, and Computer Localization. Translations include Hymns of Akhenaton, and The Book of Precious Stones by Al-Biruni into Urdu, published by National Book Foundation Islamabad. He has served as a professor of Pakistani languages, in Allama Iqbal Open University. He has also served as Director multimedia (Urdu Medium) e-course-ware (Urdu e-literacy), in Computer Science and Pakistani Languages Departments, Allama Iqbal Open University Islamabad. He has served as Project Director, Center of Excellence for Urdu Informatics, National Language Authority, Pakistan. He also worked in National Book Foundation as Asst. Editor monthly Kitab, and several other responsibilities. He was serving National Book Foundation as Advisor, Textbook Development since May 2014 for redesigning of textbooks for NBF establishing as Federal Textbook Board, Islamabad, as per style guides he already developed for Punjab Textbook Board, Lahore and federal Education. He was a member of the National Curriculum Council, Federal Ministry of Education Islamabad.

A thesis of M.Phil. level is written by Mussarat Khan Zahidi on the contributions of his works, in the Department of Urdu, University of Peshawar in 2007. Another Study of M.Phil. (Urdu) is conducted by Khalid Mehmood in the University of Sargodha on the linguistic contributions of his works in 2013. Two M.A. and B.A. honours level theses on his literary contributions are developed in the Education University, and FCC University, Lahore in 2012, and several others. The Impact of his Ghost Characters Theory created two doctoral theses: one in Pakistan in 2011 in CS Dept. International Islamic University, Islamabad by Dr. M. Imran Razzak on Online Urdu Character Recognition in Unconstrained Environment; and the second in India in 2013 in CS Dept. North Maharashtra University, Jalgaon by Dr. Imran Khan Pathan on Automatic Segmentation and Recognition of Offline Handwritten Urdu Text. He is also known as Localization Guru of Pakistan. This is also highlighted in the Weekly "Technology Times ", Islamabad.

He was the first in-charge of Microsoft Local Language Program for Urdu Language. He was also Head of Bureau of Translations, Dictionaries & Terminologies at the National Language Authority, Pakistan. His project of Urdu Informatics revealed an Institute for Urdu Informatics, related with Urdu language research and development for its use on computers.

== Awards and honours ==
The President of Pakistan granted him the National Civil Award Tamgha-i-Imtiaz on his contributions to the Urdu literature and Urdu Informatics, on 14 August 2010, that was given on 23 March 2011. He has been honoured with a higher civil award 'Sitara-i-Imtiaz' conferred by the President of Pakistan on 14 August 2015 and decorated on 23 March 2016. His books Iqbal ka Insiklopedia and Pakistani Urdu received appreciations from former presidents of Pakistan. He was deriving a hypothesis on Pakistani as a language on e-world, a theory against Hindustani. He was the flag-career activist linguist of Language Planning, Development, Promotion and Policy for Urdu and Pakistani languages.

He has been listed in international WHO'S WHO in Translation and Terminology (1995), published by Union Latine Infoterm International Where, How and Praetorius. He is also listed in the LINGUIST List. His credentials as an expert in multilingualism are mentioned in International Directory of Multilingualism, Union Latine, Paris (2007).

He has also been listed in the List of notable or famous alumni/graduates/students from University of the Punjab; prominent alums from this institution include celebrities, politicians and business people. His name is included in the top 1800 scholars/writers by a European researcher Paolo Nagrini of Munich, who impressed at least three other scholars among the thirty thousand on internet. He is the 1st theorist on Computer from Pakistan in the document of Ghost Characters Atomization-Combination Theory accepted and implemented by the UNICODE.

== See also ==
- Nastaʿlīq script
- Urdu
- Urdu Informatics
