= Anwaar Ahmad =

Pakistani writer

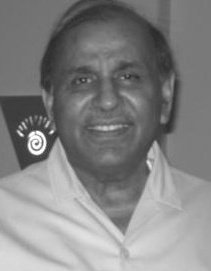
- Born: Anwaar Ahmad; 11 June 1947 (age 79); Multan, Punjab, Pakistan
- Education: Punjab University, Lahore (MA); Bahauddin Zakariya University (PhD)
- Occupation: Visiting Professor of Urdu Bahauddin Zakariya University
- Writing career
- Genres: Urdu short story, Criticism, Academician
- Notable works: Urdu Afsana: Aik Sadi ka Qisa; Yaadgar-e-Zamana Hain Jo Log; Akhri Khaat; Aik Hi Kahani
- Notable awards: Pakistan President's Pride of Performance, Saadi Literary Award, Higher Education Commission of PakistanBest Teacher Award

Anwaar Ahmad (Urdu: انوار احمد, born 11 June 1947, Multan) is an Urdu short story writer, scholar and academic from Pakistan. Presently, he is serving as the Director General at University of Gujrat's Sialkot campus. He has been associated with Bahauddin Zakariya University, Multan, and Government College University, Faisalabad as an academic, researcher, and departmental head (Urdu) for over 35 years. He has also served as a visiting professor at Ankara University in Ankara, Turkey and the Urdu department at Osaka University of Foreign Studies in Osaka, Japan.

He worked as the chairman of the National Language Authority from 17 June 2011 to 12 December 2012. He received the Best Teacher Award from the Higher Education Commission in 2000, and Presidential Pride of Performance in 2009, one of the highest literary awards from the Government of Pakistan.

He has authored and edited nineteen books. He has also published eight research papers in national and international journals of research. His book Urdu Afsana: Aik Sadi Ka Qissa has been acclaimed by Urdu scholars and researchers throughout Pakistan.

He is the 2010 recipient of the Saadi Literary Award.

== Education ==
Anwaar Ahmad obtained his early education from the Muslim Boys High School in Multan, Pakistan. He earned his Masters (Urdu) degree from Punjab University, Lahore, Pakistan in 1969. He then went on to obtain his PhD from Bahauddin Zakariya University in 1985. His dissertation was titled Urdu Short Story in its Socio-Political Perspective.

== Career ==
After obtaining his master's degree in Urdu, Anwaar Ahmad served the Education Department of the Government of Punjab and Government of Balochistan for six years. In 1975, he joined Bahauddin Zakariya University, Multan as a lecturer in the Department of Urdu. He served the same institution as chairman of the Department of Urdu, chairman of the Department of Seraiki and dean of the Faculty of Languages and Islamic Studies until his retirement in 2007.

He was sent as a delegate by the Government of Pakistan to Ankara University, Turkey for a period of four years (1995–1999). He was associated with the department of Urdu and Pakistan studies.

After his retirement in 2007, he was appointed the chairman of the department of Urdu and dean of the Faculty of Oriental Studies at Government College University, Faisalabad. In 2009, he proceeded to Osaka University in Osaka, Japan as a visiting associate professor.

On 17 June 2011, he was appointed as the chairman of the National Language Authority by the prime minister of Pakistan on the recommendation of the chairman search committee (Cabinet Division, Pakistan). He retired from the post on 12 December 2012.Has been writing Urdu columns titled 'Wada Khilafi' in the Urdu daily Dunya News. He also writes for the Pakistani socio-political website Top Story Online.

He served as the Director General at University of Gujrat's Sialkot sub-campus for a period of two years (2013–2015). Presently, he is associated with Bahauddin Zakariya University as a visiting professor at Department of Urdu.
