= Urdu alphabet =

Writing system used for Urdu

Urdu alphabet اُردُو حُرُوفِ تَہَجِّی‌ Urdū ḥurūf-i tahajjī
- The word Urdū written in the Urdu alphabet
- Script type: Abjad
- Official script: Pakistan (national); Some states in India
- Languages: Urdu

Related scripts
- Parent systems: Egyptian hieroglyphs: Proto-Sinaitic; Phoenician; Aramaic; Nabataean; Arabic; Perso-Arabic; Urdu alphabet
- Child systems: Balti; Bangladeshi Arabic alphabet; Brahui; Burushaski; Gawar-Bati; Khowar; Kohistani Shina; Palula; Rohingya Arabic; Shina; Torwali; Wakhi (in Pakistan)

Unicode
- Unicode range: U+0600 to U+06FF U+0750 to U+077F; U+FB50 to U+FDFF U+FE70 to U+FEFF

The Urdu alphabet (Urdu: اُردُو حُرُوفِ تَہَجِّی‌, romanized: urdū ḥurūf-i tahajjī) is the right-to-left alphabet used for writing Urdu. It is a modification of the Persian alphabet, which itself is derived from the Arabic script. It has official and national status in Pakistan, and is official in certain regions in India. The Urdu alphabet has up to 39 or 40 distinct letters with no distinct letter cases and is typically written in the calligraphic Nastaʿlīq script, whereas Arabic is more commonly written in the Naskh style.

Usually, transliterations of Urdu into the Latin alphabet (called Roman Urdu) have many phonemic elements or sounds that have no equivalent in English or other languages commonly written in the Latin script.

== History ==
The standard Urdu script is a modified version of the Perso-Arabic script and has its origins in 13th-century Iran. It is also related to Shahmukhi, used for the Punjabi language varieties in Punjab, Pakistan. It is closely related to the development of the Nastaʻliq style of Perso-Arabic script. During the Mughal era, Nasta'liq became the common script for writing the Hindustani language, especially Urdu.

Despite the invention of the Urdu typewriter in 1911, Urdu newspapers continued to publish prints of handwritten scripts by calligraphers known as katibs or khush-navees until the late 1980s. The Pakistani national newspaper Daily Jang was the first Urdu newspaper to use Nastaʿlīq computer-based composition. There are efforts underway to develop more sophisticated and user-friendly Urdu support on computers and the internet. Nowadays, nearly all Urdu newspapers, magazines, journals, and periodicals are composed on computers with Urdu software programs.

Other than the Indian subcontinent, the Urdu script is also used by Pakistan's large diaspora, including in the United Kingdom, the United Arab Emirates, the United States, Canada, Saudi Arabia and other places.

== Nastaliq ==
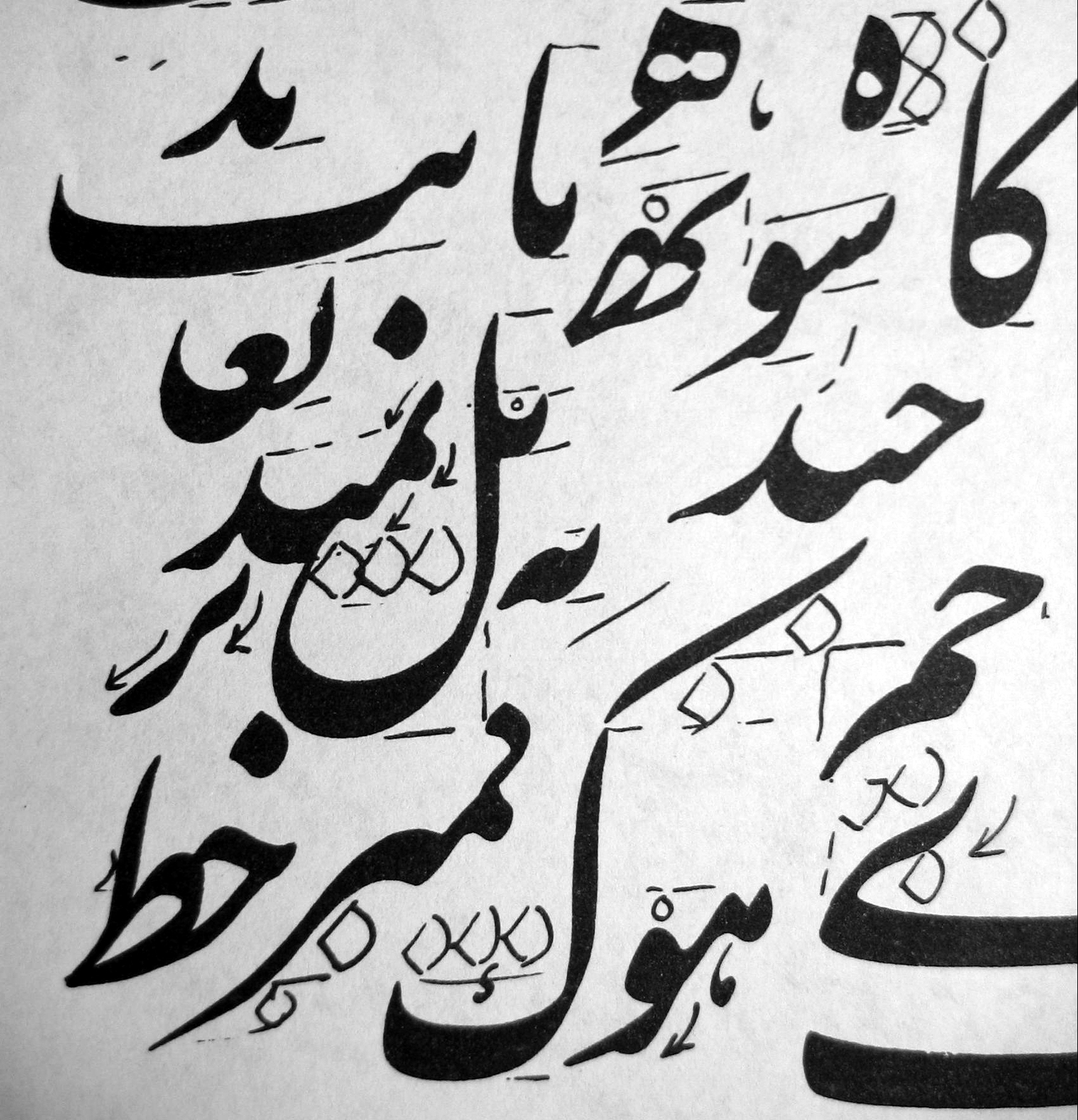
Example showing Nastaliq's (Persian) proportion rules.

Urdu is written in the Nastaliq style (Persian: نستعلیق Nastaʿlīq). The Nastaliq calligraphic writing style began as a Persian mixture of the Naskh and Ta'liq scripts. After the Muslim conquest of the Indian subcontinent, Nastaʻliq became the preferred writing style for Urdu. It is the dominant style in Pakistan, and many Urdu writers elsewhere in the world use it. Nastaʿlīq is more cursive and flowing than its Naskh counterpart.

In the Arabic alphabet, and many others derived from it, letters are regarded as having two or three general forms each, based on their position in the word (though Arabic calligraphy can add a great deal of complexity). But the Nastaliq style in which Urdu is written uses more than three general forms for many letters, even in simple non-decorative documents.

== Alphabet ==
The Urdu script is an Abjad script derived from the modern Persian script, which is itself a derivative of the Arabic script. As an Abjad, the Urdu script only shows consonants and long vowels; short vowels can only be inferred by the consonants' relation to each other. While this type of script is convenient in Semitic languages like Arabic and Hebrew, whose consonant roots are the key of the sentence, Urdu is an Indo-European language, which requires more precision towards vowel sound pronunciation, hence necessitating somewhat more memorization. The number of letters in the Urdu alphabet is somewhat ambiguous and debated.

=== Letter names and phonemes ===
Name	Forms				IPA	Romanization		Unicode	Order		
Urdu Roman Urdu	Isolated	Final	Medial	Initial	IPA	ALA-LC	Hunterian	Unicode	(Note: dictionary order)		
الف alif	ا	ـا			/ɑː/, /ʔ/, silent (Note: At the beginning of a word it can represent another vowel, holding a vowel diacritic that would normally be held by the consonant preceding the vowel, for example اُردو "Urdu". But the diacritic indicating which vowel is often omitted اردو like other short vowel diacritics.)	ā, –		U+0627	1		
بے bē	ب	ـب	ـبـ	بـ	/b/	b		U+0628	2		
پے pē	پ	ـپ	ـپـ	پـ	/p/	p		U+067E	3		
تے tē	ت	ـت	ـتـ	تـ	/t/	t		U+062A	4		
ٹے ṭē	ٹ	ـٹ	ـٹـ	ٹـ	/ʈ/	ṭ	t	U+0679	5		
ثے s̱ē	ث	ـث	ـثـ	ثـ	/s/	s̱	s	U+062B	6		
جيم jīm	ج	ـج	ـجـ	جـ	/d͡ʒ/	j		U+062C	7		
چے cē	چ	ـچ	ـچـ	چـ	/t͡ʃ/	c	ch	U+0686	8		
بڑی حے baṛī ḥē	ح	ـح	ـحـ	حـ	/ɦ/	ḥ	h	U+062D	9		
حائے حطی ḥā'e huttī	ح	ـح	ـحـ	حـ	/ɦ/	ḥ	h	U+062D	9		
حائے مہملہ ḥā'e muhmala	ح	ـح	ـحـ	حـ	/ɦ/	ḥ	h	U+062D	9		
حے ḥē	ح	ـح	ـحـ	حـ	/ɦ/	ḥ	h	U+062D	9		
خے k͟hē	خ	ـخ	ـخـ	خـ	/x/	k͟h	kh	U+062E	10		
دال dāl	د	ـد			/d/	d		U+062F	11		
ڈال ḍāl	ڈ	ـڈ			/ɖ/	ḍ	d	U+0688	12		
ذال ẕāl	ذ	ـذ			/z/	ẕ	z	U+0630	13		
رے rē	ر	ـر			/r/	r		U+0631	14		
ڑے ṛē	ڑ	ـڑ			/ɽ/ (Note: No Urdu word begins with ں, ھ, ڑ, or ے.)	ṛ	r	U+0691	15		
زے zē	ز	ـز			/z/	z		U+0632	16		
ژے zhē	ژ	ـژ			/ʒ/ (Note: Used mainly for Persian loanwords.)	zh		U+0698	17		
سین sīn	س		ـسـ	سـ	/s/	s		U+0633	18		
شین shīn	ش		ـشـ	شـ	/ʃ/	sh		U+0634	19		
صاد ṣwād	ص		ـصـ		/s/	ṣ	s	U+0635	20		
ضاد ẓwād	ض		ـضـ		/z/	ẓ	z	U+0636	21		
طوے t̤oʼē	ط		ـطـ		/t/	t̤	t	U+0637	22		
ظوے z̤oʼē	ظ		ـظـ		/z/	z̤	z	U+0638	23		
عین ʻain	ع	ـع	ـعـ	عـ	/ɑː/, /oː/, /eː/, /ʔ/, /ʕ/, silent	ʻ	ʻ	U+0639	24		
غین g͟hain	غ	ـغ	ـغـ	غـ	/ɣ/	g͟h	gh	U+063A	25		
فے fē	ف	ـف	ـفـ	فـ	/f/	f		U+0641	26		
قاف qāf	ق		ـقـ	قـ	/q/	q		U+0642	27		
کاف kāf	ک	ـک	ـکـ	کـ	/k/	k		U+06A9	28		
گاف gāf	گ	ـگ	ـگـ	گـ	/ɡ/	g		U+06AF	29		
لام lām	ل	ـل	ـلـ	لـ	/l/	l		U+0644	30		
میم mīm	م		ـمـ	مـ	/m/	m		U+0645	31		
نون nūn	ن	ـن	ـنـ	نـ	/n/, /ɲ/, /ɳ/, /ŋ/	n		U+0646	32		
نون غنّہ nūn g͟hunnā	ں ٘	ـں	ـںـ	ںـ	/ ◌̃ /	ṉ	n	U+06BA; U+0658 (Note: The version shown on the left is U+06BA, which is used only at the end of words. When it is used in the middle of a word it is a diacritic U+0658, which is usually omitted (see below for further information on diacritic omission in Urdu).)	(Note: Not present in dictionary order because it is not used at the beginning of words.)	32a	33
واؤ wāʼo	و				/ʋ /, /uː/, /ʊ /, /o ː /, /ɔː /	v, ū, u, o, au	w, ū, u, o, au	U+0648	33		34
ہے hē	ہ	ـہ	ـہـ	ہـ	/ɦ/, /ɑː/, /eː/	h, ā, e		U+06C1 (Note: Sometimes choṭī hē is used to refer to hey but choṭī hē can also refer to the Arabic / Persian variant, a stylistic variation representing an equivalent letter, but Persian and Arabic usually use U+0647 whereas Urdu uses U+06C1 for gōl hey. See also: Urdu in Unicode.)	34	34	35
چھوٹی ہے choṭī hē	ہ	ـہ	ـہـ	ہـ	/ɦ/, /ɑː/, /eː/	h, ā, e		U+06C1	34	34a	35
دو چشمی ہے do-cashmī hē	ھ		ـھـ		/ʰ/ or /ʱ/	h		U+06BE	35	34b	36
یے yē	ی	ـی	ـیـ	یـ	/j/, /iː/, /ɑː/	y, ī, á		U+06CC	36	35	38
بڑی یے baṛī yē	ے				/ɛː/, /eː/	ai, e		U+06D2	37	35b	39
ہمزہ hamzah	ئ	ـئ	ـئـ	ئـ	/ʔ/ or silent (Note: Hamzah: In Urdu, hamzah is silent in all its forms except for when it is used as hamzah-e-izafat. The main use of hamzah in Urdu is to indicate a vowel cluster.)	ʼ, –, yi		U+0626		35a	37
ہمزہ hamzah	ء				/ʔ/ or silent	ʼ, –, yi		U+0621		0	37

Footnotes:

=== Additional characters and variations ===
==== Arabic Tāʼ marbūṭah ====
Tāʼ marbūṭah is also sometimes considered the 40th letter of the Urdu alphabet, though it is rarely used except for in certain loan words from Arabic. Tāʼ marbūṭah is regarded as a form of tā, the Arabic version of Urdu tē, but it is not pronounced as such, and when replaced with an Urdu letter in naturalised loan words it is usually replaced with Gol hē.

==== Table ====
Table of additional characters and variations
Group	Letter (Note: Left: Urdu Nastaliq. Right: Arabic Naskh or modern style.)		Name (see: Glossary of key words)			Unicode
Group	Letter		Nastaliq (Note: The Nastaliq text will display in a different style if there is not an appropriate font installed on the machine.)	Naskh with diacritics	Roman Urdu or English	Unicode
Alif	آ	آ	الف مدہ	الِف مَدّه	alif maddah (Note: Most vowel diacritics are omitted in most Urdu writing, but Urdu writing usually does distinguish alif mad, and include hamza over bari ye, gol he, and wow. For example, alif mad and bare alif in آزادی - "āzādī", ɑ:zɑ:d̪i, freedom: are distinguished in most contexts.)	U+0622 alef with madda above
Hamza (Note: See: Hamzah in Nastaliq.)	ء	ء	ہمزہ	ہَمْزه	hamzah	U+0621 hamza
Hamza	ء	ء	___	___	hamza on the line	U+0621 hamza
Hamza	ٔ	ــٔـ	___	___	hamza diacritic (Note: See: Hamzah in Nastaliq.)	U+0654; Hamza Above
Hamza	ئ	ئ	ہمزہ	ہَمْزه	hamzah	U+0626 yeh with hamza above
Hamza	ئ	ئ	___	___	yē hamza / alif hamza	U+0626 yeh with hamza above
Hamza	ۓ	ۓ	___	___	baṛī yē hamza	U+06D3 yeh barree with hamza above
Hamza	ؤ	ؤ	واوِ مَہْمُوز	واوِ مَہْمُوز	vāv-e mahmūz	U+0624 waw with hamza above
Hamza	ۂ ‍ۂ	ۂ ـۂ	___	___		U+06C2 heh goal with hamza above or U+06C1 + U+0654
Arabic (Note: see: Arabic Tāʼ marbūṭah above.)	ۃ ‍ۃ	ۃ ـۃ	Arabic: تاء مربوطة	Arabic: تَاء مَرْبُوطَة	tāʼ marbūṭah "bound ta"	U+06C3 teh marbuta goal
Arabic	ۃ ‍ۃ	ة ـة	U+0629 teh marbuta			
ت	ت	Arabic: تاء مفتوحة	Arabic: تَاء مَفْتُوحَة	tāʼ maftūḥah "open ta"	U+062A; Teh	

Footnotes:

==== Hamza in Nastaliq ====
Hamza can be difficult to recognise in Urdu handwriting and fonts designed to replicate it, closely resembling two dots above as featured in ت Té and ق Qaf, whereas in Arabic and Geometric fonts it is more distinct and closely resembles the western form of the numeral 2 (two).

=== Digraphs ===
The digraphs of aspirated consonants are as follows.
Digraph	Transcription	IPA	Examples
بھ	bh	[bʱ]	بھاری
پھ	ph	[pʰ]	پھول
تھ	th	[t̪ʰ]	تھیلا
ٹھ	ṭh	[ʈʰ]	ٹھنڈا
جھ	jh	[d͡ʒʱ]	جھاڑی
چھ	chh	[t͡ʃʰ]	چھتری
دھ	dh	[d̪ʱ]	دھوبی
ڈھ	ḍh	[ɖʱ]	ڈھول
رھ	rh	[ɾʱ]	تیرھواں
ڑھ	ṛh	[ɽʱ]	اڑھائی
کھ	kh	[kʰ]	کھانسی
گھ	gh	[ɡʱ]	گھوڑا
لھ	lh	[lʱ]	دولھا (alternative of دُلہا)
مھ	mh	[mʱ]	تمھیں
نھ	nh	[nʱ]	ننھا

A separate do-chashmi-he letter, ھ, exists to denote a /ʰ/ or a /ʱ/. This letter is mainly used as part of the multitude of digraphs, detailed in above.

=== Differences from the Persian alphabet ===
Urdu has more letters added to the Perso-Arabic base to represent sounds not present in Persian, which already has additional letters added to the Arabic base itself to represent sounds not present in Arabic. The letters added are shown in the table below:

Letter	IPA
ٹ	/ʈ/
ڈ	/ɖ/
ڑ	/ɽ/
ں	/◌̃/
ے	/ɛ:/ or /e:/.

=== Retroflex letters ===

Old Hindustani used four dots ٿ ڐ ڙ over three Arabic letters ت د ر to represent retroflex consonants. In handwriting those dots were often written as a small vertical line attached to a small triangle. Subsequently, this shape became identical to a small letter ط t̤oʼē. It is commonly and erroneously assumed that ṭāʾ itself was used to indicate retroflex consonants because of it being an emphatic alveolar consonant that Arabic scribes thought approximated the Hindustani retroflexes. In modern Urdu, called to'e is always pronounced as a dental, not a retroflex.

== Vowels ==
The Urdu language has ten vowels and ten nasalized vowels. Each vowel has four forms depending on its position: initial, middle, final and isolated. Like in its parent Arabic alphabet, Urdu vowels are represented using a combination of digraphs and diacritics. Alif, Waw, Ye, He and their variants are used to represent vowels.

=== Vowel chart ===
Urdu does not have standalone vowel letters. Short vowels (a, i, u, o) are represented by optional diacritics (zabar, zer, pesh, ulta pesh) upon the preceding consonant or a placeholder consonant (alif, ain, or hamzah) if the syllable begins with the vowel, and long vowels by consonants alif, ain, ye, and wa'o as matres lectionis, with disambiguating diacritics, some of which are optional (zabar, zer, pesh, ulta pesh), whereas some are not (madd, hamzah). Urdu does not have short vowels at the end of words. This is a table of Urdu vowels:

Romanization	Pronunciation	Final	Middle	Initial
a	/ə/	N/A	ـَ	اَ
ā	/aː/	ـَا، ـَی، ـَہ	ـَا	آ
i	/ɪ/	N/A	ـِ	اِ
ī	/iː/	ـِى	ـِیـ	اِیـ
e	/eː/	ـے	ـیـ	ایـ
ai	/ɛː/	ـَے	ـَیـ	اَیـ
u	/ʊ/	N/A	ـُ	اُ
ū	/uː/	ـُو		اُو
o	/oː/	ـو		او
au	/ɔː/	ـَو		اَو

=== Alif ===
Alif is the first letter of the Urdu alphabet, and it is used exclusively as a vowel. At the beginning of a word, alif can be used to represent any of the short vowels: اب ab, اسم ism, اردو Urdū. For long ā at the beginning of words alif-mad is used: آپ āp, but a plain alif in the middle and at the end: بھاگنا bhāgnā.

=== Wāʾo ===
Wāʾo is used to render the vowels "ū", "o", "u" and "ō" ([uː], [oː], [ʊ] and [ɔː] respectively), and it is also used to render the labiodental approximant, [ʋ]. Only when preceded by the consonant k͟hē (خ), can wāʾo render the "u" ([ʊ]) sound (such as in خود, "k͟hud" - myself), or not pronounced at all (such as in خواب, "k͟haab" - dream). This is known as the silent wāʾo, and is only present in words loaned from Persian. When written with pesh (اُ / وُ), it is usually pronounced with "u" and "ū", for example "umeed" (اُمید) and "khushbū" (خوشبو). In the case of wāʾo being written with an ulta pesh (ـ ٗ / ـوٗ), it would be pronounced with an "o" and "ō", such as the likes of "mohtāj" (محتاج ٗ) and "jāgō" (جاگـوٗ)

=== Ye ===
Ye is divided into two variants: choṭī ye ("little ye") and baṛī ye ("big ye").

Choṭī ye (ی) is written in all forms exactly as in Persian. It is used for the long vowel "ī" and the consonant "y".

Baṛī ye (ے) is used to render the vowels "e" and "ai" (/eː/ and /ɛː/ respectively). Baṛī ye is distinguishable in writing from choṭī ye only when it comes at the end of a word/ligature. Additionally, Baṛī ye is never used to begin a word/ligature, unlike choṭī ye.

Letter's name	Final Form	Middle Form	Initial Form	Isolated Form
چھوٹی يے; Choṭī ye	ـی	ـیـ	یـ	ی
بڑی يے; Baṛī ye	ـے	ـیـ	یـ	ے

=== The 2 hes ===
He is divided into two variants: gol he ("round he") and do-cašmi he ("two-eyed he").

Gol he (ہ) is written round and zigzagged, and can impart the "h" (/ɦ/) sound anywhere in a word. Additionally, at the end of a word, it can be used to render the long "a" or the "e" vowels (/ɑː/ or /eː/), which also alters its form slightly (on modern digital writing systems, this final form is achieved by writing two he's consecutively).

Do-cašmi he (ھ) is written as in Arabic Naskh style script (as a loop), in order to create the aspirate consonants and write Arabic words.

Letter's name	Final Form	Middle Form	Initial Form	Isolated Form
گول ہے; Gol he	ـہ	ـہـ	ہـ	ہ
دو چشمی ہے; Do-cašmi he	ـھ	ـھـ		ھ

=== Ayn ===
Ayn in its initial and final position is silent in pronunciation and is replaced by the sound of its preceding or succeeding vowel.

=== Nun Ghunnah ===
Vowel nasalization is represented by nun ghunna written after their non-nasalized versions, for example: ہَے when nasalized would become ہَیں. In middle form nun ghunna is written just like nun and is differentiated by a diacritic called maghnoona or ulta jazm which is a superscript V symbol above the ن٘.

Examples:

Form	Urdu	Transcription
Orthography	ں	ṉ
End form	میں	maiṉ
Middle form	کن٘ول	kaṉwal

== Diacritics ==
Urdu uses the same subset of diacritics used in Arabic based on Persian conventions. Urdu also uses Persian names of the diacritics instead of Arabic names. Commonly used diacritics are zabar (Arabic fatḥah ــَ ), zer (Arabic kasrah ـِـ ), pesh (Arabic dammah ـُـ ) and ulta pesh which are used to clarify the pronunciation of vowels, as shown above. Jazam (ـْـ, Arabic sukun) is used to indicate a consonant cluster and tashdid (ـّـ, Arabic shaddah ـّـ ) is used to indicate a gemination, although it is never used for verbs, which require double consonants to be spelled out separately. Other diacritics include khari zabar (Arabic dagger alif ـٰـ ), do zabar (Arabic fathatan ـًـ ) which are found in some common Arabic loan words. Other Arabic diacritics are also sometimes used though very rarely in loan words from Arabic. Zer-e-izafat and hamzah-e-izafat are described in the next section.

Other than common diacritics, Urdu also has special diacritics, which are often found only in dictionaries for the clarification of irregular pronunciation. These diacritics include kasrah-e-majhool, fathah-e-majhool, dammah-e-majhool, maghnoona, ulta jazam, alif-e-wavi and some other very rare diacritics. Among these, only maghnoona is used commonly in dictionaries and has a Unicode representation at U+0658. Other diacritics are only rarely written in printed form, mainly in some advanced dictionaries.

== Iẓāfat ==
Iẓāfat is a syntactical construction of two nouns, where the first component is a determined noun, and the second is a determiner. This construction was borrowed from Persian. A short vowel "i" is used to connect these two words, and when pronouncing the newly formed word the short vowel is connected to the first word. If the first word ends in a consonant or an ʿain (ع), it may be written as zer ( ِ ) at the end of the first word, but usually is not written at all. If the first word ends in choṭī he (ہ) or ye (ی or ے) then hamzā (ء) is used above the last letter (ۂ or ئ or ۓ). If the first word ends in a long vowel (ا or و), then a different variation of baṛī ye (ے) with hamzā on top (ئے, obtained by adding ے to ئ) is added at the end of the first word.

Forms	Example	Transliteration	Meaning
ـ◌ِ	شیرِ پنجاب	sher-e-Panjāb	the lion of Punjab
ۂ	ملکۂ دنیا	malikā-e-dunyā	the queen of the world
ئ	ولئ کامل	walī-e-kāmil	perfect saint
ـئے	مئے عشق	mai-e-ishq	the wine of love
ئے	روئے زمین	rū-'e-zamīn	the surface of the Earth
ئے	صدائے بلند	sadā-'e-buland	a high voice

== Computers and the Urdu alphabet ==
In the early days of computers, Urdu was not properly represented on any code page. One of the earliest code pages to represent Urdu was IBM Code Page 868 which dates back to 1990. Other early code pages which represented Urdu alphabets were Windows-1256 and MacArabic encoding both of which date back to the mid-1990s. In Unicode, Urdu is represented inside the Arabic block. Another code page for Urdu, which is used in India, is Perso-Arabic Script Code for Information Interchange. In Pakistan, the 8-bit code page which is developed by National Language Authority is called Urdu Zabta Takhti (اردو ضابطہ تختی) (UZT) which represents Urdu in its most complete form including some of its specialized diacritics, though UZT is not designed to coexist with the Latin alphabet.

=== Encoding Urdu in Unicode ===
Confusable glyphs in Urdu and Arabic script
Characters in Urdu	Characters in Arabic
ہ (U+06C1) ھ (U+06BE)	ه (U+0647)
ی (U+06CC)	ى (U+0649) ي (U+064A)
ک (U+06A9)	ك (U+0643)

Like other writing systems derived from the Arabic script, Urdu uses the 0600–06FF Unicode range. Certain glyphs in this range appear visually similar (or identical when presented using particular fonts) even though the underlying encoding is different. This presents problems for information storage and retrieval. For example, the University of Chicago's electronic copy of John Shakespear's "A Dictionary, Hindustani, and English" includes the word 'بهارت' (bhārat "India"). Searching for the string "بھارت" (with ھ) returns no results, whereas querying with the (identical-looking in many fonts) string "بهارت" (with ه) returns the correct entry. This is because the medial form of the Urdu letter do chashmi he (U+06BE)—used to form aspirate digraphs in Urdu—is visually identical in its medial form to the Arabic letter hāʾ (U+0647; phonetic value /h/). In Urdu, the /h/ phoneme is represented by the character U+06C1, called gol he (round he), or chhoti he (small he).

In 2003, the Center for Research in Urdu Language Processing (CRULP)—a research organisation affiliated with Pakistan's National University of Computer and Emerging Sciences—produced a proposal for mapping from the 1-byte UZT encoding of Urdu characters to the Unicode standard. This proposal suggests a preferred Unicode glyph for each character in the Urdu alphabet.

=== Software ===
The Daily Jang was the first Urdu newspaper to be typeset digitally in Nastaʻliq by computer. There are efforts underway to develop more sophisticated and user-friendly Urdu support on computers and on the Internet. Nowadays, nearly all Urdu newspapers, magazines, journals and periodicals are composed on computers via various Urdu software programmes, the most widespread of which is InPage Desktop Publishing package. Microsoft has included Urdu language support in all new versions of Windows and both Windows Vista and Microsoft Office 2007 are available in Urdu through Language Interface Pack support. Most Linux Desktop distributions allow the easy installation of Urdu support and translations as well. Apple implemented the Urdu language keyboard across Mobile devices in its iOS 8 update in September 2014.

== Romanization standards and systems ==
There are several romanization standards for writing Urdu with the Latin alphabet, though they are not very popular because most fall short of representing the Urdu language properly. Instead of standard romanization schemes, people on Internet, mobile phones and media often use a non-standard form of romanization which tries to mimic English orthography. The problem with this kind of romanization is that it can only be read by native speakers, and even for them with great difficulty. Among standardized romanization schemes, the most accurate is ALA-LC romanization, which is also supported by National Language Authority. Other romanization schemes are often rejected because either they are unable to represent sounds in Urdu properly, or they often do not take regard of Urdu orthography, and favor pronunciation over orthography.

The National Language Authority of Pakistan has developed a number of systems with specific notations to signify non-English sounds, but these can only be properly read by someone already familiar with the loan letters.

Roman Urdu also holds significance among the Christians of Pakistan and North India. Urdu was the dominant native language among Christians of Karachi and Lahore in present-day Pakistan and Madhya Pradesh, Uttar Pradesh Rajasthan in India, during the early part of the 19th and 20th century, and is still used by Christians in these places. Pakistani and Indian Christians often used the Roman script for writing Urdu. Thus Roman Urdu was a common way of writing among Pakistani and Indian Christians in these areas up to the 1960s. The Bible Society of India publishes Roman Urdū Bibles that enjoyed sale late into the 1960s (though they are still published today). Church songbooks are also common in Roman Urdu. However, the usage of Roman Urdu is declining with the wider use of Hindi and English in these states.

== Glossary of key words from letter names ==
Translations and other uses of key words from Urdu letter names
Letter name(s)			Urdu word				Examples of other uses		
Isolated form	Urdu name	Roman Urdu	Urdu	IPA	Roman Urdu name	English Translation	Urdu	Roman Urdu or IPA	Translation
ح	بَڑی حے	baṛī ħē	بَڑی	bəɽi	baṛī / bari	big / elder	بڑی آنت	Baṛi ant	large intestine
ے	بَڑی يـے	baṛī yē	بَڑی	bəɽi	baṛī / bari	big / elder	آنت	Ant	intestine
ی	چھوٹی یے	čhōṭī yē	چھوٹی	tʃʰoːʈi	choti	small / minor / junior	آنت	Ant	intestine
ہ	چھوٹی ہے	čhōṭī hē	چھوٹی	tʃʰoːʈi	choti	small / minor / junior	چھوٹی آنت		small intestine
ہ	گول ہـے	gōl hē	گول	goːl	gōl	round / spherical / vague / silly / obese	گول گپے	gol gappay	panipuri
ھ	دوچَشْمی ہے	dō-čašmī hē	دوچَشْمی		do-cashmī	two-eyed	دو چشمی دوربین	do-cashmi dorabīn	binoculars
ھ	دوچَشْمی ہے	dō-čašmī hē	دوچَشْمی		do-cashmī	two-eyed	دوربین	dorabīn	telescope
ھ	دوچَشْمی ہے	dō-čašmī hē	دو		do	2 / two	دو ایوانیت	do ayvanīt	bicameralism
ھ	دوچَشْمی ہے	dō-čašmī hē	چشم	/tʃəʃm/	chashm	the eye / hope / expectation	چشم	cashm	eye
ں	نُونِ غُنّہ	nūn ğunnah	غُنّہ	ɣʊnnɑ	ğunnah / g͟hunnah	nasal sound or twang			
آ	الِف مَدّه	alif maddah	مَدّه		maddah	Arabic:			
ؤ	واوِ مَہْمُوز	vāv-e mahmūz	مَہْمُوز	mæhmuːz	mahmūz	defective / improper			
ء ا آ ب پ ت ٹ ث ب ج چ خ ح د ڈ ذ ر ڑ ز ژ س ش ص ض ط ظ ع غ ف ق ک گ ل م ن ں و ہ ھ ی ے	حروف تہجی	harūf tahajī (alphabet)	تہجی		tahajī	sequence			
ء ا آ ب پ ت ٹ ث ب ج چ خ ح د ڈ ذ ر ڑ ز ژ س ش ص ض ط ظ ع غ ف ق ک گ ل م ن ں و ہ ھ ی ے	حروف تہجی	harūf tahajī (alphabet)	حُرُوف	/hʊruːf/	harūf	letters (plural) (often referred to as "alphabets" in informal Pakistani English)			
ء ا آ ب پ ت ٹ ث ب ج چ خ ح د ڈ ذ ر ڑ ز ژ س ش ص ض ط ظ ع غ ف ق ک گ ل م ن ں و ہ ھ ی ے	حروف تہجی	harūf tahajī (alphabet)	حَرْف	/hərf/	harf	"letter of the alphabet" / handwriting / statement / blame / stigma			

== See also ==
- Nastaʻliq script
- Romanization of Urdu
- Urdu Braille
- Urdu Informatics
- Urdu keyboard
- Urdu Wikipedia

== Sources ==
- Delacy, Richard (2003). Beginner's Urdu Script. McGraw-Hill.
- Delacy, Richard (2010). Read and write Urdu script. McGraw-Hill. ISBN 978-0-07-174746-2.
- "Urdu romanization" (PDF). The Library of Congress.
- Ishida, Richard. "Urdu script notes".
