= Urdu Informatics =

Urdu Informatics (Urdu: اردو اطلاعیات) relates to the research and contributions in bringing the utilities and usage of Urdu to the modern information and communication technologies in education and business. National Language Authority in Pakistan has been at the forefront in introducing Urdu Informatics as a tool for the standardisation of Urdu language. Major steps in this respect include the development of Urdu keyboard and launching of software to automate translations between Urdu and English languages.

== Institutional support ==
There is a dedicated national Centre of Excellence for Urdu Informatics that operates under the auspices of National Language Authority that has been carrying out research on the standardisation of Urdu alphabets for electronic media.

Other institutional contributions also relate to the use of Urdu for internet applications, input controls, dynamic association of keyboard buttons to Urdu alphabets and use of proper character coding schemes.

== See also ==
- Urdu literature
- Urdu keyboard
- Nasta'liq script
- Perso-Arabic script
- Urdu Wikipedia
