= National Language Promotion Department =

Autonomous regulatory institution of Pakistan

National Language Authority
- Type: Attached Department
- Founded: 1979; 47 years ago
- Headquarters: Islamabad, Pakistan
- Area served: Standardisation and promotion of Urdu
- Divisions: 6
- Website: http://www.nlpd.gov.pk

The National Language Promotion Department (Urdu: اِدارۂ فروغِ قومی زُبان Idāra-ē Farōġ-ē Qaumī Zabān [ɪ.ˈd̪aː.rə.eː fə.ˈroːɣ.eː ˈqɔː.mi zə.ˈbaːn]), formerly known as the National Language Authority (or Urdu Language Authority), is an autonomous regulatory institution established in 1979 to support the advancement and promotion of Urdu, which is the national language of Pakistan. Its status has since been changed to attached department. Initially, it was aimed at creating synergy between national and provincial governments and institutions for using Urdu. However, with time, it expanded its horizons to include standardisation and linguistic aspects such as orthography and lexicography. It also provides recommendations for maximizing use of the Urdu language in all walks of life. In this respect, large amounts of legal and scientific documents are translated from English and other languages for publication into Urdu. These efforts have resulted in greater awareness of the language's potential as well as its localisation. Recently, the status and name of organization has been changed from National Language Authority to National Language Promotion Department. The National Language Promotion Department is now an attached department of Ministry of National Heritage & Integration. Renowned short-story writer and educationist Dr. Anwaar Ahmad was the last Chairman of the NLA, as the post has been converted to Director General (D.G.).

== Objectives ==
The institution aims to facilitate the use and adoption of Urdu language through publications and other reading materials for individuals and organisations. It also provides linkages for cooperation and collaboration among various academic, research and educational institutions for use of Urdu language and native languages of the country. Over the years efforts have also been made to promote and facilitate Urdu as an official and business language, as a medium of instruction, and as a medium of expression in the country.

== Organisation ==
The organisational structure consists of six divisions that include: Dictionary section (Darul Lughaat), Translations section (Darul Tarjuma), Literature section (Darul Tasneef), and Publications section (Darul Isha’at) respectively. There is also a department of Urdu Informatics (اردو اطلاعیات) to carry out research in developing the suitable hardware and software for the use of language in electronic media. A dedicated library contains extensive resources on Urdu, and issues regular Urdu Bulletins.

== Key activities ==
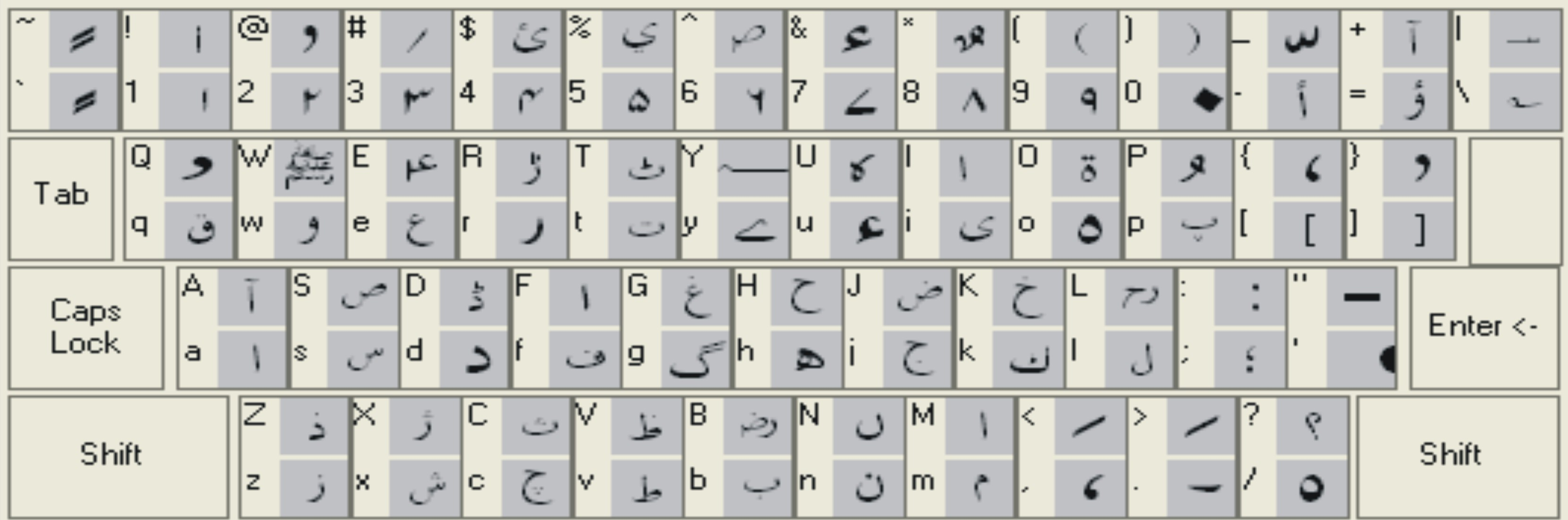
Urdu keyboard layout

The institution has published a wide range of general, scientific and technical dictionaries and an Urdu Thesaurus. Especially, the Qaumi English-Urdu Dictionary has been based on Webster's Dictionary. A vast amount of literature has also been produced to encourage reading habits among children.

In 1980, the Authority standardised the Urdu keyboard layout for typewriters based on Naskh script. Later on, with the arrival of the digital age, the layout was improved for teleprinters and Information processing. Subsequently, in 1998 efforts were initiated to standardize Urdu encoding, which resulted in the formation of Urdu Zabta Takhti (اردو ضابطہ تختی) (UZT). This development was inline with the efforts to cope with the emerging demands of Urdu applications from word processing to mega-scale projects such as Computerised National Identity Cards by NADRA and a number of E-Governance initiatives by the national government. In July 2000, UZT 1.01 was standardised for all kinds of electronic computing, communications, and storage. Based on this version, Urdu language support was incorporated into the Versions 3.1 and 4.0 of Unicode. Localization of Microsoft applications like Windows and Office in Urdu is also done by then NLA, now NLPD.

As of 2026 it had published 800 books as well about 125 bibliographies and booklets for reference purposes.

== See also ==
- National Council for Promotion of Urdu Language
- Urdu literature
- Urdu keyboard
- Urdu Informatics
- Urdu alphabet
