= Urdu =

Indo-Aryan language

- اُردُو (Urdū)
- Urdu written in the Nastaliq calligraphic hand
- Pronunciation: [ˈʊɾd̪uː]
- Native to: South Asia
- Region: Pakistan (lingua franca); Hindi–Urdu Belt and Deccan (India); Terai (Nepal); Old Dhaka (Bangladesh); See geographical distribution of Urdu speakers for more
- Speakers: L1: 78 million (2011–2023); L2: 168 million (2011–2020); Total: 246 million (2011–2023)
- Language family: Indo-European: Indo-Iranian; Indo-Aryan; Central Zone; Western Hindi; Hindustani; Urdu
- Early forms: Shauraseni Prakrit: Apabhraṃśa; Old Hindi; Hindustani; Rekhta
- Dialects: Begamati †; Deccani; Dhakaiya; Judeo-Urdu †; Kalkatiya; Karkhandari
- Writing system: Perso-Arabic script (Urdu alphabet); Urdu Braille

Official status
- Official language in: Pakistan (national); India (scheduled); Jammu and Kashmir; Ladakh; Delhi (additional); Bihar (additional); Uttar Pradesh (additional); Jharkhand (additional); Andhra Pradesh (additional); Telangana (additional); West Bengal (additional)
- Recognised minority language in: South Africa (protected language)
- Regulated by: National Language Promotion Department (Pakistan); National Council for Promotion of Urdu Language (India)

Language codes
- ISO 639-1: ur
- ISO 639-2: urd
- ISO 639-3: urd
- Glottolog: urdu1245
- Linguasphere: 59-AAF-q
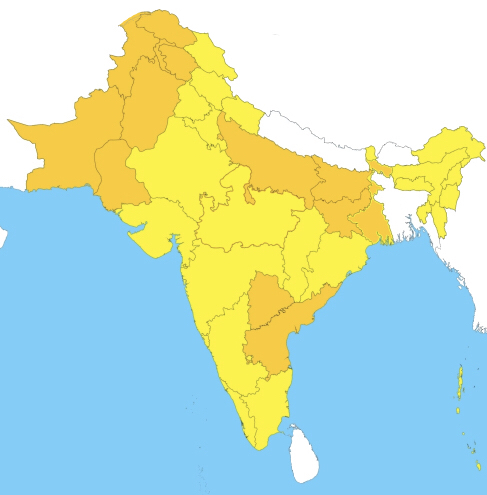
- Map of the regions of India and Pakistan showing: Areas where Urdu is either official or co-official Areas where Urdu is neither official nor co-official

Urdu (Note: English: /ˈʊərduː/ OOR-doo) (اُرْدُو, urdū, [ˈʊɾduː]) is an Indo-Aryan language, spoken primarily in South Asia. It is the national language and lingua franca of Pakistan. In India, it is an Eighth Schedule language whose status and function are recognised by the Constitution of India — alongside having official status in several Indian states and territories. (Note: Urdu has some form of official status in the Indian states of Andhra Pradesh, Bihar, Jharkhand, Telangana, Uttar Pradesh and West Bengal, as well as the national capital territory of Delhi and the union territories of Jammu and Kashmir, and Ladakh.)

Urdu and Hindi are closely related. They share a common, predominantly Sanskrit- and Prakrit-derived, vocabulary base, phonology, syntax, and grammar, making them mutually intelligible during colloquial communication. The common base of the two languages is sometimes referred to as the Hindi–Urdu or Hindustani language, and Urdu has been described as a Persianised standard register of the Hindustani language. While formal Urdu draws literary, political, and technical vocabulary from Persian and Arabic, formal Hindi draws these aspects from Sanskrit; consequently, the two languages' mutual intelligibility effectively decreases as the level of formality increases.

Urdu originated geographically in the upper Ganga-Yamuna doab, in and around the Delhi region, where Khari Boli was spoken. Urdu shared a grammatical foundation with Khari Boli, but was written in a revised Perso-Arabic script and included vocabulary borrowed from Persian and Arabic, which retained its original grammatical structure in those languages. In 1837, Urdu became an official language of the British East India Company, replacing Persian across northern India during Company rule; Persian had until this point served as the court language of various Indo-Islamic empires.

According to 2026 estimates by Ethnologue, Urdu is the 10th-most widely spoken language in the world, with 246 million total speakers, including those who speak it as a second language.

== Etymology ==
The name Urdu was first used by the Indian poet Ghulam Hamadani Mushafi around 1780 for the language, even though he himself also used Hindavi term in his poetry to define the language. Ordu means army in the Turkic languages. In late 18th century, it was known as Zaban-e-Urdu-e-Mualla زبانِ اُرْدُوئے مُعَلّٰی means language of the exalted camp. It was previously known by several terms such as Hindvi, Hindi, Hindustani and Rekhta.

== History ==
=== Origins ===
Urdu is a part of the Hindi–Urdu linguistic continuum, which is commonly referred to as Hindustani in contemporary usage. Some linguists have suggested that the earliest forms of Urdu evolved from the medieval (6th to 13th century) Apabhraṃśa register of the preceding Shauraseni language, a Middle Indo-Aryan language that is also the ancestor of other modern Indo-Aryan languages. In the Delhi region of India, the native language was Khariboli, whose earliest form is known as Old Hindi (or Hindavi). It belongs to the Western Hindi group of the Central Indo-Aryan languages. The contact of Hindu and Muslim cultures during the period of Muslim conquests in the Indian subcontinent (12th to 16th centuries) led to the development of Hindustani as a product of a composite Ganga-Jamuni tehzeeb.

In cities such as Delhi, the ancient language Old Hindi began to acquire many Persian loanwords and continued to be called "Hindi" and later, also "Hindustani". An early literary tradition of Hindavi was founded by Amir Khusrau in the late 13th century, who has been called "the father of Urdu literature". After the conquest of the Deccan, and a subsequent immigration of noble Muslim families into the south, a form of the language flourished in medieval India as a vehicle of poetry, (especially under the Bahmanids), and is known as Dakhini, which contains loanwords from Telugu and Marathi.

From the 13th century until the end of the 18th century, the language now known as Urdu was called Hindi, Hindavi, Hindustani, Dehlavi, Dihlawi, Lahori, and Lashkari. The Delhi Sultanate established Persian as its official language in India, a policy continued by the Mughal Empire, which extended over most of northern South Asia from the 16th century to the 18th, and cemented Persian influence on Hindustani.

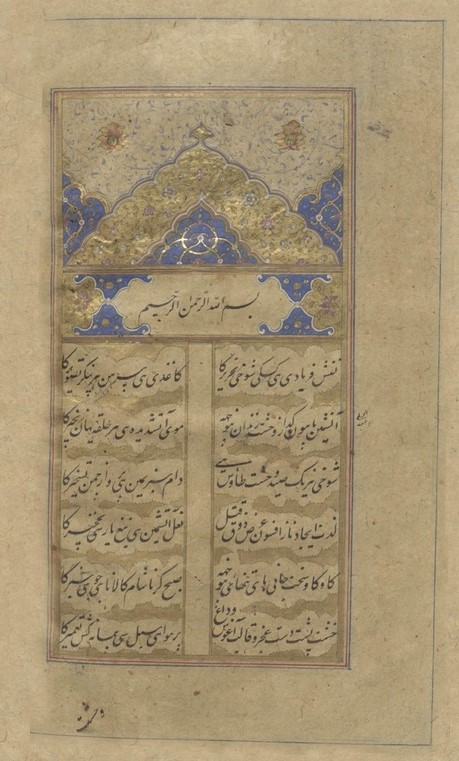
Opening pages of the Urdu divan of Ghalib, 1821

According to the Navadirul Alfaz by Khan-i Arzu, the "Zaban-e Urdu-e Shahi" [language of the Imperial Camp] had attained special importance in the time of Alamgir". By the end of the reign of Aurangzeb in the early 1700s, the common language around Delhi began to be referred to as Zaban-e-Urdu, a name derived from the Turkic word ordu (army) or orda and is said to have arisen as the "language of the camp", or "Zaban-i-Ordu" means "Language of High camps" or natively "Lashkari Zaban" means "Language of Army" even though the term Urdu held different meanings at that time. It is recorded that Aurangzeb spoke in Hindvi, which was most likely Persianised, as there are substantial evidence that Hindvi was written in the Persian script in this period.

During this time period, Urdu was referred to as "Moors", which simply meant Muslim, by European writers. John Ovington wrote in 1689:

The language of the Moors is different from that of the ancient original inhabitants of India but is obliged to these Gentiles for its characters. For though the Moors dialect is peculiar to themselves, yet it is destitute of Letters to express it; and therefore, in all their Writings in their Mother Tongue, they borrow their letters from the Heathens, or from the Persians, or other Nations.

In 1715, a complete literary Diwan in Rekhta was written by Nawab Sadruddin Khan. An Urdu-Persian dictionary was written by Khan-i Arzu in 1751 in the reign of Ahmad Shah Bahadur. The name Urdu was first introduced by the poet Ghulam Hamadani Mushafi around 1780. As a literary language, Urdu took shape in courtly, elite settings. While Urdu retained the grammar and core Indo-Aryan vocabulary of the local Indian dialect Khariboli, it adopted the Perso-Arab writing system, written in the Nastaleeq style. – which was developed as a style of Persian calligraphy.

Urdu was patronised by the Nawab of Awadh and in Lucknow, the language was refined, being not only spoken in the court, but by the common people in the city—both Hindus and Muslims; the city of Lucknow gave birth to Urdu prose literature, with a notable novel being Umrao Jaan Ada.

=== Other historical names ===
Throughout the history of the language, Urdu has been referred to by several other names: Hindi, Hindavi, Rekhta, Urdu-e-Muallah, Dakhini, Moors and Dehlavi.

In 1773, the Swiss French soldier Antoine Polier notes that the English liked to use the name "Moors" for Urdu:

I have a deep knowledge [je possède à fond] of the common tongue of India, called Moors by the English, and Ourdouzebain by the natives of the land.

Several works of Sufi writers like Ashraf Jahangir Semnani used similar names for the Urdu language. Shah Abdul Qadir Raipuri was the first person who translated The Quran into Urdu.

During Shahjahan's time, the Capital was relocated to Delhi and named Shahjahanabad and the Bazar of the town was named Urdu e Muallah.

In the Akbar era, the word Rekhta was used to describe Urdu for the first time. It was originally a Persian word that meant "to create a mixture". Amir Khusrau was the first person to use the same word for Poetry.

=== Colonial period ===
Before the standardisation of Urdu into colonial administration, British officers often referred to the language as "Moors" or "Moorish jargon". John Gilchrist was the first in British India to begin a systematic study on Urdu and began to use the term "Hindustani" what the majority of Europeans called "Moors", authoring the book The Strangers's East Indian Guide to the Hindoostanee or Grand Popular Language of India (improperly Called Moors).

Urdu was promoted in colonial India by British policies to counter the previous emphasis on Persian, and the language also gained official status in colonial India because it was the language of the Muslim elite (such as Nawabs and Zamindars). Religious, social, and political factors arose during the European colonial period in India that advocated a distinction between Urdu and Hindi, leading to the Hindi–Urdu controversy. In colonial India, ordinary Muslims and Hindus alike spoke the same language in the United Provinces in the nineteenth century, namely Hindustani, whether called by that name or whether called Hindi, Urdu, or one of the regional dialects such as Braj or Awadhi. Elites from Muslim communities, as well as a minority of Hindu elites, such as Munshis of Hindu origin, wrote the language in the Perso-Arabic script in courts and government offices, though Hindus continued to employ the Devanagari script in certain literary and religious contexts. Through the late 19th century, people did not view Urdu and Hindi as being two distinct languages, though in urban areas, the standardised Hindustani language was increasingly being referred to as Urdu and written in the Perso-Arabic script. Urdu and English replaced Persian as the official languages in northern parts of India in 1837. Hindus in northwestern India, under the Arya Samaj agitated against the sole use of the Perso-Arabic script and argued that the language should be written in the native Devanagari script, which triggered a backlash against the use of Hindi written in Devanagari by the Anjuman-e-Islamia of Lahore.

Advocacy for a standardised Hindi, based on Khari Boli, which would have equal official recognition did not begin until the 1860s. Proponents of Hindi over Urdu as an authorised language also had to take into account the existence of numerous provincial languages such as Awadhi, Braj Bhasha, Bhojpuri, Bundeli, and Maithili, which were considered a part of older Hindi, but which would problematise dialogues for an official, modern standard Hindi. Modern Standard Hindi did not emerge before the 20th century. The recognition of the Hindi script as an official script of courts in North India in 1900 was a key juncture in the evolution of Hindi-based language nationalism. Hindi, which was still not altogether standardised by the 1910s, and which had hitherto been considered an unrefined language was strictly patrolled to deliver a Sanskritic lexicon that did not permit influence of Urdu to be evident, Mahavir Prasad Dwivedi notably preparing the spelling, punctuation, and vocabulary of Modern Standard Hindi.

The Hindi–Urdu controversy in 1867, highlighted the linguistic and cultural divide between Hindus and Muslims in British India, with Urdu emerging as a symbol of the linguistic pride of Indian Muslims. This division played an important role in the political movement of Muslims, eventually leading to the formation of the All-India Muslim League in 1906, whose formation eventually resulted in the creation of Pakistan, as a separate Muslim state in the Indian subcontinent. The controversy began to emerge when certain Hindu leaders and organisations, including the Banaras Institute and the Allahabad Institute, advocated for replacing Urdu with Hindi as the official language. This firm stance contributed to prompting Sir Syed Ahmed Khan—who was an advocate of the Hindu-Muslim unity, but later known as the 'Father of Two-nation theory'—to advocate for the use of Urdu. He regarded Urdu as a symbol of Muslim heritage in the Indian subcontinent. Sir Syed also considered Urdu "a common legacy of Hindus and Muslims", and supported the use of Urdu through his writings. Under Sir Syed, the Scientific Society of Aligarh translated Western works only into Urdu. The Urdu movement, which was a sociopolitical movement aimed at making Urdu as the universal lingua-franca of the Muslims of the subcontinent was fuelled by Aligarh movement of Sir Syed Ahmed Khan. This movement strongly influenced the Muslim League and the Pakistan Movement.

During the 1937 Lucknow session of the All-India Muslim League, the Raja of Mahmudabad, Mohammad Amir Ahmed Khan encouraged Urdu-speaking communities in British India to actively support and safeguard the Urdu language using all possible means.

Liaquat Ali Khan, who was later the first prime minister of Pakistan, stated in 1939: 'We left Arabic language for this India and for the Hindus, we left Turkish language and adopted a language which came into existence and made progress in this country – a language which is not spoken anywhere else. Now, it is demanded of us that we should speak the language of Balmeek. We have taken many steps forward for the sake of Hindu-Muslim unity. We shall not now take another step forward. We are standing at the edge of our limit. Anyone who wishes to meet us should come here'. On 31 December 1939, Sayyid Sulaiman Nadvi, while delivering his presidential address at the Urdu Muslim Conference in Calcutta, said, "In the brightness of the modern-daylight, something darkly unfair is being done and which is that every government official from top to bottom is engaged in doing his utmost in promoting the cause of Hindi. In my opinion, it is a disfavour to the Congress rather than a favour; it is reinforcing the misconception in the minds of the Muslims that it is what we can do with half the powers, what else we will do with full powers; as a result of which the country will be divided into two parts." A renowned Congressite, Tufail Ahmad Manglori, once acknowledged that the passage of a resolution against Urdu in the United Provinces caused deep distress among Muslims. He noted that the Hindi–Urdu controversy contributed to increasing divisions between the two communities, which continued to widen over time. Before the establishment of Pakistan, many Muslims of colonial India actively supported Urdu as their national language, and the language emerged as a symbol of unity during the Pakistan Movement by demonstrating that it possessed all the essential traits to affirm the need for a separate state for the Muslims of colonial India.

British language policy played a role in shaping political developments that eventually led to the partition of colonial India into India and Pakistan. This outcome was paralleled by the linguistic divide of the Hindi–Urdu continuum, with the emergence of Sanskritised Hindi and Urdu adopting more Persian influences.

Urdu had been used as a literary medium for British colonial Indian writers from the Bombay, Bengal, Orissa, and Hyderabad State as well.

=== Post-Partition ===
Before independence, Muslim League leader Muhammad Ali Jinnah advocated the use of Urdu, which he used as a symbol of national cohesion in Pakistan. Like other Muslim religious and political leaders, The scholar and linguist Maulvi Abdul Haq, who has been called Baba-e-Urdu (Father of Urdu), also reinforced support for Urdu as the national language of Pakistan, calling it the lingua franca and a unifying force of the country. Abdul Haq also stated: "Urdu Language placed the first brick in the foundation of Pakistan."

In the early years of Pakistan, the finance departments, bureaucracy, and other major institutions of the country were mostly managed by Urdu-speaking population of the country. After the Bengali language movement and the separation of former East Pakistan, Urdu was recognised as the sole national language of Pakistan in 1973, although English and regional languages were also granted official recognition. When the 1972 language violence in Sindh occurred, the poet Rais Amrohvi, who played a significant role in promoting Urdu and supporting the Urdu-speaking population of Pakistan, wrote his famous poem Urdu ka janaza hai zara dhoom say niklay (It's Urdu's funeral, make it befitting!) as a tribute to the language. Following the 1979 Soviet Invasion of Afghanistan and subsequent arrival of millions of Afghan refugees who have lived in Pakistan for many decades, many Afghans, including those who moved back to Afghanistan, have also become fluent in Hindi–Urdu, an occurrence aided by exposure to the Indian media, chiefly Hindi–Urdu Bollywood films and songs.

There have been attempts to purge Urdu of native Prakrit and Sanskrit words, and Hindi of Persian loanwords – new vocabulary draws primarily from Persian and Arabic for Urdu and from Sanskrit for Hindi. English has exerted a heavy influence on both as a co-official language. According to Bruce (2021), Urdu has adapted English words since the eighteenth century. A movement towards the hyper-Persianisation of an Urdu emerged in Pakistan since its independence in 1947 which is "as artificial as" the hyper-Sanskritised Hindi that has emerged in India; hyper-Persianisation of Urdu was prompted in part by the increasing Sanskritisation of Hindi. However, the style of Urdu spoken on a day-to-day basis in Pakistan is akin to neutral Hindustani that serves as the lingua franca of the northern Indian subcontinent.

In India, since at least 1977, some commentators, such as journalist Khushwant Singh, have characterised Urdu as a 'dying language.' However, others, such as Indian poet and writer Gulzar—who is popular in both countries and both language communities but writes only in Urdu (script) and has difficulties reading Devanagari, so he lets others transcribe his work—disagree with this assessment and state that Urdu 'is the most alive language and moving ahead with times' in India. This phenomenon pertains to the decrease in relative and absolute numbers of native Urdu speakers as opposed to speakers of other languages; declining (advanced) knowledge of Urdu's Perso-Arabic script, Urdu vocabulary and grammar; the role of translation and transliteration of literature from and into Urdu; the shifting cultural image of Urdu and socio-economic status associated with Urdu speakers (which negatively impacts especially their employment opportunities in both countries), the de jure legal status and de facto political status of Urdu, how much Urdu is used as language of instruction and chosen by students in higher education, and how the maintenance and development of Urdu is financially and institutionally supported by governments and NGOs. In India, although Urdu is not and never was used exclusively by Muslims (and Hindi never exclusively by Hindus), the ongoing Hindi–Urdu controversy and modern cultural association of each language with the two religions has led to fewer Hindus using Urdu. In the 20th century, Indian Muslims gradually began to collectively embrace Urdu (for example, 'post-independence Muslim politics of Bihar saw a mobilisation around the Urdu language as tool of empowerment for minorities especially coming from weaker socio-economic backgrounds'), but in the early 21st century an increasing percentage of Indian Muslims began switching to Hindi due to socio-economic factors, such as Urdu being abandoned as the language of instruction in much of India, and having limited employment opportunities compared to Hindi, English and regional languages. The number of Urdu speakers in India fell 1.5% between 2001 and 2011 (then 5.08 million Urdu speakers), especially in the most Urdu-speaking states of Uttar Pradesh (c. 8% to 5%) and Bihar (c. 11.5% to 8.5%), even though the number of Muslims in these two states grew in the same period. Although Urdu is still very prominent in early 21st-century Indian pop culture, ranging from Bollywood to social media, knowledge of the Urdu script and the publication of books in Urdu have steadily declined, while policies of the Indian government do not actively support the preservation of Urdu in professional and official spaces. Because during the partition, Urdu became the national language of Pakistan, the Indian state and some religious nationalists began in part to regard Urdu as a 'foreign' language, to be viewed with suspicion. Urdu advocates in India disagree whether it should be allowed to write Urdu in the Devanagari and Latin script (Roman Urdu) to allow its survival, or whether this will only hasten its demise and that the language can only be preserved if expressed in the Perso-Arabic script. There are some Hindu poets in India who continue to write in Urdu after the partition, including Gopi Chand Narang and Gulzar Dehlvi. Throughout India, various states have established an Urdu Academy to promote the use of Urdu and Urdu literature.

For Pakistan, Urdu originally had the image of a refined, elite language of the Enlightenment, progress, and emancipation, and the language contributed to the success of Pakistan's independence movement. But after the 1947 Partition, when it was chosen as the national language of Pakistan to unite all inhabitants with one linguistic identity, it faced serious competition primarily from Bengali (spoken by 56% of the total population, mostly in East Pakistan until that attained independence in 1971 as Bangladesh), and after 1971 from English. Both pro-independence elites that formed the leadership of the Muslim League in Pakistan and the Hindu-dominated Congress Party in India had been educated in English during the British colonial period, and continued to operate in English and send their children to English-medium schools as they continued dominate both countries' post-Partition politics. Although the Anglicized elite in Pakistan has made attempts at Urduisation of education with varying degrees of success, no successful attempts were ever made to Urduise politics, the legal system, the army, or the economy, all of which remained solidly Anglophone. Even the regime of general Zia-ul-Haq (1977–1988), who came from a middle-class Punjabi family and initially fervently supported a rapid and complete Urduisation of Pakistani society (earning him the honorary title of the 'Patron of Urdu' in 1981), failed to make significant achievements, and by 1987 had abandoned most of his efforts in favour of pro-English policies. Since the 1960s, the Urdu lobby and eventually the Urdu language in Pakistan has been associated with religious Islamism and political national conservatism (and eventually the lower and lower-middle classes, alongside regional languages such as Punjabi, Sindhi, and Balochi), while English has been associated with the internationally oriented secular and progressive left (and eventually the upper and upper-middle classes). Despite governmental attempts at Urduisation of Pakistan, the position and prestige of English only grew stronger in the meantime.

== Demographics and geographic distribution ==
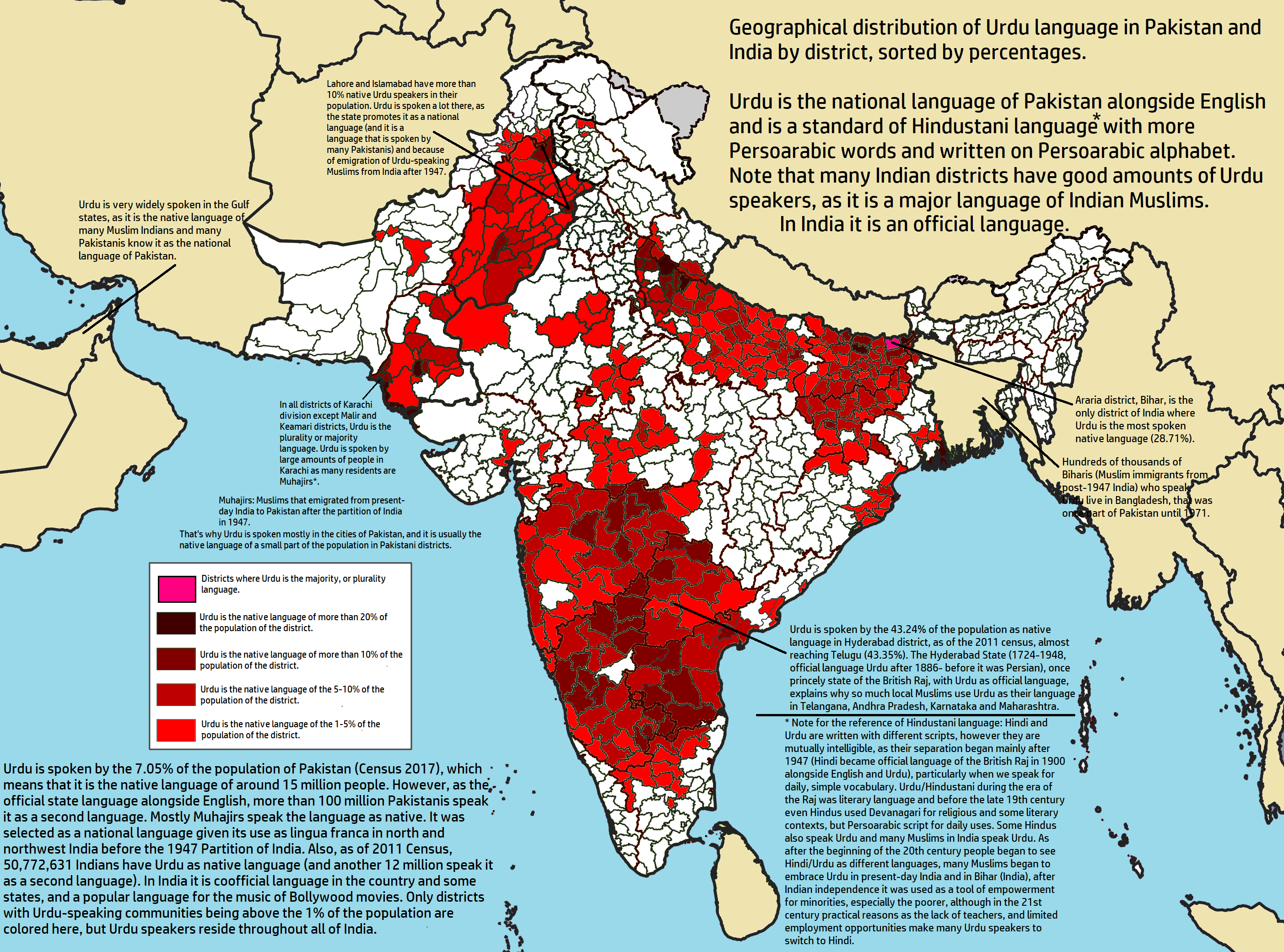
Geographical distribution of Urdu in India and Pakistan.

There are over 100 million native speakers of Urdu in India and Pakistan together: there were 50.8 million Urdu speakers in India (4.34% of the total population) as per the 2011 census; and approximately 22.3 million in Pakistan (9.25% of the total population) in 2023. There are several hundred thousand in the United Kingdom, Saudi Arabia, United States, and Bangladesh. However, Hindustani, of which Urdu is one variety, is spoken much more widely, forming the third most commonly spoken language in the world, after Mandarin and English. The syntax (grammar), morphology, and the core vocabulary of Urdu and Hindi are essentially identical – thus linguists usually count them as one single language, while some contend that they are considered as two different languages for socio-political reasons.

Owing to interaction with other languages, Urdu has become localised wherever it is spoken, including in Pakistan. Though Urdu is spoken by many Muhajirs in its standard form. In some areas, it has borrowed words from regional languages, giving the language a peculiar regional flavor. Similarly, the Urdu spoken in India can also be distinguished into many dialects such as the Standard Urdu of Lucknow and Delhi, as well as the Dakhni (Deccan) of South India. Because of Urdu's similarity to Hindi, speakers of the two languages can easily understand one another if both sides refrain from using literary vocabulary.

=== Pakistan ===
The proportion of people with Urdu as their mother tongue in each Pakistani district as of the 2023 Pakistani census.

Although Urdu is widely spoken and understood throughout all of Pakistan as the national language, only 9.25% of the population reported it as their mother tongue, according to the 2023 Pakistani census. Most of the nearly three million Afghan refugees of different ethnic origins (such as Pashtun, Tajik, Uzbek, Hazarvi, and Turkmen) who stayed in Pakistan for over twenty-five years have also become fluent in Urdu. Muhajirs since 1947 have historically formed the majority population in the city of Karachi, however. Many newspapers are published in Urdu in Pakistan, including the Daily Jang, Nawa-i-Waqt, and Millat.

Urdu is spoken as the first language of many people among the community known as Muhajirs (a multi-origin ethnic group of Pakistan), who left India after independence in 1947; these Muhajirs were from various parts of India, with Urdu speakers predominantly hailing from United Provinces (Uttar Pradesh), Delhi, Central Provinces (Madhya Pradesh), Bihar and Hyderabad. Other communities, most notably the Punjabi elite of Pakistan, have adopted Urdu as a mother tongue and identify with both an Urdu speaker as well as Punjabi identity. Urdu has served as a lingua franca, especially among Muslims in north and northwest British India, as well as in Hyderabad State. It is written, spoken and used in all provinces/territories of Pakistan, and together with English as the main languages of instruction, although the people from differing provinces may have different native languages.

Urdu is taught as a compulsory subject up to higher secondary school in both English and Urdu medium school systems, which has produced millions of second-language Urdu speakers among people whose native language is one of the other languages of Pakistan – which in turn has led to the absorption of vocabulary from various regional Pakistani languages, while some Urdu vocabularies has also been assimilated by Pakistan's regional languages. Some who are from a non-Urdu background now can read and write only Urdu. With such a large number of people(s) speaking Urdu, the language has acquired a peculiar regional flavor further distinguishing it from the Urdu spoken by native speakers, resulting in more diversity within the language.

=== India ===
In India, Urdu is spoken in places where there are large Muslim minorities or cities that were bases for Muslim empires in the past. These include parts of Uttar Pradesh, Madhya Pradesh, Bihar, Telangana, Andhra Pradesh, Maharashtra (Marathwada and Konkanis), Karnataka and cities such as Hyderabad, Lucknow, Delhi, Malerkotla, Bareilly, Meerut, Saharanpur, Muzaffarnagar, Roorkee, Deoband, Moradabad, Azamgarh, Bijnor, Najibabad, Rampur, Aligarh, Allahabad, Gorakhpur, Agra, Firozabad, Kanpur, Badaun, Bhopal, Hyderabad, Aurangabad, Bangalore, Kolkata, Mysore, Patna, Darbhanga, Gaya, Madhubani, Samastipur, Siwan, Saharsa, Supaul, Muzaffarpur, Nalanda, Munger, Bhagalpur, Araria, Gulbarga, Parbhani, Nanded, Malegaon, Bidar, Ajmer, and Ahmedabad. In a very significant number among the nearly 800 districts of India, there is a small Urdu-speaking minority at least. In Araria district, Bihar, there is a plurality of Urdu speakers and near-plurality in Hyderabad district, Telangana (43.35% Telugu speakers and 43.24% Urdu speakers).

Some Indian Muslim schools (Madrasa) teach Urdu as a first language and have their own syllabi and exams. In fact, the language of Bollywood films tend to contain a large number of Persian and Arabic words and thus considered to be "Urdu" in a sense, especially in songs.

India has more than 3,000 Urdu publications, including 405 daily Urdu newspapers. Newspapers such as Neshat News Urdu, Sahara Urdu, Daily Salar, Hindustan Express, Daily Pasban, Siasat Daily, The Munsif Daily and Inqilab are published and distributed in Bangalore, Malegaon, Mysore, Hyderabad, and Mumbai.

=== Elsewhere ===
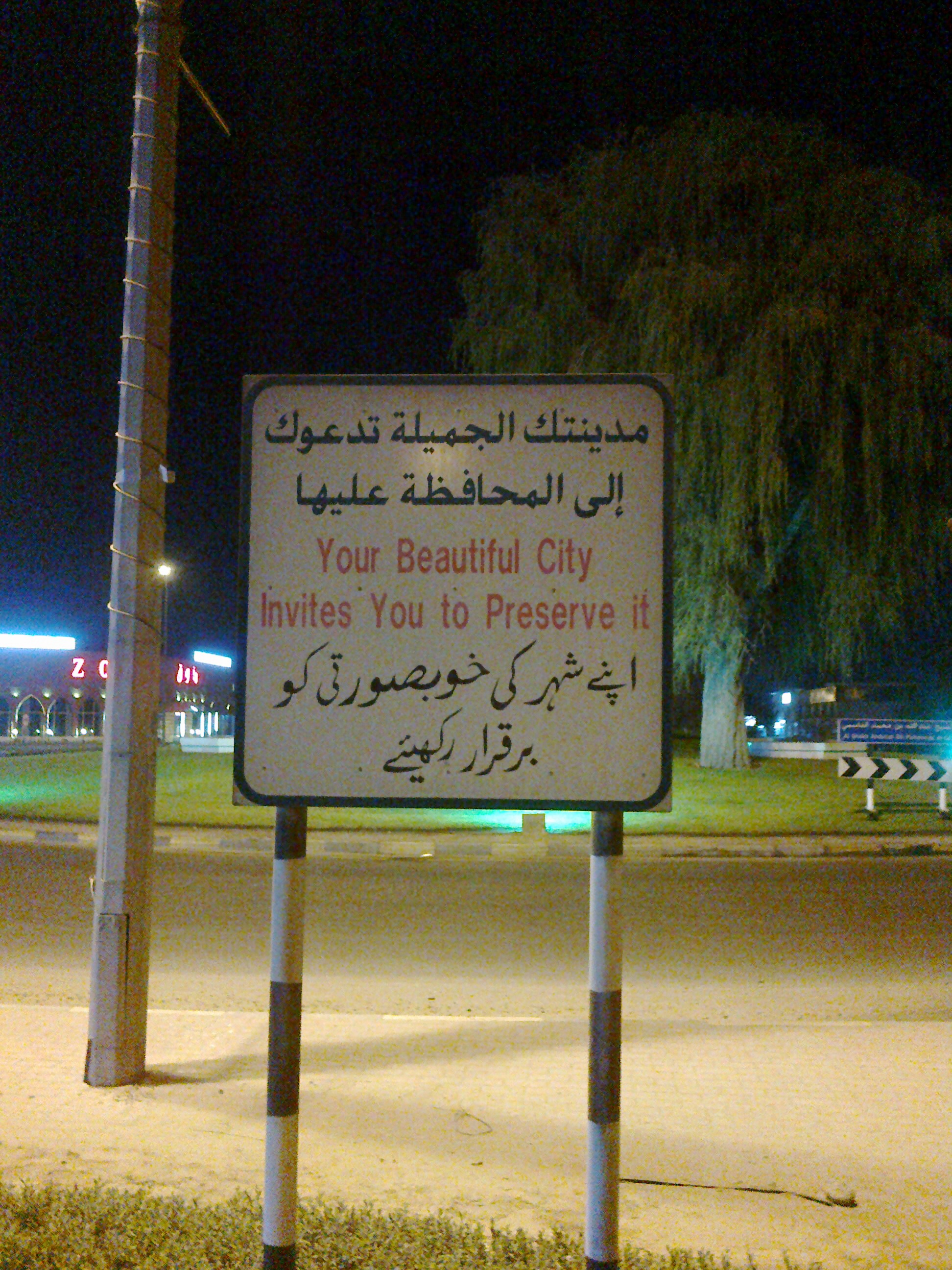
A trilingual signboard in Arabic, English and Urdu in the UAE. The Urdu sentence is not a direct translation of the English ("Your beautiful city invites you to preserve it") or Arabic (the same). It says, "apné shahar kī Khūbsūrtīi ko barqarār rakhié, or "Please preserve the beauty of your city."

In Nepal, Urdu is a registered regional dialect and in South Africa, it is a protected language in the constitution. It is also spoken as a minority language in Afghanistan and Bangladesh, with no official status.

Outside South Asia, it is spoken by large numbers of migrant South Asian workers in the major urban centres of the Persian Gulf countries. Urdu is also spoken by large numbers of immigrants and their children in the major urban centres of the United Kingdom, the United States, Canada, Germany, New Zealand, Norway, and Australia. Along with Arabic, Urdu is among the immigrant languages with the most speakers in Catalonia.

== Cultural identity ==
=== Colonial India ===
Religious and social atmospheres in early nineteenth century India played a significant role in the linguistic divide of Hindi–Urdu continuum. Urdu and Hindi were differentiated from a shared linguistic continuum into distinct linguistic identities, becoming associated with Muslim and Hindu identities, respectively. Urdu's use was not confined only to northern India – it had been used as a literary medium for Indian writers from the Bombay Presidency, Bengal, Orissa Province, and Tamil Nadu as well.

As Urdu and Hindi became means of religious and social construction for Muslims and Hindus respectively, each register developed its own script. According to Islamic tradition, Arabic, the language of Muhammad and the Qur'an, holds spiritual significance and power. Because Urdu was intentioned as means of unification for Muslims in Northern India and later Pakistan, it adopted a modified Perso-Arabic script.

=== Pakistan ===
Urdu has played a central role in shaping Pakistan’s national identity, holding symbolic significance as a cultural identity in the country’s formation and as a common lingua franca. Because of its use in a variety of contexts such as literature, government and religion, Urdu is often considered to be closely tied to the cultural heritage of Pakistan. At the country's founding, the variety of languages and dialects spoken throughout the regions of Pakistan produced an imminent need for a uniting language. Urdu was chosen as a symbol of unity for the new Dominion of Pakistan in 1947, and it had already served as a lingua franca among Muslims in north and northwest of British Indian Empire.

While Urdu and the Muslim identity of the Indian subcontinent together played important roles in developing the national identity of Pakistan, disputes in the 1950s (particularly those in East Pakistan, where Bengali was the dominant language), challenged the idea of Urdu as a national symbol and its practicality as the lingua franca. The significance of Urdu as a national symbol was downplayed by these disputes when English and Bengali were also accepted as official languages in the former East Pakistan (now Bangladesh).

== Official status ==
=== Pakistan ===
Urdu is the sole national, and one of the two official languages of Pakistan (along with English). It is spoken and understood throughout the country, whereas the state-by-state languages (languages spoken throughout various regions) are the provincial languages, although only 9.25% of Pakistanis speak Urdu as their first language. Its official status has meant that Urdu is understood and spoken widely throughout Pakistan as a second or third language. It is used in education, literature, office and court business, although in practice, English is used instead of Urdu in the higher echelons of government. Article 251(1) of the Pakistani Constitution mandates that Urdu be implemented as the sole language of government, though English continues to be the most widely used language at the higher echelons of Pakistani government.

=== India ===
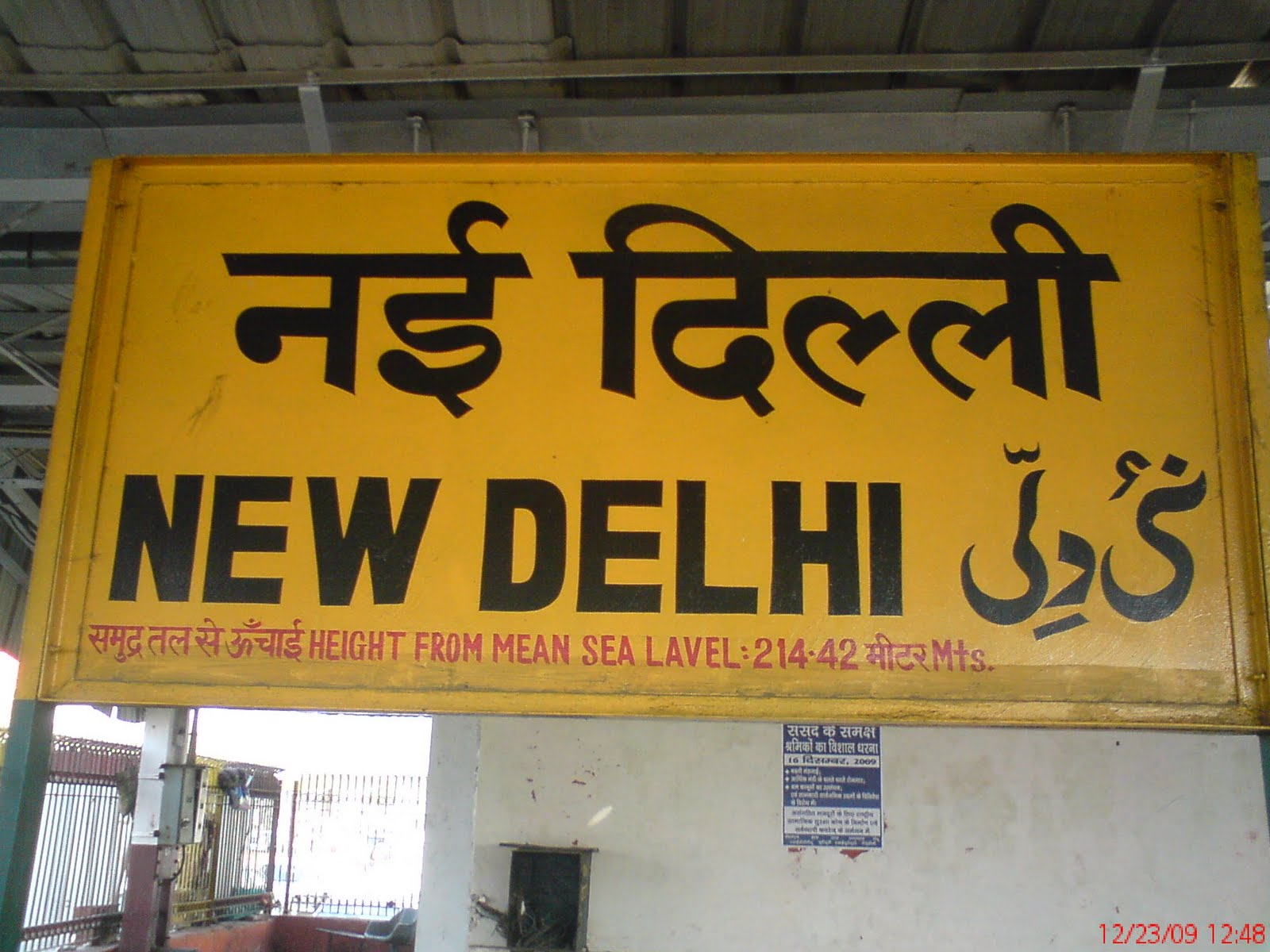
A multilingual New Delhi railway station board. The Urdu and Hindi texts both read as: naī dillī.

Urdu is also one of the officially recognised languages in India and also has the status of "additional official language" in the Indian states of Andhra Pradesh, Uttar Pradesh, Bihar, Jharkhand, West Bengal, Telangana and the national capital territory Delhi. It is also one of the five official languages of Jammu and Kashmir.

India established the governmental Bureau for the Promotion of Urdu in 1969, although the Central Hindi Directorate was established earlier in 1960, and the promotion of Hindi is better funded and more advanced, while the status of Urdu has been undermined by the promotion of Hindi. Private Indian organisations such as the Anjuman-e-Tariqqi Urdu, Deeni Talimi Council and Urdu Mushafiz Dasta promote the use and preservation of Urdu, with the Anjuman successfully launching a campaign that reintroduced Urdu as an official language of Bihar in the 1970s. In the former Jammu and Kashmir state, section 145 of the Kashmir Constitution stated: "The official language of the State shall be Urdu but the English language shall unless the Legislature by law otherwise provides, continue to be used for all the official purposes of the State for which it was being used immediately before the commencement of the Constitution."

== Dialects ==
Urdu became a literary language in the 18th century and two similar standard forms came into existence in Delhi and Lucknow. Since the partition of India in 1947, a third standard has arisen in the Pakistani city of Karachi. Deccani, an older form used in southern India, became a court language of the Deccan sultanates by the 16th century. Urdu has a few recognised dialects, including Dakhni, Dhakaiya, Rekhta, and Modern Vernacular Urdu (based on the Khariboli dialect of the Delhi region). Dakhni (also known as Dakani, Deccani, Desia, Mirgan) is spoken in Deccan region of southern India. It is distinct by its mixture of vocabulary from Marathi and Konkani, as well as some vocabulary from Arabic, Persian and Chagatai that are not found in the standard dialect of Urdu. Dakhini is widely spoken in all parts of Maharashtra, Telangana, Andhra Pradesh and Karnataka. Urdu is read and written as in other parts of India. A number of daily newspapers and several monthly magazines in Urdu are published in these states.

Dhakaiya Urdu is a dialect native to the city of Old Dhaka in Bangladesh, dating back to the Mughal era. However, its popularity, even among native speakers, has been gradually declining since the Bengali language movement in the 20th century. It is not officially recognised by the Government of Bangladesh. The Urdu spoken by Stranded Pakistanis in Bangladesh is different from this dialect.

=== Code switching ===
Many bilingual or multi-lingual Urdu speakers, being familiar with both Urdu and English, display code-switching (referred to as "Urdish") in certain localities and between certain social groups. On 14 August 2015, the Government of Pakistan launched the Ilm Pakistan movement, with a uniform curriculum in Urdish. Ahsan Iqbal, Federal Minister of Pakistan, said "Now the government is working on a new curriculum to provide a new medium to the students which will be the combination of both Urdu and English and will name it Urdish."

== Comparison with Modern Standard Hindi ==
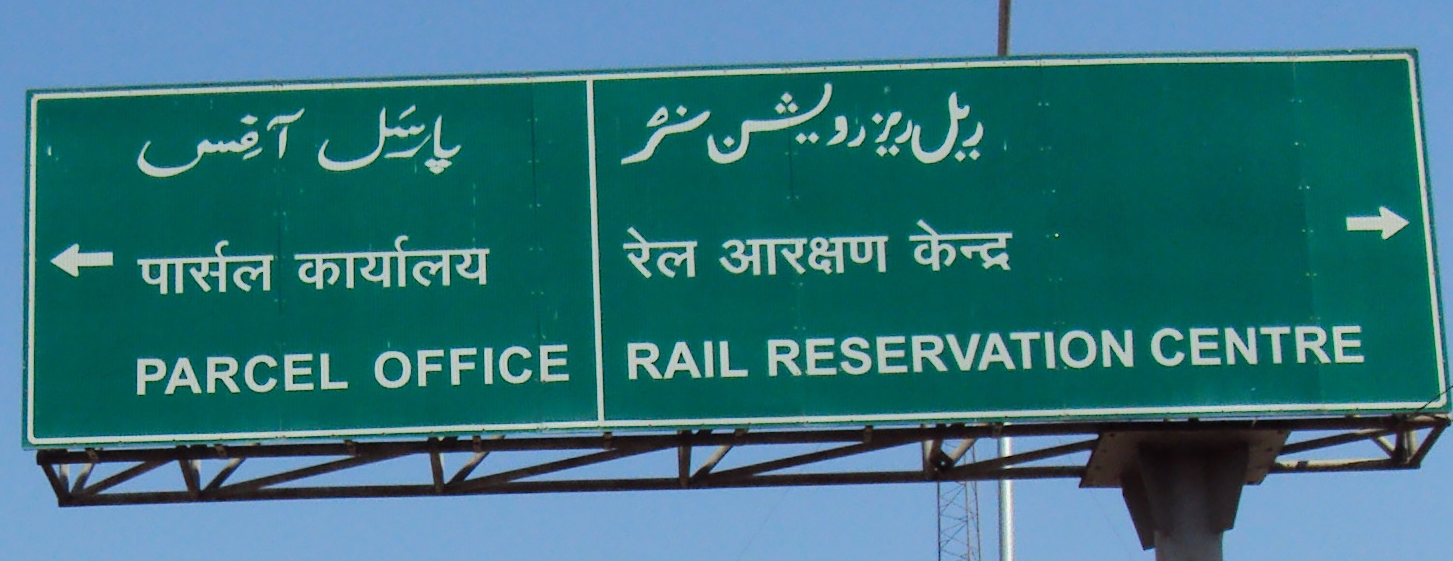
Urdu and Hindi on a road sign in India. The Urdu version is a direct transliteration of the English; the Hindi is a part transliteration ("parcel" and "rail") and part translation: "karyalay" and "arakshan kendra"

Standard Urdu is often compared with Standard Hindi. Both Urdu and Hindi, which are considered standard registers of the same language, Hindustani (or Hindi–Urdu), share a core vocabulary and grammar.

Apart from religious associations, the differences are largely restricted to the standard forms: Standard Urdu is conventionally written in the Nastaliq style of the Persian alphabet and relies heavily on Persian and Arabic as a source for technical and literary vocabulary, whereas Standard Hindi is conventionally written in Devanāgarī and draws on Sanskrit. However, both share a core vocabulary of native Sanskrit and Prakrit derived words and a significant number of Arabic and Persian loanwords, with a consensus of linguists considering them to be two standardised forms of the same language and consider the differences to be sociolinguistic; a few classify them separately. The two languages are often considered to be a single language (Hindustani or Hindi–Urdu) on a dialect continuum ranging from Persianised to Sanskritised vocabulary, but now they are more and more different in words due to politics. Old Urdu dictionaries also contain most of the Sanskrit words now present in Hindi.

Mutual intelligibility decreases in literary and specialised contexts that rely on academic or technical vocabulary. In a longer conversation, differences in formal vocabulary and pronunciation of some Urdu phonemes are noticeable, though many native Hindi speakers also pronounce these phonemes. At a phonological level, speakers of both languages are frequently aware of the Perso-Arabic or Sanskrit origins of their word choice, which affects the pronunciation of those words. Urdu speakers will often insert vowels to break up consonant clusters found in words of Sanskritic origin, but will pronounce them correctly in Arabic and Persian loanwords. As a result of religious nationalism since the partition of British India and continued communal tensions, native speakers of both Hindi and Urdu frequently assert that they are distinct languages.

The grammar of Hindi and Urdu is shared, though formal Urdu makes more use of the Persian "-e-" izafat grammatical construct (as in Hammam-e-Qadimi, or Nishan-e-Haider) than does Hindi.

== Urdu speakers by country ==
The following table shows the number of Urdu speakers in some countries.

Country	Population	Native language speakers	%	Second-language speakers	%
India	1,296,834,042	50,772,631	3.9	12,151,715	0.9
Pakistan	241,499,431	22,249,307	9.25	164,000,000	77%
Saudi Arabia	33,091,113	–	2.3	930,000	–
Nepal	29,717,587	414,000	2.3	–	–
Afghanistan	38,347,000	–	–	733,000	–
Bangladesh	159,453,001	300,000	0.1	–	–
United Kingdom	65,105,246	269,000	0.4	–	–
United States	329,256,465	397,502	0.1	–	–
United Arab Emirates	9,890,400	300,000	3.0	1,500,000	15.1
Canada	35,881,659	243,090	0.6	–	–
Australia	25,422,788	111,873	0.4	–	–
Ireland	4,761,865	5,336	0.1	–	–

== Phonology ==
=== Consonants ===
Consonant phonemes of Urdu
		Labial	Dental/ Alveolar	Retroflex	Palatal	Velar	Uvular	Glottal
Nasal		m م	n ن			ŋ (‌‌ں)		
Plosive/ Affricate	voiceless	p پ	t ت	ʈ ٹ	tʃ چ	k ک	(q) ق	
Plosive/ Affricate	voiceless aspirated	pʰ پھ	tʰ تھ	ʈʰ ٹھ	tʃʰ چھ	kʰ کھ		
Plosive/ Affricate	voiced	b ب	d د	ɖ ڈ	dʒ ج	ɡ گ		
Plosive/ Affricate	voiced aspirated	bʱ بھ	dʱ دھ	ɖʱ ڈھ	dʒʱ جھ	gʱ گھ		
Fricative	voiceless	f ف	s س		ʃ ش	x خ		ɦ ہ
Fricative	voiced	ʋ و	z ز		(ʒ) ژ	(ɣ) غ		
Approximant		ʋ و	l ل		j ی			
Vibrant	plain		r ر	ɽ ڑ				
Vibrant	voiced aspirated			ɽʱ ڑھ				

Notes

- Marginal and non-universal phonemes are in parentheses.
- /ɣ/ is post-velar.

=== Vowels ===
Urdu vowels
		Front		Central		Back	
		short	long	short	long	short	long
Close	oral	ɪ	iː			ʊ	uː
Close	nasal	ɪ̃	ĩː			ʊ̃	ũː
Close-mid	oral		eː	ə			oː
Close-mid	nasal		ẽː	ə̃			õː
Open-mid	oral	ɛ	ɛː			ɔ	ɔː
Open-mid	nasal		ɛ̃ː				ɔ̃ː
Open	oral		(æː)		aː		
Open	nasal		(æ̃ː)		ãː		

Notes

- This table contains a list of phones, not phonemes. In particular, [ɛ] is an allophone of /ə/ near /h/, and the short nasal vowels are not phonemic either.
- Marginal and non-universal vowels are in parentheses.

== Vocabulary ==
Syed Ahmed Dehlavi, a 19th-century lexicographer who compiled the Farhang-e-Asifiya Urdu dictionary, estimated that 75% of Urdu words have their etymological roots in Sanskrit and Prakrit, and approximately 99% of Urdu verbs have their roots in Sanskrit and Prakrit. Urdu has borrowed words from Persian and to a lesser extent, Arabic through Persian, to the extent of about 25% to 30% of Urdu's vocabulary. A table illustrated by the linguist Afroz Taj of the University of North Carolina at Chapel Hill likewise illustrates the number of Persian loanwords to native Sanskrit-derived words in literary Urdu as comprising a 1:4 ratio.

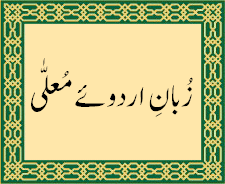
The phrase Zubān-e-Urdū-e-Muʿallā ("the language of the exalted camp") written in the Perso-Arabic script

The "trend towards Persianisation" started in the 18th century by the Delhi school of Urdu poets, though other writers, such as Meeraji, wrote in a Sanskritised form of the language. There has been a move towards hyper Persianisation in Pakistan since 1947, which has been adopted by much of the country's writers; as such, some Urdu texts can be composed of 70% Perso-Arabic loanwords just as some Persian texts can have 70% Arabic vocabulary. Some Pakistani Urdu speakers have incorporated Hindi vocabulary into their speech as a result of exposure to Indian entertainment. In India, Urdu has not diverged from Hindi as much as it has in Pakistan.

Most borrowed words in Urdu are nouns and adjectives. Many of the words of Arabic origin have been adopted through Persian, and have different pronunciations and nuances of meaning and usage than they do in Arabic. There are also a smaller number of borrowings from Portuguese. Some examples for Portuguese words borrowed into Urdu are chabi ("chave": key), girja ("igreja": church), kamra ("cámara": room).

Although the word Urdu is derived from the Turkic word ordu (army) or orda, from which English horde is also derived, Turkic borrowings in Urdu are minimal and Urdu is also not genetically related to the Turkic languages. Urdu words originating from Chagatai and Arabic were borrowed through Persian and hence are Persianised versions of the original words. For instance, the Arabic ta' marbuta ( ة ) changes to he ( ه ) or te ( ت ). (Note: An example can be seen in the word "need" in Urdu. Urdu uses the Persian version ضرورت rather than the original Arabic ضرورة. See: John T. Platts "A dictionary of Urdu, classical Hindi, and English" (1884) Page 749. Urdu and Hindi use Persian pronunciation in their loanwords, rather than that of Arabic– for instance rather than pronouncing ض as the emphatic consonant "ḍ", the original sound in Arabic, Urdu uses the Persian pronunciation "z". See: John T. Platts "A dictionary of Urdu, classical Hindi, and English" (1884) Page 748) Nevertheless, contrary to popular belief, Urdu did not borrow from the Turkish language, but from Chagatai, a Turkic language from Central Asia. Urdu and Turkish both borrowed from Arabic and Persian, hence the similarity in pronunciation of many Urdu and Turkish words.

== Formality ==
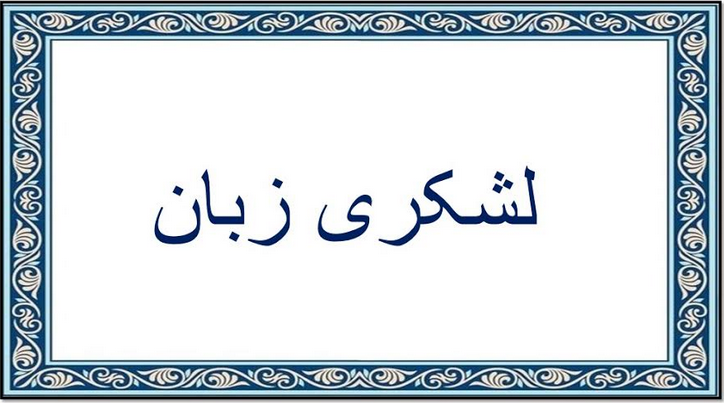
Lashkari Zabān title in Naskh script

Urdu in its less formalised register is known as rekhta (ریختہ, rek̤h̤tah, 'rough mixture', Urdu pronunciation: [reːxtaː]); the more formal register is sometimes referred to as زبانِ اُردُوئے معلّٰى, zabān-i Urdū-yi muʿallá, 'language of the exalted camp' (Urdu pronunciation: [zəbaːn eː ʊrdu eː moəllaː]) or لشکری زبان, lashkari zabān, 'military language' (Urdu pronunciation: [ləʃkəɾi: zəbɑ:n]), referring to the Imperial army or simply Lashkari. The etymology of the word used in Urdu, for the most part, decides how polite or refined one's speech is. For example, Urdu speakers distinguish between پانی, pānī and آب, āb, both meaning water. The former is used colloquially and has older Sanskrit origins; the latter is used formally and poetically, being of Persian origin.

If a word is of Persian or Arabic origin, the level of speech is considered to be more formal and grander. Similarly, if Persian or Arabic grammar constructs, such as the izafat, are used in Urdu, the level of speech is also considered more formal. If a word is inherited from Sanskrit, the level of speech is considered more colloquial and personal.

== Writing system ==
The Urdu alphabet, with transliterations in the Roman and Devanagari scripts

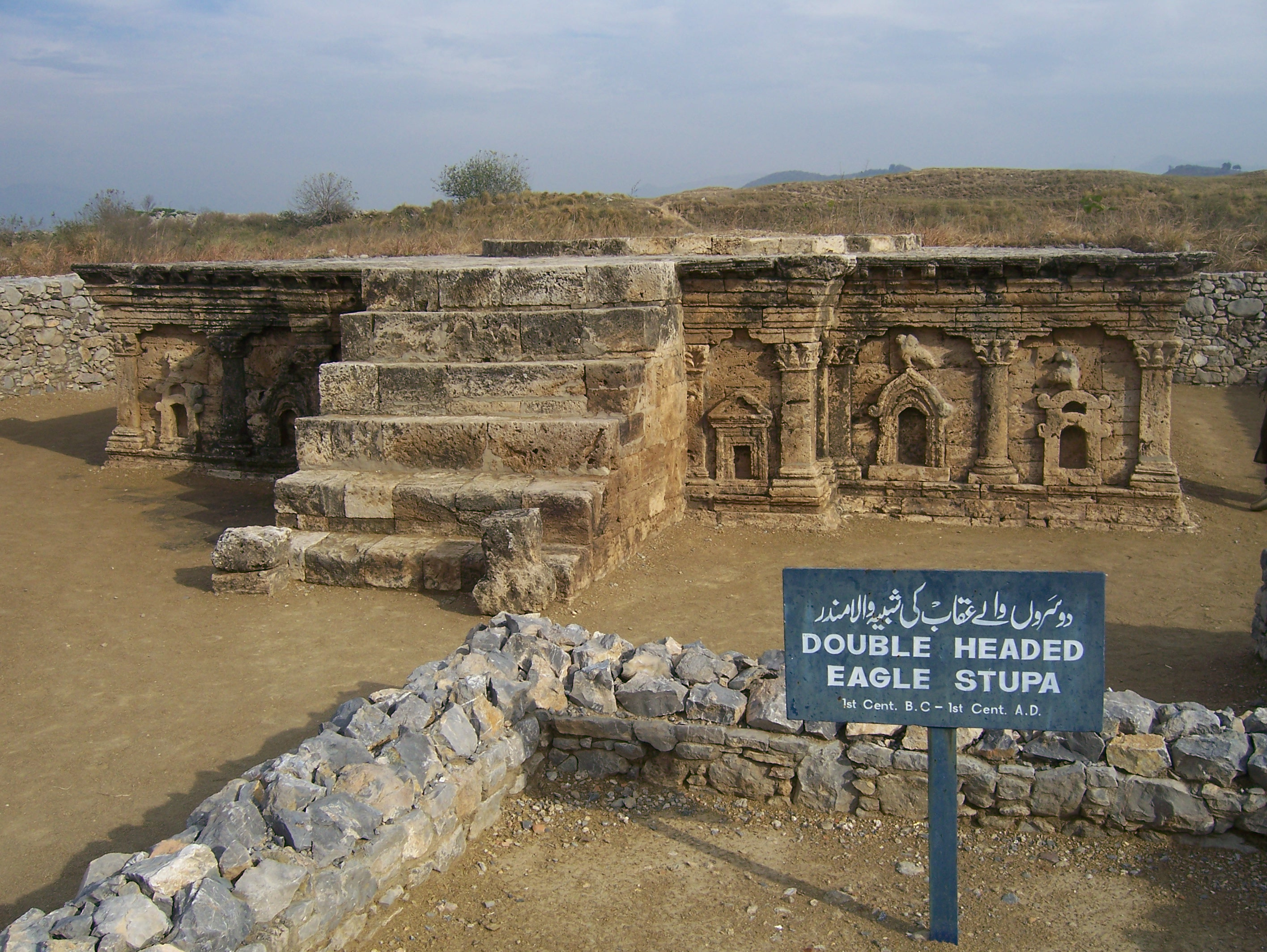
An English-Urdu bilingual sign at the archaeological site of Sirkap, near Taxila. The Urdu says: (right to left) دو سَروں والے عقاب کی شبيہ والا مندر, dō sarōñ wālé u'qāb kī shabīh wāla mandir. "The temple with the image of the eagle with two heads."

Urdu is written right-to left in an extension of the Persian alphabet, which is itself an extension of the Arabic alphabet. Urdu is associated with the Nastaʿlīq style of Persian calligraphy, whereas Arabic is generally written in the Naskh or Ruq'ah styles. Because of its thousands of ligatures, Nasta’liq is notoriously difficult to typeset, so Urdu newspapers were hand-written by masters of calligraphy, known as kātib or khush-nawīs, until the late 1980s. One handwritten Urdu newspaper, The Musalman, is still published daily in Chennai. InPage, a widely used desktop publishing tool for Urdu, has over 20,000 ligatures in its Nastaʿliq computer fonts.

A highly Persianised and technical form of Urdu was the lingua franca of the law courts of the British administration in Bengal and the North-West Provinces & Oudh. Until the late 19th century, all proceedings and court transactions in this register of Urdu were written officially in the Persian script.

=== Romanisation ===
ISO 15919 Romanisation of Urdu is a scholarly transliteration system that accurately represents the pronunciation of Urdu letters using diacritics and special markers for vowels and nasal sounds.

Roman Urdu is the writing of Urdu in the Latin script. It is the prevalent form of Urdu on social media. Pakistanis also frequently write other Pakistani languages in the Latin script online.

The romanised usage of Urdu dates back to 1804 in colonial India, when Romanised Urdu Bibles were published by the British and Foreign Bible Society and later, the Bible Society of India; these publications continue to be used in parts of Uttar Pradesh in present-day India.

=== Other scripts used ===
In 1880, Sir Ashley Eden, the Lieutenant-Governor of Bengal in colonial India abolished the use of the Persian alphabet in the law courts of Bengal and ordered the exclusive use of Kaithi, a popular script used for both Urdu and Hindi; in the Bihar Province, the court language was Urdu written in the Kaithi script. Kaithi's association with Urdu and Hindi was ultimately eliminated by the political contest between these languages and their scripts, in which the Persian script was definitively linked to Urdu.

More recently in India, Urdu speakers have adopted Devanagari for publishing Urdu periodicals and have innovated new strategies to mark Urdu in Devanagari as distinct from Hindi in Devanagari. Such publishers have introduced new orthographic features into Devanagari for the purpose of representing the Perso-Arabic etymology of Urdu words. One example is the use of अ (Devanagari a) with vowel signs to mimic contexts of ع (‘ain), in violation of Hindi orthographic rules. For Urdu publishers, the use of Devanagari gives them a greater audience, whereas the orthographic changes help them preserve a distinct identity of Urdu.

Some poets from Bengal, namely Qazi Nazrul Islam, have historically used the Bengali script to write Urdu poetry like Prem Nagar Ka Thikana Karle and Mera Beti Ki Khela, as well as bilingual Bengali-Urdu poems like Alga Koro Go Khõpar Bãdhon, Juboker Chholona and Mera Dil Betab Kiya. Dhakaiya Urdu is a colloquial non-standard dialect of Urdu which was typically not written. However, organisations seeking to preserve the dialect have begun transcribing the dialect in the Bengali script. (Note: Organisations like Dhakaiya Sobbasi Jaban and Dhakaiya Movement, among others, consistently write Dhakaiya Urdu using the Bengali script.)

== See also ==
- Urdu Digest
- Urdu in the United Kingdom
- Urdu Informatics
- Urdu keyboard
- Urdu poetry
- Urdu-speaking people
- Persian and Urdu
- Persian language in the Indian subcontinent
- States of India by Urdu speakers
- Uddin and Begum Hindustani Romanisation

=== Lists ===
- List of Urdu-language poets
- List of Urdu-language writers
