= Baṛī ye =

Letter of the Arabic script

Baṛī ye بَڑی يے
- ے
- ۓ

Usage
- Writing system: Arabic abjad Urdu alphabet Shahmukhi (Punjabi); Saraiki alphabet Balochi Standard Alphabet; Kashmiri alphabet Burushaski alphabet Khowar alphabet
- Type: Abjad; Alphabetic
- Language of origin: Urdu
- Sound values: /eː/ /ɛː/ /eɪ/
- In Unicode: U+06D2
- Alphabetical position: 38

History
Development
D36
         - ي
            - ی
              - ے
- Time period: ~1200 to present
- Descendants: ݺ ݻ ◌ެ (Note: Thaana vowel ebefili; thought to be derived from baṛī ye based on visual and phonetic similarities.)
- Sisters: I J Ι Ї י 𐤉 ܝ 𐡉 ◌ۦ (Note: Quranic notation symbols based on the returned yā’.) ◌ۧ See also: Yodh
- Transliterations: E Ai (digraph); Ei (digraph)
- Variations: ۓ

Other
- Writing direction: Right-to-left

Baṛī ye (Urdu: بَڑی يے, Urdu pronunciation: [ˈbəɽiː ˈjeː]; lit. 'greater ye'), also spelled bari ye, baree ye, barree ye, or badi ye, is a letter of the Arabic script, originally used in the Urdu alphabet, directly based on the alternative "returned" variant of the final form of the Arabic letter ye/yāʾ (known as yāʾ mardūda) found in the Hijazi, Kufic, Thuluth, Naskh, and Nastaliq scripts. It functions as the word-final yā-'e-majhūl ([eː]) and yā-'e-sākin ([ɛː]). It is distinguished from the "choṭī ye (چھوٹی يے; "lesser ye")", which is the regular Perso-Arabic yāʾ (ی) used elsewhere. In Punjabi, where it is a part of the Shahmukhi alphabet, it is called waḍḍī ye (Punjabi: وَڈّی یے), also meaning "greater ye". In the context of Urdu and Shahmukhi, it is written as ए/े (for yā-'e-majhūl) and ऐ/ै (for yā-'e-sākin) in Devanagari and ਏ/ੇ (for yā-'e-majhūl) and ਐ/ੈ (for yā-'e-sākin) in Gurmukhi.

== History ==
The baṛī ye is based on the stretched, horizontal, "returned" form of the Arabic yā’, originating in the Kufic and Hijazi script and also used occasionally in Thuluth, Naskh, and Nastaliq calligraphy. The form began to be used in this manner for Classical Persian in India, for example کسی kasē ("someone") was often written as کسے.

== Forms ==
Baṛī ye is written multiple ways depending on its position:

| Position in word: | Isolated | Final | Medial | Initial |
|---|---|---|---|---|
| Naskh glyph form: (Help) | ے | ـے | ـے | ے |
| Nastaliq glyph form: | ے | ــــے | ــــے | ے |

There are also medial (ـیـ) and initial (یـ) forms, but they are not encoded on Unicode and are generally represented by the regular ye.

In the Balochi Standard Alphabet, baṛī ye (or cappi yà as it is known in Balochi) has the forms ⟨ࢩـ ـࢩـ ـے ے⟩.

== Diacritical variants ==
In Urdu, only the hamza can be applied to baṛī ye. This is used when the word ending with the letter bears an izāfat.

| Position in word: | Isolated | Final | Medial | Initial |
|---|---|---|---|---|
| Naskh glyph form: (Help) | ۓ | ـۓ | ـۓ | ۓ |
| Nastaliq glyph form: | ۓ | ــــۓ | ــــۓ | ۓ |

In Kashmiri, there is a letter that is visually a baṛī ye with a small v sign above, known as the nīmü yāyūk:

| Position in word: | Isolated | Final | Medial | Initial |
|---|---|---|---|---|
| Naskh glyph form: (Help) | ےٚ | ـےٚ | ـےٚـ | ےٚـ |
| Nastaliq glyph form: | ےٚ | ــــےٚ | ــــےٚــــ | ےٚــــ |

=== Burushaski ===
In Burushaski, there are 3 baṛī ye's: ے, ݺ, and ݻ.

One of the additional letters is a baṛī ye with the Arabic–Indic digit 2 (۲).

| Position in word: | Isolated | Final | Medial | Initial |
|---|---|---|---|---|
| Naskh glyph form: (Help) | ݺ | ـݺ | ـݺـ | ݺـ |
| Nastaliq glyph form: | ݺ | ــــݺ | ــــݺــــ | ݺــــ |

It is used to represent the short vowel /e/.

Another letter has a 3 (۳) above it. Unlike ݺ, which represents a shorter sound than the regular baṛī ye, it represents the same long vowel (/eː/) but with primary stress (e.g. /ˈeː/).

| Position in word: | Isolated | Final | Medial | Initial |
|---|---|---|---|---|
| Naskh glyph form: (Help) | ݻ | ـݻ | ـݻـ | ݻـ |
| Nastaliq glyph form: | ݻ | ــــݻ | ــــݻــــ | ݻــــ |

== Character encoding ==
Character information
| Preview | ؖ | | ے | | ۓ | | ݺ | | ݻ | |
|---|---|---|---|---|---|---|---|---|---|---|
| Unicode name | ARABIC SMALL HIGH LIGATURE ALEF WITH YEH BARREE | | ARABIC LETTER YEH BARREE | | ARABIC LETTER YEH BARREE WITH HAMZA ABOVE | | ARABIC LETTER YEH BARREE WITH EXTENDED ARABIC-INDIC DIGIT TWO ABOVE | | ARABIC LETTER YEH BARREE WITH EXTENDED ARABIC-INDIC DIGIT THREE ABOVE | |
| Encodings | decimal | hex | dec | hex | dec | hex | dec | hex | dec | hex |
| Unicode | 1558 | U+0616 | 1746 | U+06D2 | 1747 | U+06D3 | 1914 | U+077A | 1915 | U+077B |
| UTF-8 | 216 150 | D8 96 | 219 146 | DB 92 | 219 147 | DB 93 | 221 186 | DD BA | 221 187 | DD BB |
| Numeric character reference | &#1558; | &#x616; | &#1746; | &#x6D2; | &#1747; | &#x6D3; | &#1914; | &#x77A; | &#1915; | &#x77B; |
