= Crimean Tatar alphabet =

Alphabet of the Crimean Tatar language

Crimean Tatar is written in both the Latin and Cyrillic scripts. Before 1928, the Perso-Arabic script was the main orthography.

Before the official introduction of the Common Turkic-based Latin alphabet by the Verkhovna Rada of Crimea in the 1990s, the Cyrillic alphabet was the main orthography. After the 2014 Russian annexation of Crimea, the Russian government required solely the use of the Cyrillic script. In 2021, the Ukrainian government began the transition to the Latin script.

The Tatars of Romania use a different orthography. The letters Á, Ç, Ğ, Í, Î, Ñ, Ó, Ş, and Ú were added in the Dobrujan Tatar orthography in 1956.

== History ==
=== Arabic script ===
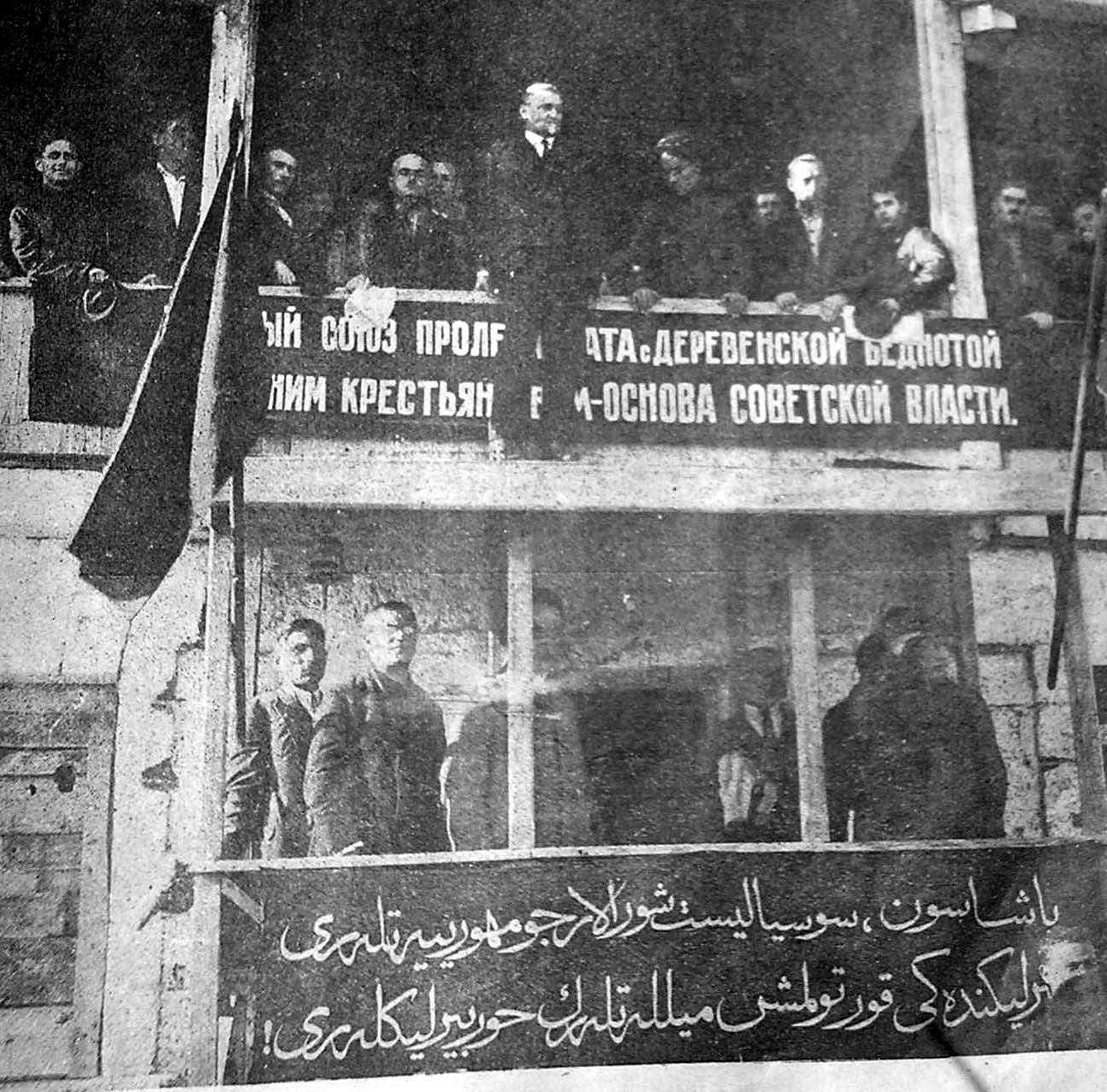
An example of Crimean Tatar Arabic script. (Alexander Schlichter speaking during the celebration of the "five years of the liberation of Crimea", 1924)

Crimean Tatars used the Perso-Arabic script from the 16th century to 1928, when it was replaced by the Latin alphabet based on Yañalif. The Crimean variant contained a couple of modified Arabic letters.

Prior to its replacement, same as and in parallel with several other Arabic-based orthographies of Turkic and Caucasian languages across the Soviet Union, several improvements and standardizations were introduced in order to make the writing more clear and more closely matching spoken pronunciations, the first one being adopted in 1921, and the second in 1924.

Below table lists the letters used in Crimean Tatar Arabic script.

Isolated	Final	Medial	Initial	Name	Modern Latin
ا	ـا	—		elif (елиф)	a, â
ﺀ	—			hemze (хемзе)	-
ب	ـب	ـبـ	بـ	be (бе)	b, p (word-finally)
پ	ـپ	ـپـ	پـ	pe (пе)	p
ت	ـت	ـتـ	تـ	te (те)	t
ث	ـث	ـثـ	ثـ	se (се)	s
ج	ـج	ـجـ	جـ	cim (джим)	c
چ	ـچ	ـچـ	چـ	çim (чим)	ç
ﺡ	ـح	ـحـ	حـ	ha (ха)	-
ﺥ	ـخ	ـخـ	خـ	hı (хы)	h
د	ـد	—		dal (дал)	d
ذ	ـذ	—		zal (зал)	z
ر	ـر	—		re (ре)	r
ز	ـز	—		ze (зе)	z
ژ	ـژ	—		je (же)	j
س	ـس	ـسـ	سـ	sin (син)	s
ش	ـش	ـشـ	شـ	şin (шин)	ş
ص	ـص	ـصـ	صـ	sad (сад)	s
ض	ـض	ـضـ	ضـ	zad (зад)	d, z
ط	ـط	ـطـ	طـ	ta (та)	t
ظ	ـظ	ـظـ	ظـ	za (за)	z
ع	ـع	ـعـ	عـ	ayn (айн)	^{1}
غ	ـغ	ـغـ	غـ	ğayn (гъайн)	ğ
ف	ـف	ـفـ	فـ	fe (фе)	f
ق	ـق	ـقـ	قـ	qaf (къаф)	q
ك	ـك	ـكـ	كـ	kef (kef-i arabiy) (кеф) (кеф-и арабий)	k (g, ñ)^{2}
ڭ	ـڭ	ـڭـ	ڭـ	nef (kef-i nuniy, sağır kef) (неф) (кеф-и нуний, сагъыр кеф)	ñ
گ	ـگ	ـگـ	گـ	gef (kef-i farsiy) (геф) (кеф-и фарсий)	g
ࢰ	ـࢰ	ـࢰـ	ࢰـ	kef-i yayiy (кеф-и яйий)	y^{3}
ل	ـل	ـلـ	لـ	lâm (лям)	l
م	ـم	ـمـ	مـ	mim (мим)	m
ن	ـن	ـنـ	نـ	nun (нун)	n
ۋ	ـۋ	—		üç noqtalı vav (учь нокъталы вав)	v ^{4}
و	ـو	—		vav (вав)	o, ö ^{4}
ۇ	ـۇ	—		virgülli vav (виргюлли вав)	u, ü ^{4}
ﻩ	ـه	ـهـ ـه‌	هـ	he (хе)	-, e, a ^{5}
ﻻ	ﻼ	—		lâm-elif (лям-елиф)	la, lâ ^{6}
ی	ـی	ـیـ	یـ	ye (йе)	y, ı, i

1. In initial position, when the letter ع (ayn) is used, the vowel letter is usually dropped. Examples include عسكه‌ر (asker), عبره‌ت (ibret), عثمان (osman), عمه‌ر (ömer).
  - The exception to this rule is that it can be followed by a vowel letter, in matching with the original Arabic writing of a word. عایشه (Ayşe), عالیم (Alim)
2. The letter ﻙ (kef) was often used in place of ﮒ and ﯓ.
3. The letter is actually ﮒ, some words with ﮒ are also readed as "y", to simplified this was the character by some writers used.
4. The divergence of the three variants of the letter vav is one of the implemented conventions in the early 1920s into Crimean Tatar Arabic alphabet.
5. Used as an h sound, and as a e sound (at the end of words). With the above mentioned modifications, the role of this letter expanded notably, in that the "final form ـه ه came to be used for the vowel sound e in the middle of the word in a lot more cases.
6. Not an actual letter, but a common ligature.
7. Letters shown with beige background are only used for writing of loanwords from Arabic language. They do not represent unique Crimean Tatar sounds, but sounds that are also written with other letters. Therefore, one of the implemented conventions in the early 1920s into Crimean Tatar Arabic alphabet was the acceptance (but not full enforcement, remaining optional) the removal of such letters.
  - All loandwords written with either ث (se), س (sin), or ص (sad) were to be written using س (sin).
  - All loandwords written with either ذ (zal), ز (ze), ض (zad), or ظ (za) were to be written using ز (ze).
  - All loandwords written with either ث (te) or ط (ta) were to be written using ث (te).
  - The letter ح (ha) in initial position is not pronounced in Crimean Tatar. Thus, the letter is dropped fully in the 1924 conventions.

As per the 1921 and 1924 Crimean Tatar Arabic alphabet orthographic conventions, all vowels were to be written, as shown in the table below.

Modern Latin	Isolated	Final	Medial	Initial
a	ا	ـا	ـا	آ
e	ه	ـه	ـه‌	اِ
o, ö	و	ـو	ـو	او
u, ü	ۇ	ـۇ	ـۇ	اۇ
ı, i	ی	ـی	ـیـ	ایـ

The distinction between front and back vowel sounds "o, u, ı" versus "ö, ü, i" weren't marked. These were derived and understood from context and in following vowel harmony rules. Below general rules are noted in Crimean Tatar, same as other Turkic languages.

- Words that contain the vowel آ ـا (a), contain back vowels, and thus the other vowels in the word will match.
- Words that contain the vowel اِ ـه‌ ه (e), contain front vowels, and thus the other vowels in the word will match.
- Words that contain the consonant sounds ق (q) or غ (ğ), are followed by back vowels, and thus the other vowels in the word will match.
- Words that contain the consonant sounds ك (k) or گ (g), are followed by front vowels, and thus the other vowels in the word will match.
- Various grammatical suffixes that attach a word, also follow vowel harmony rules, which will follow the above-mentioned rules as well.

=== Latin alphabet ===
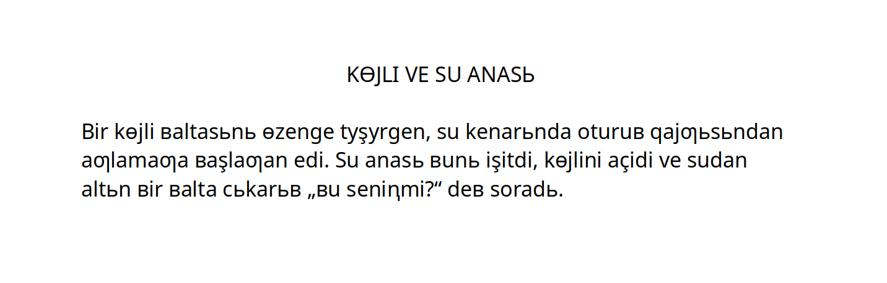
An example of Crimean Tatar Latin alphabet of 1920s. In modern orthography: «KÖYLİ VE SU ANASI: Bir köyli baltasını özenge tüşürgen, su kenarında oturub qayğısından ağlamağa başlağan edi. Su anası bunı işitdi, köylini acidi ve sudan altın bir balta çıkarıb „bu seniñmi?“ deb soradı.» In Cyrillic: «КОЙЛИ ВЕ СУ АНАСЫ: Бир койли балтасыны озенге тюшюрген, су кенарында отуруб къайгъысындан агъламагъа башлагъан эди. Су анасы буны ишитди, койлини аджыды ве судан алтын бир балта чыкъарыб „бу сенинъми?“ деб сорады.»

In 1928, during latinisation in the Soviet Union, the Crimean Tatar Arabic alphabet was replaced by the Latin alphabet based on the Yañalif script. This alphabet contained a number of differences from the modern variant. Particularly, the letters Ь ь, Ƣ ƣ, Ꞑ ꞑ, Ɵ ɵ, X x, Ƶ ƶ, I i instead of the modern Â â, Ğ ğ, I ı, İ i, Ñ ñ, Ö ö, and Ü ü.

Alphabet of 1928	Alphabet of 1992	Alphabet of 1928	Alphabet of 1992	Alphabet of 1928	Alphabet of 1992
A a	A a	Ь ь	I ı	R r	R r
B ʙ	B b	K k	K k	S s	S s
C c	Ç ç	Q q	Q q	Ş ş	Ş ş
Ç ç	C c	Ƣ ƣ	Ğ ğ	T t	T t
D d	D d	L l	L l	U u	U u
E e	E e	M m	M m	Y y	Ü ü
F f	F f	N n	N n	V v	V v
G g	G g	Ꞑ ꞑ	Ñ ñ	X x	H h
H h	H h	O o	O o	Z z	Z z
I i	İ i	Ɵ ɵ	Ö ö	Ƶ ƶ	J j
J j	Y y	P p	P p		

== Modern alphabets ==
=== Cyrillic script ===
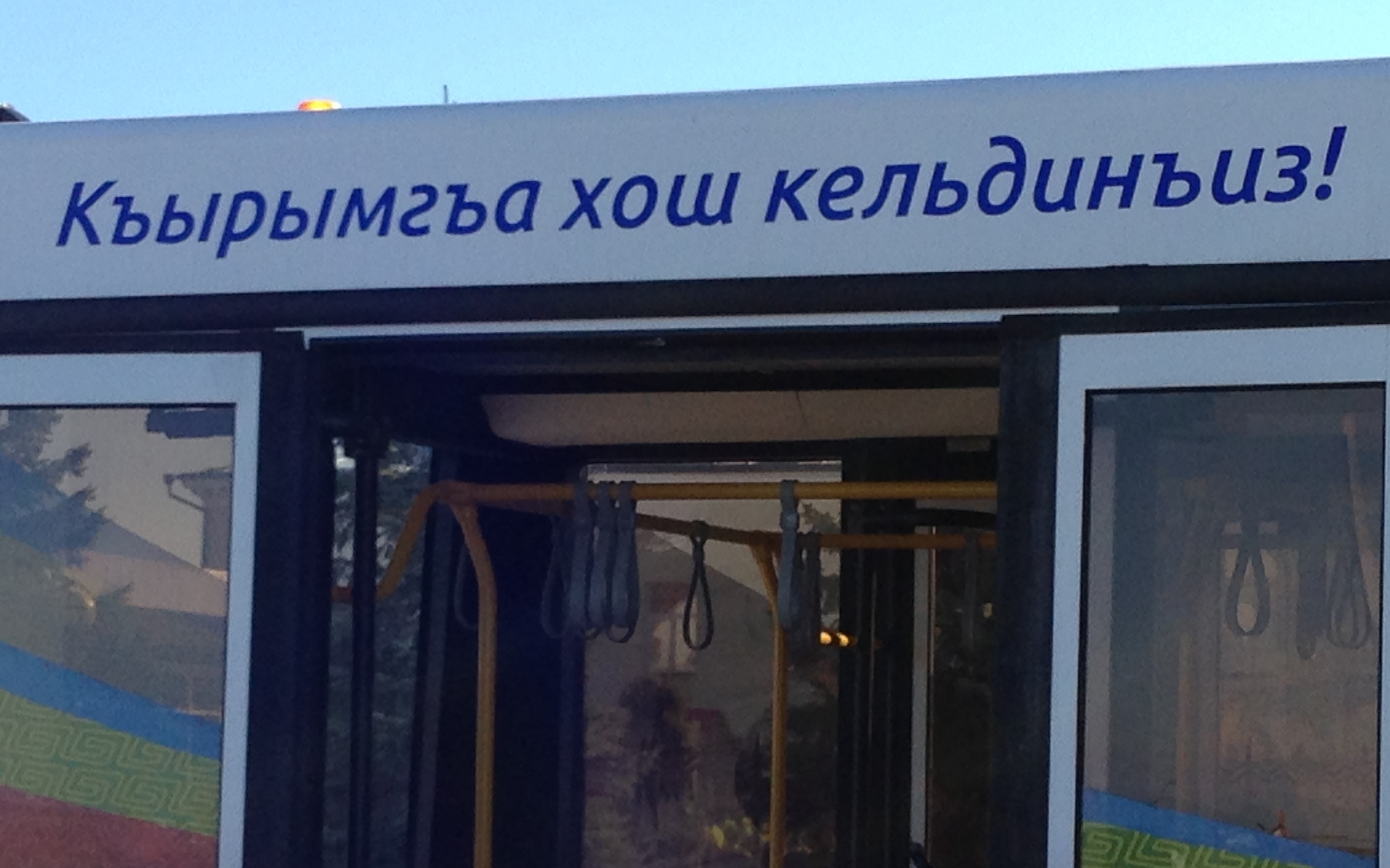
"Welcome to Crimea" (Qırımğa hoş keldiñiz!) written in Crimean Tatar Cyrillic, airport bus, Simferopol International Airport

Cyrillic for Crimean Tatar was introduced in 1938 as part of Cyrillization of languages in Soviet Union. It is based on Russian alphabet with no special letters. From 1938 to 1990s, that was the only alphabet used for Crimean Tatar.

А а	Б б	В в	Г г	Гъ гъ*	Д д	Е е	Ё ё
Ж ж	З з	И и	Й й	К к	Къ къ*	Л л	М м
Н н	Нъ нъ*	О о	П п	Р р	С с	Т т	У у
Ф ф	Х х	Ц ц	Ч ч	Дж дж*	Ш ш	Щ щ	Ъ ъ
Ы ы	Ь ь	Э э	Ю ю	Я я

*Гъ (ğ), къ (q), нъ (ñ) and дж (c) are separate letters of the alphabet (digraphs).

=== Latin script ===
Crimean Tatar Latin alphabet Latın qırımtatar elifbesi
- Script type: Alphabet
- Period: 1990s – present
- Languages: Crimean Tatar

Related scripts
- Parent systems: Egyptian hieroglyphs: Proto-Sinaitic; Phoenician alphabet; Greek alphabet; Latin alphabet; Turkish alphabet; Crimean Tatar Latin alphabet

Unicode
- Unicode range: subset of Latin (U+0000...U+02AF)

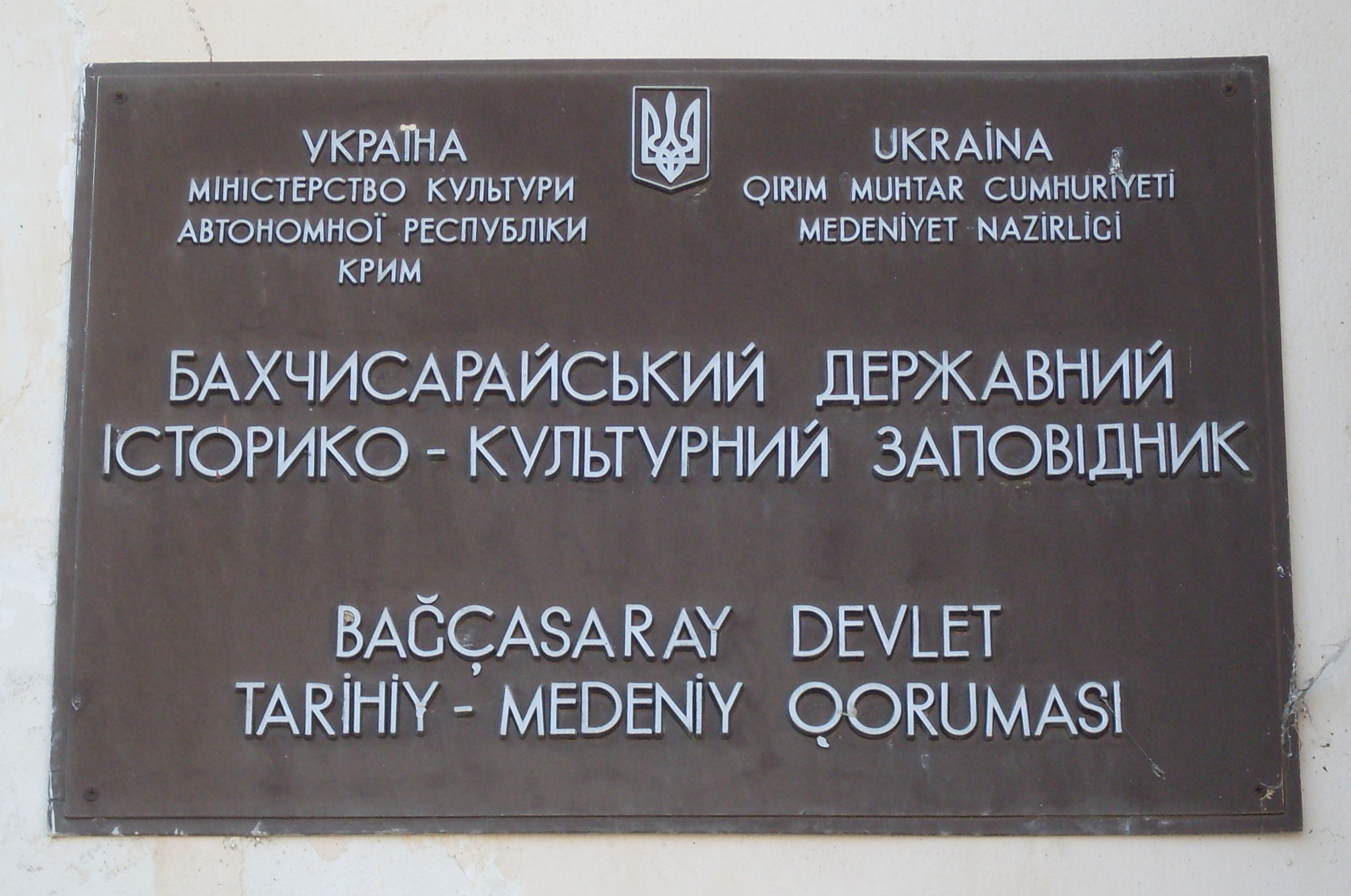
Crimean Tatar Latin script on the table in Bakhchysarai.

Modern Latin alphabet for Crimean Tatar was introduced in 1990s. It is based on Turkish alphabet with three special letters — Q, Ñ, Â. Its official use in Crimea was accepted in 1997 by Crimean Parliament. In 2021 it was approved by the government of Ukraine, to be adopted in education by September 2025.

A a	Â â*	B b	C c	Ç ç	D d	E e	F f
G g	Ğ ğ	H h	I ı	İ i	J j	K k	L l
M m	N n	Ñ ñ	O o	Ö ö	P p	Q q	R r
S s	Ş ş	T t	U u	Ü ü	V v	Y y	Z z

*Ââ is not recognized as separate letter. It is used to show softness of a consonant followed by Aa (Яя).

=== Correspondence table ===
Cyrillic	Latin	Notes
А а	A a	
Б б	B b	
В в	V v	
Г г	G g	
Гъ гъ	Ğ ğ	
Д д	D d	
Е е	E e	following a consonant
Е е	Ye ye	word-initially, following a vowel or ь
Ё ё	Ö ö	following a consonant
Ё ё	Yö yö	word-initially in "soft" words
Ё ё	Yo yo	word-initially in "hard" words; following a vowel, ь or ъ
Ж ж	J j	
З з	Z z	
И и	İ i	
Й й	Y y	
К к	K k	
Къ къ	Q q	
Л л	L l	
М м	M m	
Н н	N n	
Нъ нъ	Ñ ñ	
О о	Ö ö	if о is the first letter in a "soft" word
О о	O o	in other cases
П п	P p	
Р р	R r	
С с	S s	
Т т	T t	
У у	Ü ü	if у is the first letter in a "soft" word
У у	U u	in other cases
Ф ф	F f	
Х х	H h	
Ц ц	Ts ts	
Ч ч	Ç ç	
Дж дж	C c	
Ш ш	Ş ş	
Щ щ	Şç şç	
ъ	—	is not a separate letter in Cyrillic
Ы ы	I ı	
ь	—	no special signs for softness
Э э	E e	
Ю ю	Ü ü	following a consonant
Ю ю	Yü yü	word-initially, following a vowel or ь in "soft" words
Ю ю	Yu yu	word-initially, following a vowel or ь in "hard" words
Я я	Â â	following a consonant
Я я	Ya ya	word-initially, following a vowel or ь

=== Sample text ===
Article 1 of the Universal Declaration of Human Rights:

Cyrillic	Latin	Romanian version	English translation
Бутюн инсанлар сербестлик, менлик ве укъукъларда мусавий олып дюньягъа келелер. Олар акъыл ве видждан саибидирлер ве бири-бирилеринен къардашчасына мунасебетте булунмалыдырлар.	Bütün insanlar serbestlik, menlik ve uquqlarda musaviy olıp dünyağa keleler. Olar aqıl ve vicdan saibidirler ve biri-birilerinen qardaşçasına munasebette bulunmalıdırlar.	Ğúmle insanulî hak, asudelík we hukukta bírdiy tuwgan. Olar zihiniyet we pasiyet iyesí bolîp, bír-bírleríne tuwmalîkşa múnasebette tapîlmalarî kerek.	All human beings are born free and equal in dignity and rights. They are endowed with reason and conscience and should act towards one another in a spirit of brotherhood.
Arabic (Pre-1921)	Arabic (1924)	Latin (1928)	
بتون انسانلار سربست‌لك، من‌لك و حقوقلردا مساوی اولب دنیاغا کله‌لر. اولار عقل و وجدان صاحب‌درلر و بری-بریلرینن قارداشچاسنا مناسبت‌ده بولونمالی‌درلار.	بۇتۇن اینسانلار سه‌ربه‌ست‌لیك، مه‌نلیك ۋه حۇقۇقلاردا مۇساۋی اولیپ دۇنیاغا که‌له‌له‌ر. اولار عقیل ۋه ۋیجدان صاحیب‌دیرله‌ر ۋه بیری-بیریله‌رینه‌ن قارداشچاسینا مۇناسه‌به‌تته بۇلونمالی‌دیرلار.	Bytyn insanlar serʙestlik, menlik, ve uquqlarda musaviy olьp dynjaƣa keleler. Olar aqьl ve viçdan saiʙidirler ve ʙiri-ʙirilerinen qardaşcasьna munaseʙette ʙulunmalьdьrlar.	

== Romania ==
Crimean Tatar alphabet Kîrîm Tatarşasîñ elifbesí
- Tatarşa written in the Latin script
- Script type: Alphabet
- Period: 1956 – present
- Languages: Crimean Tatar

Related scripts
- Parent systems: Egyptian hieroglyphs: Proto-Sinaitic; Phoenician alphabet; Greek alphabet; Latin alphabet; Crimean Tatar alphabet

Unicode
- Unicode range: subset of Latin (U+0000...U+024F)

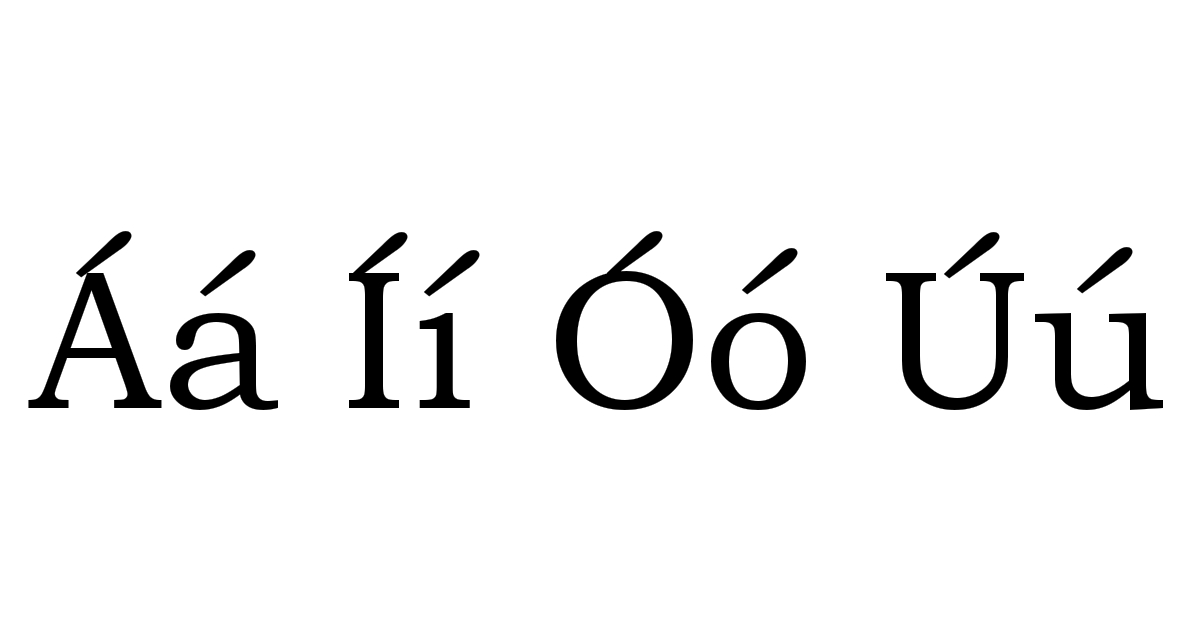
Letter appearance (font) of Á á, Í í, Ó ó, Ú ú unique to Crimean Tatar in Romania

=== Literary Tatar ===
Tatar spoken in Romania has two distinct facets existing, interweaving and forming together the literary Tatar language "edebiy Tatarğa". One of these aspects is the authentic Tatar called "ğalpî Tatarğa" or "ğalpak Tatarğa" and the other is the academic Tatar language called "muwallímatça".

- Academic Tatar language, means writing and pronouncing Arabic and Persian neologisms - occurring mostly in science, religion, literature, arts or politics - in their original form.
- Authentic Tatar language, means writing and pronouncing words, including those of Arabic and Persian origin, by strictly adapting them to the own phonetic system.

=== Naturalization ===
Naturalization is shifting the spelling of academic speech sounds to authentic sounds following the patterns below, where a greater-than sign indicates that one sound changes to another.

f > p
v > w
v > b
ç > ş
ç > j
h > (skip over)
h > k
h > y
h > w

=== Letters ===
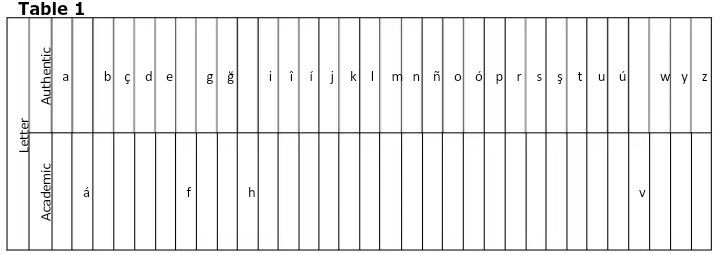
Letters of Dobrujan Tatar alphabet

There is a total of 10 letters used to represent determinant sounds of which 9 mark authentic determinant sounds: a, e, i, î, í, o, ó, u, ú while the letter á is used for an academic vowel. The writing system registers authentic consonants with 17 letters: b, ç, d, g, ğ, j, k, l, m, n, ñ, p, r, s, ş, t, z and has three signs standing for the academic consonants: f, h, v. There are also two authentic semivowels: y, w. An old authentic Turkic consonant, the sound /ç/ represented by the letter ⟨Ç⟩ is rarely heard because authentic speakers of Tatar spoken in Dobruja spell it /ş/ as letter ⟨Ş⟩. As the written language most often follows the spoken language shifting ⟨Ç⟩ to ⟨Ş⟩, the result is that in Tatar spoken in Romania letter ⟨Ç⟩ and sound /ç/ are often treated as academic.

The letters b, d, g, ğ, i, ó, u, ú, v can't occur at the end, as a last letter of the word (exception: ald and dad). Also the letter ñ can't occur as an initial letter of a word.

=== Letter groups "aá" and "áa" ===
The group of letters aá does not symbolize two adjacent vowels, being a writing convention that shows that the reading is done according to the first vowel in the group and the inflection of the word is done according to the second vowel in the group. For example, the reading of the word kaár "care" is identical to that of kar "snow", but in the ablative case they will become kaárden "of/from care", respectively kardan "of/from snow". The group of letters áa must be treated similarly. For example, the word nikáa "wedding" is read as "niká" and its dative will be nikáaga "to/to the wedding".

=== Pronunciation ===
Latin character	Name	Sound description and pronunciation
A a	A	This letter represents the low unrounded RTR or hard vowel /ɑ/ as in ana [ɑṉɑ] 'mother'.
Á á	Hemzelí A	This letter occurring in a limited number of Arabic and Persian loanwords represents the near-low unrounded ATR or soft vowel not belonging to authentic Tatar language /æ/ as in sáát [s̶ææt̶] 'hour', 'clock'.
B b	Be	This letter represents two distinctive consonantal sounds: the hard voiced bilabial stop /ḇ/ as in bal [ḇaḻ] 'honey' and the soft voiced bilabial stop /b̶/ as in bel [b̶el̶] 'waist'.
Ç ç	Çe	This letter represents two distinctive consonantal sounds: the hard voiceless palato-alveolar affricate /ṯ͡ʃ̱/ as in ça-ça [ṯ͡ʃ̱ɑṯ͡ʃ̱ɑ] 'cha-cha' and the soft voiceless palato-alveolar affricate /t̶͡ʃ̶/ as in çeçen [t̶͡ʃ̶et̶͡ʃ̶en̶] 'chechen'. Common to Turkic languages, these sounds are quasi non-existent in Tatar spoken in Dobruja where they have shifted from «Ç» to «Ş». Therefore, although authentic, these sounds could be equally treated as academic.
D d	De	This letter represents two distinctive consonantal sounds: hard voiced dental stop /ḏ/ as in dal [ḏɑḻ] 'branch' and the soft voiced dental stop/d̶/ as in deren [d̶er̶en̶] 'deep'.
E e	E	This letter represents the mid unrounded ATR or soft vowel /e/ as in sen [s̶en̶] 'you'.
F f	Fe	This letter occurs only in loanwords for it represents sounds that do not belong to authentic Tatar language. In authentic reading the foreign sound is naturalized and the letter reads as letter «P». In academic reading it represents two distinctive consonantal sounds: the hard voiceless labio-dental fricative [f̱] as in fal [f̱ɑḻ] 'destiny' and the soft voiceless labio-dental fricative [f̶] as in fen [f̶en̶] 'technics'.
G g	Ge	This letter represents the soft voiced palatal stop [ɟ̱] as in gene [ɟ̱en̶e] 'again', 'still' with its allophone the soft voiced velar stop /g/ as in gúl [gu̶l̶] 'flower', 'rose'. It also represents the hard voiced uvular fricative /ʁ/ as in gam [ʁɑm] 'grief'.
Ğ ğ	Ğe	The letter represents two distinctive consonantal sounds: the hard voiced palato-alveolar affricate/ḏ͡ʒ̱/ as in ğar [ḏ͡ʒ̱ɑṟ] 'abyss' and the soft voiced palato-alveolar affricate/d̶͡ʒ̶/ as in ğer [d̶͡ʒ̶er̶] 'place', 'ground'.
H h	He	Representing sounds that do not belong to authentic Tatar language this letter occurs only in loanwords. Most often, in authentic reading, when it reproduces the Arabic or Persian ه‍ it is a silent letter or, if it is located at the beginning or end of the word, the sound is usually naturalized and the letter reads as letter «K». When it reproduces ح or خ the sound is usually naturalized as /q/. In academic reading it represents two distinctive consonantal sounds: the hard voiceless glottal fricative /h/ as in taht [ṯɑhṯ] 'throne' and the soft voiceless uvular fricative /χ/ as in heşt [χeʃ̶t̶] 'eight'.
I i	I	The letter represents the hight unrounded ATR or soft vowel /i/ as in biñ [b̶iŋ] 'thousand'.
Í í	Hemzelí I, Kîska I, Zayîf I	This letter represents the hight unrounded half-advanced ATR or soft vowel /ɨ/ as in bír [b̶ɨr̶] 'one' is specific to Tatar. At the end of the word it is pronounced with half open mouth undergoing dilatation "Keñiytúw" and becoming mid unrounded half-advanced ATR or soft /ə/, also known as schwa, as in tílí [t̶ɨl̶ə] 'his tongue'.
Î î	Kalpaklî I, Tartuwlî I	This letter represents the hight unrounded RTR or hard vowel /ɯ/ as in îşan [ɯʃ̱ɑṉ] 'mouse'. At the end of the word it is pronounced with half open mouth shifting through dilatation "Keñiytúw" to mid unrounded RTR or hard /ɤ/, close to schwa, as in şîlapşî [ʃ̱ɯḻɑp̱ʃ̱ɤ] 'trough'.
J j	Je	This letter represents two distinctive consonantal sounds: the hard voiced palato-alveolar affricate /ʒ̱/ as in taj [ṯɑʒ̱] 'crown' and the soft voiced palato-alveolar affricate /ʒ̶/ as in bej [b̶eʒ̶] 'beige'.
K k	Ke	This letter represents the soft voiceless palatal stop /c/ as in kel [cel̶] 'come!' and its allophone the soft voiceless velar stop /k/ as in kól [kɵl̶] 'lake'. It also represents the hard voiceless uvular stop /q/ as in kal [qɑḻ] 'stay!'.
L l	Le	This letter represents two distinctive consonantal sounds: the hard alveolar lateral approximant /ḻ/ as in bal [ḇɑḻ] 'honey' and the soft alveolar lateral approximant /l̶/ as in bel [b̶el̶] 'waist'.
M m	Me	This letter represents two distinctive consonantal sounds: the hard bilabial nasal /m̱/ as in maga [m̱ɑʁɑ] 'to me' and the soft bilabial nasal /m̶/ as in men [m̶en̶] 'I'.
N n	Ne	This letter represents two distinctive consonantal sounds: the hard dental nasal /ṉ/ as in ana [ɑṉɑ] 'mother' and the soft dental nasal /n̶/ as in ne [n̶e] 'what'.
Ñ ñ	Eñ, Dalgalî Ne	This letter represents two distinctive consonantal sounds: the hard uvular nasal /ɴ/ as in añ [ɑɴ] 'conscience' and the soft velar nasal /ŋ/ as in eñ [eŋ] 'most'.
O o	O	This letter represents the mid rounded RTR or hard vowel /o/ as in bo [ḇo] 'this'.
Ó ó	Noktalî O	This letter represents the mid rounded half-advanced ATR or soft vowel /ɵ/ as in tór [t̶ɵr̶] 'background'.
P p	Pe	This letter represents two distinctive consonantal sounds: the hard voiceless bilabial stap /p̱/ as in ğap [ḏ͡ʒ̱ɑp̱] 'close!' and the soft voiceless bilabial stop /p̶/ as in ğep [d̶͡ʒ̶ep̶] 'pocket'.
R r	Re	This letter represents two distinctive consonantal sounds: the hard alveolar trill /ṟ/ as in tar [ṯɑṟ] 'narrow' and the soft alveolar trill /r̶/ as in ter [t̶er̶] 'sweat'.
S s	Se	This letter represents two distinctive consonantal sounds: the hard voiceless alveolar fricative /s̱/ as in sal [s̱ɑḻ] 'raft' and the soft voiceless alveolar fricative /s̶/ as in sel [s̶el̶] 'flood'.
Ş ş	Şe	This letter represents two distinctive consonantal sounds: the hard voiceless palato-alveolar fricative /ʃ̱/ as in şaş [ʃ̱ɑʃ̱] 'spread!' and the soft voiceless palato-alveolar fricative /ʃ̶/ as in şeş [ʃ̶eʃ̶] 'untie'.
T t	Te	This letter represents two distinctive consonantal sounds: the hard voiceless dental stop /ṯ/ as in tar [ṯɑṟ] 'tight', 'narrow' and the soft voiceless dental stop /t̶/ as in ter [t̶er̶] 'sweat'.
U u	U	This letter represents the hight rounded RTR or hard vowel /u/ as in un [uṉ] 'flour'.
Ú ú	Noktalî U	This letter represents the hight rounded half-advanced ATR or soft vowel /ʉ/ as in sút [s̶ʉt̶] 'milk'. In the vicinity of semivowel y, which occurs rarely, its articulation shifts to high rounded ATR or soft /y/, close to Turkish pronunciation, as in súymek [s̶ym̶ec] 'to love'.
V v	Ve	This letter occurs only in loanwords for it represents sounds that do not belong to authentic Tatar spoken in Romania. In authentic reading the foreign sound is naturalized and the letter reads sometimes as «W», sometimes as «B». In academic it represents two distinctive consonantal sounds: the hard voiced labio-dental fricative /v̱/ as in vals [v̱ɑḻs̱] 'waltz' and the soft voiced labio-dental fricative /v̶/ as in ve [v̶e] 'and'.
W w	We	This letter represents two distinctive consonantal sounds: the hard labio-velar semivowel /w̱/ as in taw [ṯɑw̱] 'forest', 'mountain' and the soft labio-velar semivowel /w̶/ as in tew [t̶ew̶] 'central', 'fundamental'.
Y y	Ye	This letter represents two distinctive consonantal sounds: the hard palatal semivowel /j̠/ as in tay [ṯɑj̠] 'foal' and the soft palatal semivowel /j̶/ as in yer [j̶er̶] 'place', 'ground'.
Z z	Ze	This letter represents two distinctive consonantal sounds: the hard voiced alveolar fricative /ẕ/ as in taz [ṯɑẕ] 'bald' and the soft voiced alveolar fricative /z̶/ as in tez [t̶ez̶] 'quick'.

=== History ===
In 1956 were the discussions about the alphabet problems of Dobrujan Tatar, which was regulated by Vladimir Drîmba, a well-known Turkologist, including other professors and teachers. The result was 33 letters, 10 of them vowels and 23 consonants. It was used in University of Bucharest, the Faculty of Foreign Languages and Literatures. The letter "Ç ç" is to see as "Č č" in the document of alphabet discussions, also "Ğ ğ" is more like "Ǧ ǧ". But they did appear as "Ç ç" and "Ğ ğ" in the grammar books. There was actually also the letter "Ţ ţ" (name: ţe). The letter "Ţ ţ" was originally an academic letter representing the sound voiceless alveolar affricate [ts] and naturalized to authentic as [s] "S s". It is calculated that the letter "Ţ ţ" is fully naturalized to "S s", probably by Şukran Vuap-Mocanu in 1985, this means the words, which needed to be written with "Ţ ţ" are only written in authentic.

=== Arabic script ===
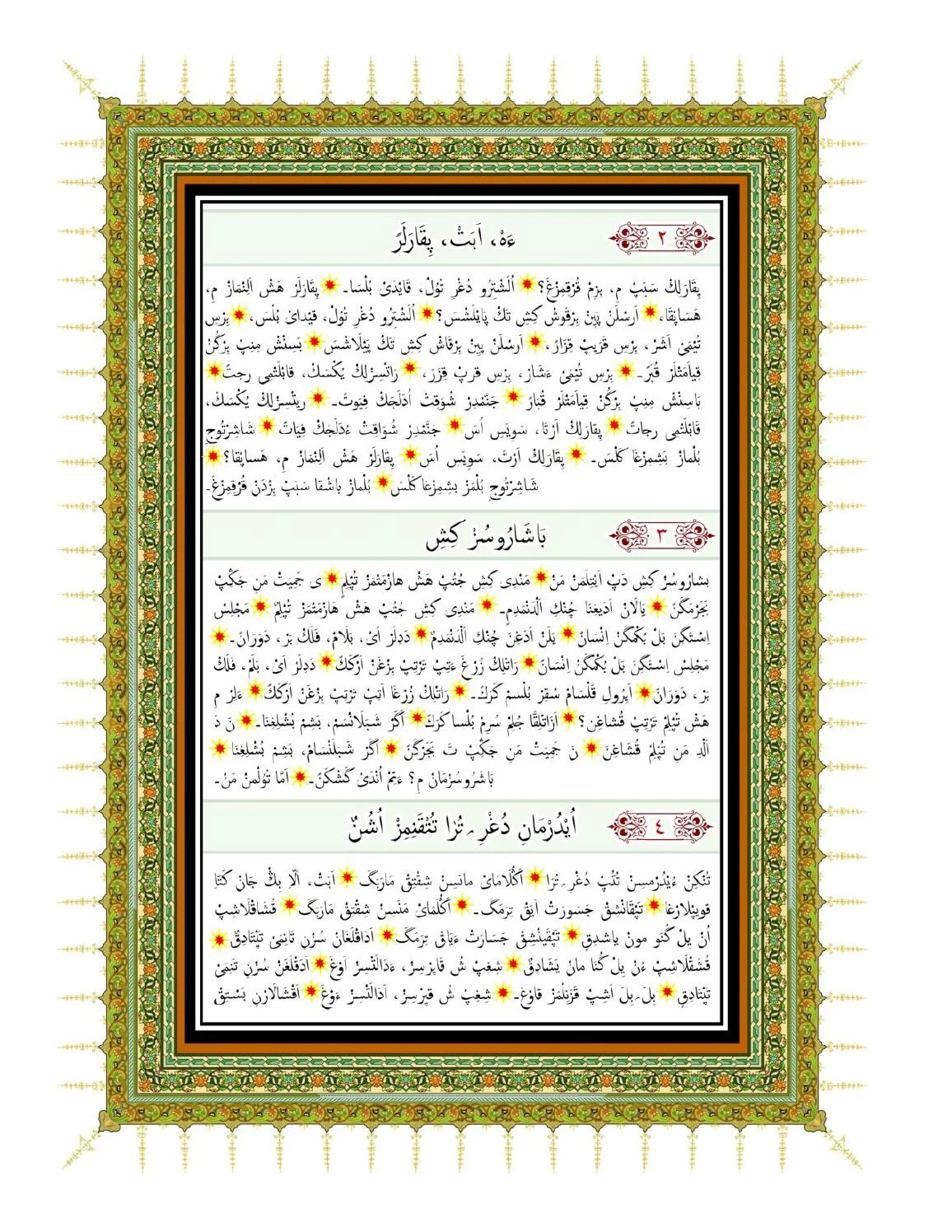
A page from Metrelí kaytarmalar (مَتْرَلِ قَيْتَرْمَالَارً)

Arabic script for Turkic languages was used since the 10th century by Kara Khanids. Dobrujan Tatar did use a variant of Chagatai alphabet. It was the same version as Ottoman Turkish alphabet. The writer Taner Murat, along with some others, revived the Arabic script, he did use it in some translations and did also make transliterations to Arabic script. Taner Murat did write in a different way from the traditional version. He did marked the vowels all the time by Arabic diacritics, like Xiao'erjing and different writing signs were used. Some letters unique to Arabic, were in the works of Taner Murat mostly replaced by other letters. The journal "Nazar Look" (نَظَرْ لُوقٌ), which was founded by Taner Murat, did also have a logo with Arabic script.

==== Letters ====
Isolated	Final	Medial	Initial	Latin
ﺍ	ﺎ	—		-
ﺏ	ﺐ	ﺒ	ﺑ	b
ﭖ	ﭗ	ﭙ	ﭘ	p
ﺕ	ﺖ	ﺘ	ﺗ	t
ﺝ	ﺞ	ﺠ	ﺟ	ğ
ﭺ	ﭻ	ﭽ	ﭼ	ç
ﺩ	ﺪ	—		d
ﺭ	ﺮ	—		r
ﺯ	ﺰ	—		z
ﮊ	ﮋ	—		j
ﺱ	ﺲ	ﺴ	ﺳ	s
ﺵ	ﺶ	ﺸ	ﺷ	ş
ﻍ	ﻎ	ﻐ	ﻏ	g (Note: Only between hard vowels (a, î, o, u).)
ﻑ	ﻒ	ﻔ	ﻓ	f
ﻕ	ﻖ	ﻘ	ﻗ	k
ﻙ	ﻚ	ﻜ	ﻛ	k
ﮒ	ﮓ	ﮕ	ﮔ	g
ﯓ	ﯔ	ﯖ	ﯕ	ñ
ﻝ	ﻞ	ﻠ	ﻟ	l
ﻡ	ﻢ	ﻤ	ﻣ	m
ﻥ	ﻦ	ﻨ	ﻧ	n
ﻭ	ﻮ	—		w, v
ﻩ	ﻪ	ﻬ	ﻫ	h
ى	ﻰ	ﻴ	ﻳ	y
ء	—			-

- Shaddah (ـّ) is used for letter gemination.

==== Letters not used in general writing ====
Isolated	Final	Medial	Initial	Latin
ث	ـث	ـثـ	ثـ	s
ح	ـح	ـحـ	حـ	h, -
خ	ـخ	ـخـ	خـ	k, h, -
ذ	ـذ	—		z
ص	ـص	ـصـ	صـ	s
ض	ـض	ـضـ	ضـ	d, z
ط	ـط	ـطـ	طـ	t
ظ	ـظ	ـظـ	ظـ	z
ع	ـع	ـعـ	عـ	-

==== Vowels ====
The vowels are created with the harakats (ـَ / ـِ / ـُ) also with small-alif (ـٰ / ـٖ), the long vowels are represented by «ـَا / ـِی / ـُو». The long vowels loose there function only when they are fallowed by «ـَ» and are without sukun (ـْ), these‌ (ـَا / ـَى / ـَو) are readed as „a“. The exceptional long vowels (aa, ee, ii) can be made by adding maddah (ـٓ) on the long vowel (ـَآ / ـِیٓ). The letter «ا» or «ء» [randomly] is used as an initial letter when the vowel is the first letter of the word. Also when a vowel is fallowed by a vowel or when «ـِ» is fallowed by shaddah (ـّ), «ا» is written.

Vowels as a first letter of the word

Character	Vowel
اَ / ءَ	a, á, e
اِ / ءِ	i, í, î
اُ / ءُ	o, ó, u, ú

Vowels in middle and end of the word

Character	Vowel
ـَا / ـَى / ـَو / ـٰ	a, á
ـَ	e, a, á
ـِ / ـٖ / ـِا	i, í, î
ـُ	o, ó, u, ú
ـْ	(no vowel)

Long vowels

Character	Long vowel
ـَآ	aa, ee
ـَ / ـَا / ـٰ	aá, áa, áá
ـِىٓ	ii
ـِى	iy
ـُو	uw, úw, oo

==== Tanwin ====
Character	Sound
ـً	an/añ, en/eñ, -
ـٍ	in/iñ, ín/íñ, în/îñ, -
ـٌ	un/uñ, ún/ún, -

- Sometimes is Tanwin mute, when it replaces Sukun, mostly end of the sentence, headline, or single word.

==== Other changes ====
Character	Arabic
!	؞
.	۔
,	،
?	؟
;	؛
"	ۧ
-	؍
()	؍؍
0123456789	٠١٢٣٤٥٦٧٨٩

=== Cyrillic script ===
There is a Cyrillic alphabet designed for Dobrujan Tatar by Taner Murat, including the letters Ә ә, Җ җ, Ң ң, Ө ө, Ў ў, Ү ү, І і. It was also used in translations with transliteration.

Cyrillic	Latin	Notes
А а	A a	
Ә ә	Á á	
Б б	B b	
В в	V v	
Г г	G g	
Д д	D d	
Ж ж	J j	
Җ җ	Ğ ğ	
З з	Z z	
И и	I i	
Й й	Y y	
К к	K k	
Л л	L l	
М м	M m	
Н н	N n	
Ң ң	Ñ ñ	
О о	O o	
Ө ө	Ó ó	
П п	P p	
Р р	R r	
С с	S s	
Т т	T t	
У у	U u	
Ў ў	W w	
Ү ү	Ú ú	
Ф ф	F f	
Х х	H h	
Ц ц	Ts ts	Is used when "t" follows "s".
Ч ч	Ç ç	
Ш ш	Ş ş	
Щ щ	Şç şç	Is used when "ş" follows "ç".
Ы ы	Î î	
І і	Í í	
Э э	E e	
Ю ю	Yu yu, Yú yú	Is used when "y" follows "u" or "ú".
Я я	Ya ya	Is used when "y" follows "a".

=== Old Turkic script ===
Dobrujan Tatar has a version of Old Turkic script, which is designed by Taner Murat. It was also used in translations with transliteration.

==== Vowels ====
Script	Latin
𐰀	a, á, e
𐰃	i, í, î
𐰆	o, u
𐰇	ó, ú

- The vowels are mostly in begin and middle of the word not written.

==== Consonants ====
Script (hard)	Script (soft)	Latin
𐰉	𐰋	b
𐰲	𐰲	ç
𐰑	𐰓	d
𐰯	𐰯	f
𐰍	𐰏	g
𐰖	𐰘	ğ
𐰶	𐰶	h
𐰖	𐰘	j
𐰴 / 𐰶 / 𐰸	𐰚 / 𐰜 / 𐰝	k
𐰞	𐰠	l
𐰢	𐰢	m
𐰣	𐰤	n
𐰭	𐰤	ñ
𐰯	𐰯	p
𐰺	𐰼	r
𐰽	𐰾	s
𐱁	𐱁	ş
𐱃	𐱅	t
𐱈	𐱈	v
𐰔	𐰔	z

==== Semivowels ====
Script (hard)	Script (soft)	Latin
𐰖	𐰘	y
𐱈	𐱈	w

==== Diagraphs ====
Script	Latin
𐰨	nğ
𐰡	lt, ld
𐰦	nt, nd

==== Other changes ====
Symbol	Meaning
:	Word separator
.	Any kind of punctuation
