= Khē =

Khē, or Keheh, is a letter of the Arabic script, used to write /kʰ/ in Sindhi. It is equivalent to ख in Sindhi's Devanagari orthography.

Position in word:	Isolated	Final	Medial	Initial
Glyph form: (Help)	ک	ـک	ـکـ	کـ

In Arabic, it is considered a variant form of kāf, notably al-kāf al-mashkūlah or al-kāf al-mashqūqah, and is used in rasm writing of the Arabic language. It is the predominant form of kāf in the Perso-Arabic script. But in Sindhi, khē and kāf are differentiated: khē (ک) is used consistently for /kʰ/, and kāf (ڪ) for /k/. This is similar to the history of I and J, and of U and V, in the Latin alphabet.

== Character encodings ==
Character information
Preview	ک		ﮐ		ﮑ		ﮏ	
Unicode name	ARABIC LETTER KEHEH		ARABIC LETTER KEHEH INITIAL FORM		ARABIC LETTER KEHEH MEDIAL FORM		ARABIC LETTER KEHEH FINAL FORM	
Encodings	decimal	hex	dec	hex	dec	hex	dec	hex
Unicode	1705	U+06A9	64400	U+FB90	64401	U+FB91	64399	U+FB8F
UTF-8	218 169	DA A9	239 174 144	EF AE 90	239 174 145	EF AE 91	239 174 143	EF AE 8F
Numeric character reference	&#1705;	&#x6A9;	&#64400;	&#xFB90;	&#64401;	&#xFB91;	&#64399;	&#xFB8F;

This glyph may not be rendered or displayed correctly on Apple devices. This is because Apple uses various fonts to render Arabic text. It will also not be rendered for languages displayed as Nasta’liq in the language list in Apple devices.
