= Khowar alphabet =

Alphabets for Khowar Language

Khowar
- Khowar written in the Khowar alphabet in Nastaliq style.
- Script type: Abjad
- Period: Early 20th century - present
- Languages: Khowar, Balti, Burushaski, others

Related scripts
- Parent systems: Proto-Sinaitic: Phoenician; Aramaic; Nabataean; Arabic; Perso-Arabic; Urdu; Khowar

Unicode
- Unicode range: U+0600–U+06FF; U+0750–U+077F

The Khowar alphabet is the right-to-left alphabet used for the Khowar language. It is a modification of the Urdu alphabet, which is itself a derivative of the Persian alphabet and Arabic alphabet and uses the calligraphic Nastaʿlīq script.

== History ==
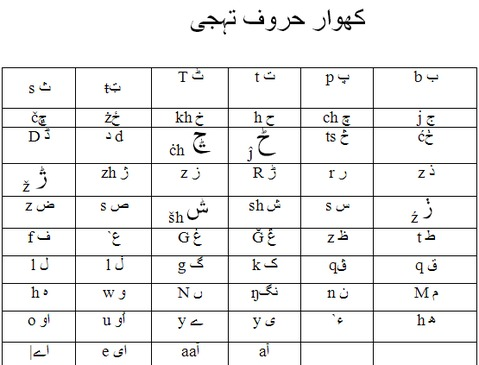
Khowar alphabets

The Khowar language developed during the rule of Mehtar of Chitral State. Since the early twentieth century Khowar has been written in the Khowar alphabet, which is based on the Urdu alphabet and uses the Nasta'liq script. Prior to that, the language was carried on through oral tradition. Today Urdu and English are the official languages and the only major literary usage of Khowar is in both poetry and prose composition. Khowar has also been occasionally written in a version of the Roman script called Roman Khowar since the 1960s. Despite the invention of the Khowar typewriter in 1996, Khowar newsletters and newspapers continued to be published from handwritten scripts by the Khowar authors until the late 1990s. The Monthly Zhang is the first newsletter was the first Khowar newspaper to use Nasta’liq computer-based composition. There are efforts under way to develop more sophisticated and user-friendly Khowar support on computers and the internet. Nowadays, nearly all Khowar newspapers, magazines, journals, and periodicals are composed on computers via various Khowar software programs.

== Nasta'liq ==
The Nasta'liq calligraphic writing style began as a Persian mixture of scripts Naskh and Ta'liq. Nasta'liq is more cursive and flowing than its Naskh counterpart.

== Alphabet ==
A list of the letters of the Khowar alphabet and their pronunciation is given below. Khowar contains many historical spellings from Arabic and Persian, and therefore has many irregularities. The Arabic letters yaa and haa both have two variants in Khowar: one of the yaa variants is used at the ends of words for the sound [i], and one of the haa variants is used to indicate the aspirated and breathy voiced consonants. The retroflex consonants needed to be added as well; this was accomplished by placing a superscript ط (to'e) above the corresponding dental consonants. Several letters which represent distinct consonants in Arabic are conflated in Persian, and this has carried over to Khowar. Some of the original Arabic letters are not used in Khowar. This is the list of the Khowar letters, giving the consonant pronunciation. Many of these letters also represent vowel sounds.

Name	Forms				IPA	Romanization	Unicode	Example	
Khowar Romanization	Isolated	Final	Medial	Initial	IPA	Romanization	Unicode	Khowar Romanization	Meaning
الف alif	ا	ـا			/ɑː/, /ʔ/, silent (Note: At the beginning of a word it can represent another vowel, holding a vowel diacritic that would normally be held by the consonant preceding the vowel, for examble اُردو "Urdu". But the diacritic indicating which vowel is often omitted اردو like other short vowel diacritics.)	ā, –	U+0627	انگار angár	Fire
بے be	ب	ـب	ـبـ	بـ	/b/	b	U+0628	برار braár	Brother
پے pe	پ	ـپ	ـپـ	پـ	/p/	p	U+067E	پلوغ palóγ	Apple
تے te	ت	ـت	ـتـ	تـ	/t̪/	t	U+062A	تت tat	Father
ٹے ṭe	ٹ	ـٹ	ـٹـ	ٹـ	/ʈ/	ṭ	U+0679	ٹپ ṭip	Full
ثے se	ث	ـث	ـثـ	ثـ	/s/	s	U+062B	ثوابی saʋabi	Reward
جيم jim	ج	ـج	ـجـ	جـ	/d͡ʒ/	j	U+062C	جم jam	Good
ݮيم j̣im	ݮ	ـݮ	ـݮـ	ݮـ	/ɖ͡ʐ/	j̣	U+076E	ݮنݮیر j̣anj̣ér	Chain
چے če	چ	ـچ	ـچـ	چـ	/t͡ʃ/	č	U+0686	چومر čúmur	Iron
ݯے c̣e	ݯ	ـݯ	ـݯـ	ݯـ	/ʈ͡ʂ/	c̣	U+076F	ݯار c̣ar	Dry
حے he	ح	ـح	ـحـ	حـ	/h/	h	U+062D	حاجت haját	Need
خے xe	خ	ـخ	ـخـ	خـ	/x/	x	U+062E	خڑاو xaɫáu	Mouse
څے tse	څ	ـڅ	ـڅـ	څـ	/t͡s/	ts	U+0685	څیق tseq	Small
ځے dze	ځ	ـځ	ـځـ	ځـ	/d͡z/	dz	U+0681	ځاہ dzah	Wet
دال dal	د	ـد			/d̪/	d	U+062F	دروݯ droc̣	Grapes
ڈال ḍal	ڈ	ـڈ			/ɖ/	ḍ	U+0688	ڈانگ ḍaáng	Hearth
ذال zal	ذ	ـذ			/z/	z	U+0630	ذخیره zaxira	Dry fruit
رے re	ر	ـر			/r/	r	U+0631	روئے roi	People
ڑے ɫe	ڑ	ـڑ			/lˠ/	ɫ	U+0691	ڑوو ɫow	Fox
زے ze	ز	ـز			/z/	z	U+0632	زوم zom	Mountain
ژے že	ژ	ـژ			/ʒ/	ž	U+0698	ژور žuúr	Daughter
ݱے ẓe	ݱ	ـݱ			/ʐ/	ẓ	U+0771	ݱوت ẓot	Early
سین sin	س	ـس	ـسـ	سـ	/s/	s	U+0633	سوت sot	Seven
شین šin	ش	ـش	ـشـ	شـ	/ʃ/	š	U+0634	شوت šot	Oath
ݰین ṣin	ݰ	ـݰ	ـݰـ	ݰـ	/ʂ/	ṣ	U+0770	ݰابوک ṣaboók	Bride
صواد swad	ص	ـص	ـصـ	صـ	/s/	s	U+0635	صفا safá	Clean
ضواد zwad	ض	ـض	ـضـ	ضـ	/z/	z	U+0636	ضائع zayá	Wasted
طوئے toʼē	ط	ـط	ـطـ	طـ	/t̪/	t	U+0637	طوطی toti	Parrot
ظوئے zoʼē	ظ	ـظ	ـظـ	ظـ	/z/	z	U+0638	ظالم zaálim	Cruel
عین ʻain	ع	ـع	ـعـ	عـ	/ɑː/, /oː/, /eː/, /ʔ/, /ʕ/, silent (Note: Used mainly for Arabic loanwords.)	ʻ	U+0639	عاشق ašéq	Lover
غین γain	غ	ـغ	ـغـ	غـ	/ɣ/	γ	U+063A	غیژی γéži	Alone
فے fe	ف	ـف	ـفـ	فـ	/f/	f	U+0641	فروخ frox	Mouth
قاف qaf	ق	ـق	ـقـ	قـ	/q/	q	U+0642	قاق qáq	Dry
کاف kaf	ک	ـک	ـکـ	کـ	/k/	k	U+06A9	کانو kánu	Blind
گاف gaf	گ	ـگ	ـگـ	گـ	/ɡ/	g	U+06AF	گونج gonj	Storage
لام lam	ل	ـل	ـلـ	لـ	/l/	l	U+0644	لوٹ loṭ	Big
میم mim	م	ـم	ـمـ	مـ	/m/	m	U+0645	مخ mux	Face
نون nun	ن	ـن	ـنـ	نـ	/n/, /ɲ/, /ɳ/, /ŋ/	n	U+0646	نموتی namúti	Barefoot
واؤ waʼo	و	ـو			/ʋ /, /uː/, /ʊ /, /o ː /, /ɔː /	v, w, u, o, au	U+0648	واؤ wau وریݱنو vreẓ̌nú	Old lady Garlic
ہے he	ہ	ـہ	ـہـ	ہـ	/h/, /ɑː/, /eː/	h, a, e	U+06C1 (Note: Similar to Urdu, sometimes choṭī hē is used to refer to hey but choṭī hē can also refer to the Arabic / Persian variant, a stylistic variation representing an equivalent letter, but Persian and Arabic usually use U+0647 whereas Khowar uses U+06C1 for gōl hey. See also: Urdu in Unicode.)	ہوست host	Hand
چھوٹی ہے choṭi he	ہ	ـہ	ـہـ	ہـ	/h/, /ɑː/, /eː/	h, a, e	U+06C1	ہوست host	Hand
دو چشمی ہے do-cashmī hē	ھ	ـھ	ـھـ	ھـ	/ʰ/ (Note: No word begins with this letter. This letter forms part of digraph with other consonants to represent aspirated varieties of those consonants)	-h	U+06BE	پھوست phost	Skin
یے ye	ی	ـی	ـیـ	یـ	/j/, /i/, /e/ (Note: The letter ye can either represent consonant ([j]) or vowel ([i] or [e]). The letter ye can represent [j] in initial, medial, or final position, or it can represent [i] and [e] occur in medial positions, or [i] in final position. To represent [e] in final position, the letter baṛi ye (ے) is used.)	y, i, e	U+06CC	یومون yomún میوه mewá لگینی ligíni	Winter; Fruit; Tongue
بڑی یے baṛi ye	ے	ـے			/e/, /aj/ (Note: The letter baṛi ye only occurs in final position. The letter baṛi ye represents the vowel [e]. To represent [e] in media position, the letter ye (ـیـ) is used.)	ai, e	U+06D2	اوچے očé	And
ہمزہ hamzah	ئ	ـئ	ـئـ	ئـ	/ʔ/ or silent (Note: In Khowar, hamzah is silent in all its forms except for when it is used as hamzah-e-izafat. The main use of hamzah in Khowar is to indicate a vowel cluster.)	ʼ, –, -i, -o, -u	U+0626	نخوئے naxói	Chickpea
ہمزہ hamzah	ؤ	ـؤ			/ʔ/ or silent	ʼ, –, -i, -o, -u	U+0624	بوؤ buú	Owl
ہمزہ hamzah	ء				/ʔ/ or silent	ʼ, –, -i, -o, -u	U+0621		

Footnotes:

=== Vowels ===
Vowels in Khowar are represented by letters that are also considered consonants. Many vowel sounds can be represented by one letter. Confusion can arise, but context is usually enough to figure out the correct sound.

== Vowel chart ==
This is a list of Khowar vowels found in the initial, medial, and final positions.

Romanization	Pronunciation	Final	Medial	Initial
a	/ə/			
ā	/ɑː/			
i	/ɪ/			
ī	/iː/			
u	/ʊ/			
ū	/uː/			
e	/eː/			
ai	/ɛ/			
o	/oː/			
au	/ɔ/			

=== Short vowels ===
Short vowels ("a", "i", "u") are represented by marks above and below a consonant.

Vowel	Name	Transcription	IPA
بَ	zabar	ba	/ə/
بِ	zer	bi	/ɪ/
بُ	pesh	bu	/ʊ/

=== Alif ===
Alif (ا) is the first letter of the Khowar alphabet, and it is used exclusively as a vowel. At the beginning of a word, alif can be used to represent any of the short vowels, e.g. ابدار abdar, اسم ism, اردو Urdu. Also at the beginning, an alif (ا) followed by either wā'o (و) or ye (ی) represents a long vowel sound. However, wā'o (و) or ye (ی) alone at the beginning represents a consonant.

Alif also has a variant, call alif madd (آ). It is used to represent a long "ā" at the beginning of a word, e.g. آپک āpak, آدیمزاد ādmzaad. At the middle or end of a word, long ā is represented simply by alif (ا), e.g. باغ bāgh, آرام ārām.

=== Wā'o ===
Wā'o is used to render the vowels "ū", "o", and "au". It also renders the consonants "w" and 'v', but many people get confused between these two sounds.

=== Ye ===
Ye is divided into two variants: choṭī ye and baṛī ye.

Choṭī ye (ی) is written in all forms exactly as in Persian. It is used for the long vowel "ī" and the consonant "y".

Baṛī ye (ے) is used to render the vowels "e" and "ai" (/eː/ and /æː/ respectively). Baṛī ye is distinguished in writing from choṭī ye only when it comes at the end of a word.

== Use of specific letters ==
=== Retroflex letters ===
Retroflex consonants were not present in the Persian alphabet, and therefore had to be created specifically for Khowar. This was accomplished by placing a superscript ط (to'e) above the corresponding dental consonants.

Letter	Name	IPA
ٹ	ṭe	[ʈ]
ݯ	çe	[ʈ͡ʂ]
ݮ	ǰīm	[ɖ͡ʐ]
ڈ	ḍāl	[ɖ]
ڑ	ɫe	[lˠ]
ݱ	ẓe	[ʐ]
ݰ	ṣin	[ʂ]

=== Affricate Letters ===
Affricate consonants were not present in the Persian alphabet either. Two letters from Pashto alphabet were adopted for Khowar orthography to represent affricate consonants.

Letter	Name	IPA
څ	tse	[t͡s]
ځ	dze	[d͡z]

=== Do chashmī he ===
The letter do chashmī he (ھ) is used in native Hindustānī words, for aspiration and breathy voice. The consonants are sometimes classified as separate letters, although they are digraphs.

Transcription	IPA
پھ	ph	[pʰ]
تھ	th	[t̪ʰ]
ٹھ	ṭh	[ʈʰ]
چھ	čh	[t͡ʃʰ]
ݯھ	c̣h	[ʈ͡ʂʰ]
څھ	tsh	[t͡sʰ]
کھ	kh	[kʰ]
