= Balochi alphabets =

Arabic script for the Balochi language

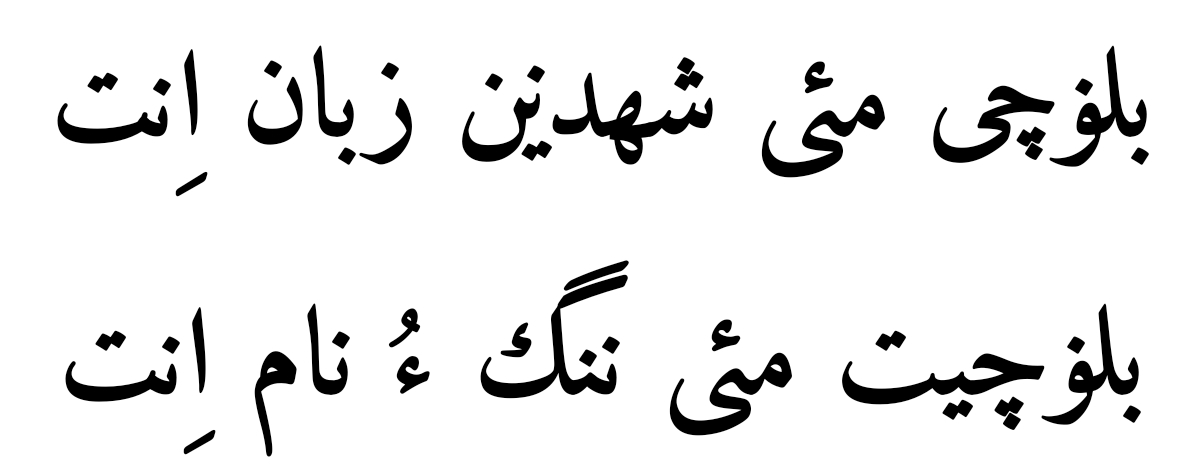
- A writing in Balochi Standard alphabet
- Script type: Abjad
- Languages: Balochi; Bashkardi; Garmsiri

Related scripts
- Parent systems: Egyptian hieroglyphs: Proto-Sinaitic; Phoenician; Aramaic; Nabataean; Arabic; Perso-Arabic; Balochi alphabets

Balochi alphabets (Balochi: بلۏچی سیاھگ; Balòci Siyàhag) consist of the Balòrabi script, based on the Perso-Arabic script, and the Balòtin script, based on the Latin script. Both scripts are used for the Balochi language spoken in the Balochistan region of Pakistan, Afghanistan and Iran.

== Alphabet ==
The Balochi alphabet, standardized by Balochi Academy Sarbaz, consists of 32 letters.

The Romanized version is called Balòtin, and the Arabic version is called Balòrabi.

=== Script Correspondence Table ===
Romanization	Letter				IPA	Romanized Examples	Balorabi Examples
Romanization	Final	Medial	Initial	Isolated	IPA	Romanized Examples	Balorabi Examples
A / a	ءَ/ـہ	َـ	اَ	اَ / ہَ	/a/	Aps (horse), Apserk (cold)	اَرس (Tears), گرَنچ (Node)
À / à	ـا		آ	آ / ا	/ɑ/	Àp (water), Àmàd (ready)	آماد (ready), آسمان (Sky)، آسبار (planet)
B / b	ـب	ـبـ	بـ	ب	/b/	Bàl (wing), Bàsk (arm,member)	بَرۏت (mustachio), رُمب (sheeps group)
C / c	ـچ	ـچـ	چـ	چ	/t͡ʃ/	Coll (channel)	چانٚک (lesion), دو چاپی(Balochi traditional dance)
D / d	ـد		د		/d̪/	Dast (hand)	دیوال (Wall), دراج (tall)
Ď / ď	ـڈ		ڈ		/ɖ/	Ďòk (heavy), Ďèl (donkey), Ďæns (dance)	ڈُنگ (robber(Gedrosian word)), ڈَل (sand)
E / e	ءِ	ـِ	اِ	اِ / ہِ	/e/	Ezm (art), Ezmkàr (artist),Ensàn (Human)	اِشک (Love)
È / è	ـے	ـݔـ	ݔـ	ࢩ/ے	/ɪ/ - /eː/	Èràn (Iran), Janèn (Woman), Bèr (revenge)	اݔدام (Execution), بݔر (revenge), اِسپݔت (White)
G / g	ـگ	ـگـ	گـ	گ	/ɡ/	Guhàr (sister), Gal (happy), Gall (group)	گَنش (Millipede), گُب (cheek), گوارَگ (raining)
H / h	ـہ	ـھـ	ھـ	ھ / ہ	/h/	Hapt (seven), Hodà (god)	ھئیک (Egge), ھال (news), ھَشت (eight)
I/i	ـی	ـیـ	ایـ	ی/ای	/i/	Pir (old), Sir (wedding)	بیر (Thunderstorm), شیر (milk)
J / j	ـج	ـجـ	جـ	ج	/d͡ʒ/	Jost (question), Jàh (place)	جاک (shriek), جَنِک (daughter)
K / k	ـک	ـکـ	کـ	ک	/k/	Kaur (river), Kam (little)	کِرر (side), کَپپَگی (a balochi traditional game)
L / l	ـل	ـلـ	لـ	ل	/l/	Laiť (lamp)	لَھم (soft), لَشکَر (army)
M / m	ـم	ـمـ	مـ	م	/m/	Mam (beer), Mà (we, us), Man (I)	مادَگ (Female gender), مار (Snake)
N / n	ـن	ـنـ	نـ	ن	/n/	Nàl (Balochi promise), Nend (to Seat)	نَمبیگ (sultry), نِھݔپَگ (pregnancy)
O / o	ءُ	ُـ	اُ	اُ/ہُ	/o/	Poll (flower)	اُستُم (people(Gedrosian word)), اُستاز (professor)
Ò / ò	ـۏ	ـۏ	اۏ	ۏ / اۏ	/ʊ/ - /oː/	Òpàr (hope), Òdà (there), Òlàk (vehicle)	اۏلاک (vehicle), اۏشت (stop)
P / p	ـپ	ـپـ	پـ	پ	/p/	Pàd (foot), Pašk (shirt)	پَتتَر (Apologize seat), پِت (father), پُلل (flower)
R / r	ـر		ر		/ɾ/	Rang (color), Ròp (clean), Ròpag (cleaner)	رُنگ (shortcut), راھشۏن (Leader)
S / s	ـس	ـسـ	سـ	س	/s/	Sàng (marriage)	سیاہ (Black), سَنگَت (friend) سُھل (Peace)
Š / š	ـش	ـشـ	شـ	ش	/ʃ/	Šap (night)	شاشک (mosquito), شَش (six), شَھدَربرجاہ (University)
T / t	ـت	ـتـ	تـ	ت	/t̪/	Tors (fear)	تَل (layer), تَلار (rock)
Ť / ť	ـٹ	ـٹـ	ٹـ	ٹ	/ʈ/	Ťulàsk (tower)	ٹاک (Day(Gedrosian wordl)), ٹراشو (category)
U / u	ـوُ		اُو	وُ/اُو	/u/	Nuh (nine)	ھور (nephew)
W / w	ـو		و		/w/	Wàd (salt) Waď (kind)	وئیل (incident), واھَگ (desire)
Y / y	ـی	ـیـ	یـ	ی	/j/	Yak (one)	یَل (brave)
Z / z	ـز		ز		/z/	Zend (live), Zit (soon), Zòr (power)	زَھیر (longing), زِڈڈ (gutty)، زال (Woman(Gedrosian word))
Ž / ž	ـژ		ژ		/ʒ/	Žand (tired)	ژانگ (bell), بوژ (hair(Gedrosian word))

=== Some digraphs in Balochi writing ===
Balochi also has 3 digraphs set by Balochi Academy Sarbaz in Standard Alphabets:

Romanization	Letter of Digraphs				IPA	Romanized Examples
Romanization	Final	Medial	Initial	Isolated	IPA	Romanized Examples
Æ / æ(Ae /ae)	ـئ	ـئـ	ئـ	ئ	/ɛ/	Sæ (three), Æš, Pæl (action), Bænk (Bank)
Ai / ai	ـئی	ـئیـ	ائیـ	ئی	/ɑiː/	Taig (yours), Mai (our), Aid (Eid)
Au / au	ـؤ	ـؤ	اؤ	ؤ	/ɑuː/	Augàn(afghan), Kaur (river)

=== Arabic diacritics in Balochi writing ===
Arabic diacritics are used in Balochi, as with other scripts derived from Arabic:

Marks	Name	Example words	Purpose / effect	Pronouncing
َ◌	zabar	ڈَک، مَ‍‍چ، گ‍‍رَنچ، دَنز	Adding vowel	/a/
ِ◌	zèr	کِ‍‍رّ، سِ‍‍لّ، ھِ‍‍نگ، تِ‍‍چک	Adding vowel	/e/
ُ◌	pèš	پُ‍‍لّ، کُ‍‍رت، کُ‍‍مب	Adding vowel	/o/
ّ◌	šadd	گُ‍‍ٹّ، پُ‍‍لّ، گَ‍‍لّ	Consonant gemination	
ٚ◌	gowanďi	دَنٚ‍‍ز، کَ‍‍مٚ‍‍ب، اَمٚ‍‍ب، سیاھݔ‍‍نٚ	Nasal vowel	/◌̃/

=== Use of Hamza ===
One of the aspects that distinguishes Balochi orthography from other orthographies derived from Perso-Arabic Script is the use of stand-alone Hamza (ء), which, depending on its function within a sentence, is always written with one of three vowel diacritics. Stand-alone Hamza without diacritic is also used similar to other Perso-Arabic Scripts, to indicated glottal stop at end of words

The use of Hamza in such a way was first used in Balochi by poet Husayn Anqa, and officially adopted into Balochi as a result of decisions made in a convention in Karachi, Pakistan on 22 July 1959, attended by prominent Balochi poets and literaturists.

Below are the forms that stand-alone Hamza is used:

Form	Diacritic	Example words	Purpose / effect	Pronouncing
ء	None		Adding glottal stop to end of word	/ʔ/
ءَ	zabar	منءَ اۏشتون (I will stand [obj.]) کلمءَ گُش ایت (the pen will say[obj.])	Accusative, Dative, Oblique	/a/
ءِ	zèr	شپءِ نݔم (Midnight)	Genitive (Possession)	/e/
ءُ	pèš	من ءُ تؤ (I and you)	and	/o/

== Balochi Numbers ==
Number	Balochi	Number Name
0	۰	ھِچ
1	۱	یَک
2	۲	دوٚ
3	۳	سئ
4	۴	چار
5	۵	پَنچ
6	۶	شَش
7	۷	ھَپت
8	۸	ھَشت
9	۹	نُھ

=== Notes ===
Some dialects of Balochi very infrequently use the voiced retroflex flap, meaning ڑ. Due to its immense rarity in Balochi, most orthographies of the language leave out glyphs for the phoneme. When written however, it is usually represented with ر.

This alphabet uses two completely separate and new glyphs to represent the long close front unrounded vowel (/iː/). For the initial and medial forms, ݔ is used. This glyph is based on the initial/medial form of the Perso-Arabic "Ye":
(یـ/ـیـ), the difference being the dot above it. Meanwhile, for the final form, ے is used, which is also based on ی and is called "Bari ye"; it is from Urdu. Sometimes there is خ, meaning /x/.

== Vowels ==
in standard alphabets have 11 vowels,

Balòrabi	Balòtin	IPA
◌َ ـَ اَ	Aa	/a/
آ ـا ئا	Àà	/ɑ/
◌ِ اِ ـِ	Ee	/e/
ݔ‍ ـݔ‍ ـے ے ࢩ	Èè	/ɪ/
ای‍ ـی	Ii	/i/
◌ُ ـُ اُ	Oo	/o/
ۏ ـۏ	Òò	/ʊ/
او ـو	Uu	/u/
ائ ـئ ئ	Ææ - Ae	/ɛ/
ائی ـئی‍ ـئی	AI ai	/ɑiː/
اؤ ـؤ ؤ	AU au	/ɑuː/

== Writing difference between Old Balochi and Standard Balochi ==
In standardized Balochi, letters from old Balochi have been removed and some new letters have been added, The added letters are:

- ݔ‍ Cappi Yà or Arabic yā letter with a dot on it, which is the same at the beginning and middle of the word, and at the end of the word, the letter ے is used only, which existed in old Balochi.
- ۏ Cappi Wà or Wāw letter with a dot added on it

And also in standard Balochi, the letter ڑ is merged with the letter ڈ

In the table below, you can see the difference between old and standard writing:

English	Balòrabi	Ballàtin	Old style
Baloch	بلۏچ	Balòc	بلوچ
Revenge	بݔر	Bèr	بیر
Thunder	بیر	Bir	بیر
Balochistan	بلۏچستان	Balòcestàn	بلوچستان
You	تؤ	Tau	تو
Rain	ھؤر	Haur	ھور
With together	ھۏر	Hòr	ھور
nymph	ھور	Hur	ھور
Attack	بیڈ	Biď	بیڑ

=== "ݔ‍" Letter using ===
Cappi Yà (ݔ‍ ے ࢩ) is one of the standard letters of the Balochi language, which was added to the standard Balochi alphabets by the Balochi Academy Sarbaz. In the old Balochi alphabet, this letter is given as ی‍ْ, but in some others, it is also given as ڃ and یٚ.
