= Taner Murat =

Romanian Crimean Tatar writer

- Born: 8 May 1959 (age 67); Constanța, Romania
- Occupations: Writer, poet, translator, technics
- Known for: Classification of Dobrujan Tatar phonetically, grammatically and linguistically
- Website: Taner Murat

Taner Murat (born 8 May 1959) is a Romanian Tatar writer, poet and translator.

== Biography ==
Taner Murat was born on 8 May 1959 in Constanța, Romania. Until 1985 he studied technics in Sibiu. A while he did work in technical projects. He learned Turkish, and tried to evolve his Tatar knowledge. But he wanted to join the Tatar language section in University of Bucharest, however it was closed. Therefore, he did read the books of the teachers Şukran Vuap-Mocanu, Agiemin Baubec and Mihai Maxim, including the Altaic languages teachers Mustafa Öner, Marcel Erdal, Sir Gerard Clauson, Philippe-Schmerka Blacher and Vladimir Drîmba. Going to the mosque is a pleasure for him. Murat is considered an expert on the Romanian Tatars and their language. He aims to preserve and research the culture and heritage of the Romanian Tatars. Murat has translated the works of dozens of authors into Dobrujan Tatar and Romanian, but also from French, German and English. He is an editor of the bilingual Dobrujan Tatar–Romanian magazine Emel and founder of the English–Tatar magazine Nazar Look (نَظَرْ لُوقٌ) and the Musa Gelil Library of Tatar-related matters. He founded the multicultural organization Anticus and the publisher Anticus Press in Constanța. Murat was one of the organizers of the international conference "Annual Kurultai on the Endangered Cultural Heritage".

== Bibliography ==
- Murat, Taner (2006). Kókten sesler: Temúçin. Victoria BC: Trafford Publishing. Kókten sesler : Temúçin.
- Murat, Taner (2010). Ótken bír șaklayga sewdam: manzúme-iy sewda. Charleston: CreateSpace. Ótken Bír Saklayga Sewdam: Manzúme-Iy Sewda.
- Murat, Taner (2011). Autostrada: poezii. Charleston: CreateSpace. Autostrada.
- Murat, Taner (2011). Fiat Justitia: manzúmeler. Charleston: CreateSpace. Fiat Justitia.
- Murat, Taner (2012). Ağî Ayna, Yeșíl Elmaz: manzúmeler. Charleston: CreateSpace.
- Murat, Taner (2012). Oglinda Amăruie, Diamantul Verde; poeme. Charleston: CreateSpace.
- Murat, Taner (2012). Коктен сеслер: Темючин. Charleston: CreateSpace.
- Murat, Taner (2012). Opening the Doors of Science. Iași: StudIS.
- Murat, Taner (2013). Открывая Двери Знаний. Charleston: CreateSpace. Opening the Doors of Science_Russian.pdf.
- Murat, Taner (2013). اُتْكَنْ بِرْ شَاقْلَیْغَا سَوْدٰامً. Charleston: CreateSpace. Otken bir shakhlaygha sewdam (My Love for a Singing Seagull) by Taner Murat by Anticus Multicultural Association – Issuu.
- Murat, Taner (2012). The Bizarre Age: Anthology of Short Stories. Iași: StudIS. The Bizarre Age – Anthology of Short Stories.
- Murat, Taner (2012). Spectral Lines: Anthology of Contemporary Poetry. Iași: StudIS. Spectral Lines – Anthology of Contemporary Poetry.
- Murat, Taner (2012). Magnetic Resonance Therapy: Anthology of Interviews. Charleston: CreateSpace.
- Murat, Taner (2012). Crossing the Path of Tellers: Short Stories of Our Time. Iași: StudIS.
- Murat, Taner (2012). Extraterrestrial Life: Poetry of Our Time. Iași: StudIS.
- Murat, Taner (2012). The Infinite Facets of Sphere: An Anthology of Essays and Interviews. Iași: StudIS.
- Murat, Taner (2012). Looking Back: Anthology of Short Stories. Iași: StudIS. Looking Back: Anthology of Short Stories.
- Petrovskiy, Valery (2013). Tomcat Tale: Short Story Collection. Iași: StudIS. Tomcat Tale by Valery Petrovskiy by Anticus Multicultural Association – Issuu.
- Musa, Jalil (2014). To a Friend: selected poems. Charleston: CreateSpace. To a friend by Anticus Multicultural Association – Issuu.
- Murat, Taner (2014). پَرُزَلِ سٰلِنْجٰاقْ، قِرِمْ تَتَارْ مٰانْزُمَلَرً جِیِنْتِغِ. Charleston: CreateSpace. Perúzelí salînğak by Anticus Multicultural Association – Issuu.
- Murat, Taner (2009). Dicționar român – tătar crimean / Sózlík kazakșa – kîrîm tatarșa. Constanța: Muntenia. Dicţionar român – tătar crimean, Sózlík kazakşa – kîrîm tatarşa.
- Murat, Taner (2010). Kîrîm Tatarğa Álem-í Tayyarat / Aviarium Scythicum ad scientiam conformatus. Charleston: CreateSpace. Kîrîm Tatarga Álem-í Tayyarat.
- Murat, Taner (2011). Kîrîm Tatarğa Álem-í Nebatat / Herbarium Scythicum ad scientiam conformatus. Charleston: CreateSpace. Kîrîm Tatarğa Álem-í Nebatat – Herbarium Scythicum ad scientiam conformatus.
- Murat, Taner (2011). Dicționar tătar crimean – român / Sózlík kîrîm tatarșa – kazakșa. Charleston: CreateSpace. Dictionar Tatar Crimean – Roman, Kirim Tatarsa – Kazaksa Sozlik.
- Baudelaire, Charles (2011). Les fleurs du mal / Yamanlîgîñ șeșeklerí: saylangan sonetler. Charleston: CreateSpace. Les Fleurs du Mal – Yamanlîgîñ Seseklerí: Sonnets Choisis – Saylangan Sonetler.
- Schiller, Friedrich (2011). An die Freude – Kaside Kunakka. Charleston: CreateSpace. An die Freude – Kaside Kunakka.
- Gaspîralî, Ismail (2012). Kadînlar Ulkasî / Molla Abbas Franseviy. Charleston: CreateSpace. An die Freude – Kaside Kunakka.
- Murat, Taner; Rushan Shamsutdinov (2013). مَتْرَلِ قَایْتَرْمَالَرً. Charleston: CreateSpace. Metreli kaytarmalar (Metric Conversions-Poetry of Our Time) by Anticus Multicultural Association – Issuu.
- Murat, Taner (2014). Perúzelí salînğak: Kîrîm Tatar manzúmeler ğîyîntîgî / Leagănul cu peruzea: zbornic liric tătar crimean. Charleston: CreateSpace. Perúzelí salînğak – Leagănul cu peruzea by Anticus Multicultural Association – Issuu.
- Murat, Taner; Sagida Siraziy (Sirazieva) (2013). Metric Conversions / Metrelí kaytarmalar: búgúngí tízmeler ğîyîntîgî. Iași: StudIS. ISBN 9786066244497. Metric Conversions – Metreli Kaytarmalar: Poetry of Our Time – Bugungi Tizmeler Giyintigi.
- Singh, Ram Krishna; Alsou Shikhova Ildarovna (2014). I Am No Jesus / Men Isa tuwulman. Iași: StudIS. I Am No Jesus by Ram Krishna Singh by Anticus Multicultural Association – Issuu.
