= Hindi–Urdu transliteration =

Ways to convert text between Hindi and Urdu language

Hindustani (also known as Hindi–Urdu; Devanagari: हिन्दी-उर्दू, Nastaliq: ہندی-اردو) is the lingua franca of modern-day northern India and Pakistan (together classically known as Hindustan). Hindi is officially registered in India as a standard written using the Devanagari script, and Urdu is officially registered in Pakistan as a standard written using an extended Perso-Arabic script.

Hindi–Urdu transliteration (or Hindustani transliteration) is the process of converting text written in Devanagari script (used for Hindi) into Perso-Arabic script (used for Urdu), or vice versa. It focuses on representing the shared phonemes between those writing systems or using other writing systems, primarily Latin alphabet, in their stead. Transliteration is theoretically possible because of the common Hindustani phonology underlying Hindi-Urdu. In the present day, the Hindustani language is seen as a unifying language, as initially proposed by Mahatma Gandhi to resolve the Hindi–Urdu controversy.

Technically, a direct one-to-one script mapping or rule-based lossless transliteration of Hindi-Urdu is not possible, primarily because Hindi is written in an abugida script and Urdu is written in an abjad script, and also because of other constraints like multiple similar characters from Perso-Arabic mapping onto a single character in Devanagari. However, there have been dictionary-based mapping attempts which have yielded very high accuracy, providing near-to-perfect transliterations. For literary domains, a mere transliteration between Hindi-Urdu will not suffice as formal Hindi is more inclined towards Sanskrit vocabulary whereas formal Urdu is more inclined towards Persian, Arabic and Turkic vocabulary; hence a system combining transliteration and translation would be necessary for such cases.

In addition to Hindi-Urdu, there have been attempts to design Indo-Pakistani transliteration systems for digraphic languages like Sindhi (written in extended Perso-Arabic in Sindh of Pakistan and in extended-Devanagari by Sindhis in partitioned India), Punjabi (written in Gurmukhi in East Punjab and Shahmukhi in West Punjab), Saraiki (written in extended-Shahmukhi script in Saraikistan and unofficially in Sindhi-Devanagari script in India) and Kashmiri (written in extended Perso-Arabic by Kashmiri Muslims and extended-Devanagari, as well as sometimes in Sharada by Kashmiri Hindus).

== Vowels ==
Hindustani vowels
IPA	ISO 15919	Hindi		Urdu				Approx. English equivalent
IPA	ISO 15919	Independent vowel	Diacritic on consonants	Final		Medial	Initial	Approx. English equivalent
ə	a	अ		ـہ	ـا	ـ◌َـ	اَ	about
aː	ā	आ	ा	ـا			آ	far
ɪ	i	इ	ि	ـی		ـ◌ِـ	اِ	still
iː	ī	ई	ी	ـی		◌ِـیـ	اِیـ	fee
ʊ	u	उ	ु	ـو		ـ◌ُـ	اُ	book
uː	ū	ऊ	ू	◌ُـو			اُو	moon
eː	ē	ए	े	ے		ـیـ	ایـ	hair (Australian English)
ɛː	ai	ऐ	ै	◌َـے		◌َـیـ	اَیـ	fairy
oː	ō	ओ	ो	ـو			او	force
ɔː	au	औ	ौ	◌َـو			اَو	lot (Received Pronunciation)
ʰ	h			ھ				(Aspirated sounds) cake
◌̃	m̐		ँ	ں		ـن٘ـ	ن٘	nasal vowel faun ([ãː, õː], etc.)
◌̃	ṁ		ं	ں		ـن٘ـ	ن٘	jungle

== Consonants ==
Hindustani has a rich set of consonants in its full-alphabet, since it has a mixed-vocabulary (Rekhta) derived from Old Hindi (from Kauravi, Braj Bhasha, Awadhi, etc.), with loanwords from New Persian (from Middle Persian) and Arabic languages, all of which itself are from 3 different language-families respectively: Indo-Aryan, Iranian (collectively from Indo-Iranian, in turn from Indo-European) and Semitic (in turn from Afroasiatic).

The following table provides an approximate one-to-one mapping for Hindi-Urdu consonants, especially for computational purposes (lossless script conversion). Note that this direct script conversion will not yield correct spellings, but rather a readable text for both the readers. Note that Hindi–Urdu transliteration schemes can be used for Punjabi as well, for Gurmukhi (Eastern Punjabi) to Shahmukhi (Western Punjabi) conversion, since Shahmukhi is a superset of the Urdu alphabet (with 2 extra consonants) and the Gurmukhi script can be easily converted to the Devanagari script. Moreover a Fort William College document has shown the equivalent of the 'ع' sound of Hindustani.

Hindustani Consonants
PersoArabic	Latin	Devanagari	Comments
ک	k	क	
کھ	kh	ख	
ق	q	क़	The nuqta, in colloquial settings, is sometimes ignored in Hindi and written as क
خ	x	ख़	The nuqta, in colloquial settings, is sometimes ignored in Hindi and written as ख
گ	g	ग	
غ	ġ	ग़	The nuqta, in colloquial settings, is sometimes ignored in Hindi and written as ग
گھ	gh	घ	
چ	c	च	
چھ	ch	छ	
ج	j	ज	
جھ	jh	झ	
ز	z	ज़	The nuqta, in colloquial settings, is sometimes ignored in Hindi and written as ज
ذ	ẕ	ज़	(Same sound as ज़, spelled differently in Urdu for etymological reasons)
ض	ż	ज़	(Same sound as ज़, spelled differently in Urdu for etymological reasons)
ظ	ẓ	ज़	(Same sound as ज़, spelled differently in Urdu for etymological reasons)
ژ	ź	झ़	Used in direct Persian loan-words; the nuqta, in colloquial settings, is sometimes ignored in Hindi and written as झ
ٹ	ṭ	ट	
ٹھ	ṭh	ठ	
ڈ	ḍ	ड	
ڈھ	ḍh	ढ	
ڑ	ṛ	ड़	Colloquially, ṛ is often an allophone with ḍ and vice versa
ڑھ	ṛh	ढ़	Colloquially, ṛh is often an allophone with ḍh and vice versa
ت	t	त	
تھ	th	थ	
ط	t̤	त	(Same sound as त, spelled differently in Urdu for etymological reasons)
د	d	द	
دھ	dh	ध	
ن	n	न	
پ	p	प	
پھ	ph	फ	
ف	f	फ़	The nuqta, in colloquial settings, is sometimes ignored in Hindi and written as फ
ب	b	ब	
بھ	bh	भ	
م	m	म	
ی	y	य	
ر	r	र	
ل	l	ल	
و	v	व	و is transcribed as /w/ for Arabic words and (sometimes) /v/ for Indo-Iranian and Dravidian words; sometimes silent (see silent vāv for more)
و	w	व़	و is transcribed as /w/ for Arabic words and (sometimes) /v/ for Indo-Iranian and Dravidian words; sometimes silent (see silent vāv for more)
ش	ś	श	
س	s	स	
ص	s̤	स	(Same sound as स, spelled differently in Urdu for etymological reasons)
ث	s̱	स	(Same sound as स, spelled differently in Urdu for etymological reasons)
ہ	h	ह	(Sometimes silent)
ح	ḥ	ह	(Same sound as ह, spelled differently in Urdu for etymological reasons)
ۃ	h̤	ह	(Same sound as ह, spelled differently in Urdu for etymological reasons, sometimes silent)
ھ	h	્ह	ھ is generally only used for aspirated consonants. Any individual usage is generally considered an error and to be taken as ہ
ع	a'	अ़	Sometimes glottal stop, sometimes silent.

=== Sanskrit consonants ===
The following consonants are mostly used in words that are directly borrowed or adapted from Sanskrit.

Perso-Arabic	Latin	Devanagari	Remarks
ن٘	ṅ	ङ	
ݩ	ñ	ञ	ݩ was introduced to write Gojri
ݨ	ṇ	ण	ݨ was introduced to write Shahmukhi
لؕ	ḷ	ळ	Rarely used in Shahmukhi, though useful in Kalasha
ݜ	ṣ	ष	ݜ was introduced to write Shina
ڔّ	r̥	ऋ	

=== Implosive consonants ===
These consonants are mostly found only in languages like Sindhi and Saraiki.

Perso-Arabic	Latin	Devanagari
ڳ	g̤	ॻ
ڄ	j̈	ॼ
ݙ/ڏ	d̤	ॾ
ٻ	ḇ	ॿ

== Numerals ==
Usage	Numeral System	Digits									
International	Hindu-Arabic	0	1	2	3	4	5	6	7	8	9
Hindi	Modern Devanagari	०	१	२	३	४	५	६	७	८	९
Urdu	Eastern Arabic	۰	۱	۲	۳	۴	۵	۶	۷	۸	۹

== Punctuations & Symbols ==
Script	Question Mark	Comma	Semi-colon	Slash	Percent	Period	End of verse
Modern Devanagari	?	,	;	/	%	।	॥
Perso-Arabic	؟	،	؛	؍	٪	۔	۝

== Sample text ==
The following is an excerpt from the Hindustani poem Tarāna-e-Hindi written by Muhammad Iqbal.

Perso-Arabic	Devanagari	Latin	English translation
سَارے جَہَاں سے اَچّھَا، ہِنْدُوسِتَاں ہَمَارَا۔ ہَمْ بُلْبُلیں ہَیں اِسْکِی، یَہْ گُلْسِتَاں ہَمَارَا۔۔	सारे जहाँ से अच्छा, हिन्दुसिताँ हमारा। हम बुलबुलें हैं इसकी, यह गुलसिताँ हमारा॥	sārē jahā̃ sē acchā, hindusitā̃ hamārā. ham bulbulē̃ ha͠i iskī, yah gulsitā̃ hamārā..	Better than the entire world, is our India. We are its nightingales, and it (is) our garden abode.

== See also ==
- Uddin and Begum Hindustani Romanisation
- Hindustani orthography
- Sindhi transliteration
- Hindustan
