= Khebar, Sindh =

Khebar کھیبر
- Town
- Location within Sindh
- Coordinates: 25.677600048733563°N 68.50090830554416°E
- Country: Pakistan
- Province: Sindh
- District: Matiari

Population (2023 Census)
  - Total: 12,937
- Time zone: UTC+05:00 (PKT)

Khyber (Sindhi Bhil: کيبر, Sindhi: کيبر) is a town in Matiari District, Sindh, in Pakistan. The majority of the population is Meghwar Bhil and the Kolis who are all Ismaili Shia, and were previously Hindus.
