= Sindhi transliteration =

Ways to convert text between Arabic and Sindhi language

Sindhi is a language broadly spoken by the people of the historical Sindh region in the Indian subcontinent. Modern Sindhi is written in an extended Perso-Arabic script in Sindh province of Pakistan and (formally) in extended-Devanagari by Sindhis in partitioned India.

Sindhi Transliteration is essential to convert between Arabic and Devanagari so that speakers of both the countries can read the text of each other. In modern day, Sindhi script colloquially just refers to the Perso-Arabic script since majority of Sindhis are from Pakistan. The Sindhi script is not same as the Urdu-Shahmukhi script, hence one cannot use script conversions like Hindi-Urdu Transliteration.

Technically, a direct one-to-one mapping or rule-based script conversion is not possible between Pakistani and Indian Sindhi, majorly since Devanagari is an abugida script and Arabic-Sindhi is an abjad script, and also other constraints like multiple similar characters from Perso-Arabic which map onto a single character in Devanagari. Hence it is preferred to use dictionary-based or machine learning-based transliteration between the Sindhi scripts. For colloquial usage in the digital space where writing Sindhi in Latin script is prevalent, Romanisation of Sindhi is used.

In addition to Sindhi, there have been attempts to design Indo-Pakistani transliteration systems for digraphic languages like Punjabi (written in Gurmukhi in East Punjab and Shahmukhi in West Punjab), Saraiki (written in an extended-Shahmukhi script in Saraikistan and unofficially in Sindhi-Devanagari script in India) and Kashmiri (written in extended Perso-Arabic by Kashmiri Muslims and extended-Devanagari by Kashmiri Hindus).

== Consonants ==
The following table provides an approximate one-to-one mapping for modern Sindhi consonants, especially for computational purposes (lossless script conversion). Note that this direct script conversion will not yield correct spellings, but rather a readable text for both the readers.

Sindhi Consonants
| Sindhi Abjad | Urdu-Shahmukhi | Roman | Devanagari |
|---|---|---|---|
| ڪ | ک | k | क |
| ک | کھ | kh | ख |
| ق | ق | q | क़ |
| خ | خ | k͟h | ख़ |
| گ | گ | g | ग |
| غ | غ | g͟h | ग़ |
| ڳ | ڳ | g̤ | ॻ |
| گھ | گھ | gh | घ |
| چ | چ | c | च |
| ڇ | چھ | ch | छ |
| ج | ج | j | ज |
| جھ | جھ | jh | झ |
| ڄ | ڄ | j̈ | ॼ |
| ز | ز | z | ज़ |
| ذ | ذ | z | ज़ |
| ض | ض | z | ज़ |
| ظ | ظ | z | ज़ |
| ژ | ژ | zh | झ़ |
| ٽ | ٹ | ṭ | ट |
| ٺ | ٹھ | ṭh | ठ |
| ڏ | ݙ | d̤ | ॾ |
| ڊ | ڈ | ḍ | ड |
| ڍ | ڈھ | ḍh | ढ |
| ڙ | ڑ | ṛ | ड़ |
| ڙھ | ڑھ | ṛh | ढ़ |
| ت | ت | t | त |
| ٿ | تھ | th | थ |
| ط | ط | t | त |
| د | د | d | द |
| ڌ | دھ | dh | ध |
| ن | ن | n | न |
| ڻ | ݨ | ṇ | ण |
| ڱ | ن٘ | ṅ | ङ |
| ڃ | ݩ | ñ | ञ |
| پ | پ | p | प |
| ڦ | پھ | ph | फ |
| ف | ف | f | फ़ |
| ب | ب | b | ब |
| ٻ | ٻ | ḇ | ॿ |
| ڀ | بھ | bh | भ |
| م | م | m | म |
| ي | ی | y | य |
| ر | ر | r | र |
| ل | ل | l | ल |
| ݪ | لؕ | ḷ | ळ |
| و | و | v | व |
| ش | ش | sh | श |
| ݜ | سؕ | ṣh | ष |
| س | س | s | स |
| ص | ص | s | स |
| ث | ث | s | स |
| ه | ہ | h | ह |
| ح | ح | h | ह |
| ۃ | ۃ | h | ह |
| ع | ع | ʿ | ʿ |

== Single-letter word ligatures ==
| Sindhi | Urdu | Roman | Devanagari |
|---|---|---|---|
| ۽ | اَیں | a͠i | ऐं |
| ۾ | میں | mẽ | में |

== Numerals ==
| Usage | Numeral System | | | | | | | | | | |
|---|---|---|---|---|---|---|---|---|---|---|---|
| Pakistan | Arabic numerals | ۰ | ۱ | ۲ | ۳ | ۴ | ۵ | ٦ | ۷ | ۸ | ۹ |
| International | Hindu-Arabic | 0 | 1 | 2 | 3 | 4 | 5 | 6 | 7 | 8 | 9 |
| India | Modern Devanagari | ० | १ | २ | ३ | ४ | ५ | ६ | ७ | ८ | ९ |

== Punctuations and symbols ==
| Script | Period | Question Mark | Comma | Semi-colon | Slash | Percent | End of verse |
|---|---|---|---|---|---|---|---|
| Perso-Arabic | ۔ | ؟ | ، | ؛ | ؍ | ٪ | ۝ |
| Modern Devanagari | । | ? | , | ; | / | % | ॥ |
