= جهہ =

Letter of the Sindhi alphabet

جهہ ([d͡ʑʰ]) is the 13th letter of the Sindhi alphabet. It is represented by the two Unicode codepoints U+062C and U+0647.

In the Indus Roman Sindhi romanization, it is represented as "JH".

== Forms ==
It has four forms in total. They are:

Position in word	Isolated	Final	Medial	Initial
Glyph form: (Help)	جهہ	ـجهہ	ـجهہـ	جهہـ

== See also ==
- Sindhi language
