= Kashmiri transliteration =

Representation of the Kashmiri language between different scripts

Kashmiri Transliteration refers to the conversion of the Kashmiri language between different scripts that is used to write the language in the Kashmir region of the Indo subcontinent. The official script to write Kashmiri is extended-Perso-Arabic script in both Jammu-Kashmir and Azad-Kashmir cutting across religious boundaries. Some sections of the Kashmiri Hindu community use an extended-Devanagari script to write the language (previously written using Sharada script). Transliteration is hence essential to cross this script-barrier imposed by religious affiliations and convert texts to cater all the Kashmiri people.

Since both Arabic and Indic scripts of Kashmiri are almost phonetic and preserve all vowels, it is feasible to design approximate rule-based systems that can transliterate between both the writing systems although the former is an impure abjad and the latter is an abugida. Note that one cannot directly use the Hindi-Urdu transliteration systems since there have been various reforms on top of those scripts to accommodate Kashmiri phonology over Hindustani phonology.

In addition to Kashmiri, there have been attempts to provide Indo-Pakistani transliteration systems for digraphic languages like Punjabi (written in Gurmukhi in East Punjab and Shahmukhi in West Punjab), Sindhi (written in extended Perso-Arabic in Sindh and in Devanagari by Sindhis in partitioned India) and Saraiki (written in an extended-Shahmukhi script in Saraikistan and unofficially in Sindhi-Devanagari script in India).
