= Nuqta =

Diacritic mark in Devanagari and some other Indic scripts

़o

Nuqta

The nuqta (Urdu: نقطہ, Hindi: नुक़्ता, romanized: nuqtā; Hindustani pronunciation: [nʊqt̪a(ː)]), sometimes also spelled nukta, (Hindi: नुक्ता, romanized: nuktā, IPA: [nʊkt̪aː]); is a diacritic mark that was introduced in Devanagari and some other Indic scripts to represent sounds not present in the original scripts. (Note: The Hindi-Urdu term nuqta is derived from Classical Persian: نُقْطَه, romanized: nuqta, from Classical Arabic: نُقْطَة, romanized: nuqṭa, lit. 'dot'.) It takes the form of a dot placed below a character. This idea is inspired from the Arabic script; for example, some letters in Urdu share the same basic shape but differ in the placement of dots(s) or nuqta(s) in the Perso-Arabic script: the letter ع ayn, with the addition of a nuqta on top, becomes the letter غ ghayn. The word itself means "dot" in Arabic.

== Use in Devanagari ==
=== Perso-Arabic consonants ===
The term nuqtā (नुक़्ता) is itself an example of the use of the nuqta. Other examples include क़िला (Urdu: قلعہ), qilā, 'fortress'; and आग़ा ख़ान (Urdu: آغا خان), Āġā K͟hān, a combination of a Türko-Mongolic (āġā) and a (k͟hān) honorific.

Nuqta usage in writing Perso-Arabic consonants
Letter	With nuqta	IPA	Example
क, ka	क़, qa	/q/	क़ज़्ज़ाक़, qazzāq, 'Kazakh'
ख, kha	ख़, k͟ha, xa	/x/	ख़ान, k͟hān, 'Khan'
ग, ga	ग़, ġa	/ɣ/	काग़ज़, kāġaz, 'paper'
ज, ja	ज़, za	/z/	अङ्ग्रेज़ी, aṅgrēzī, 'English'
झ, jha	झ़, źa, zha	/ʒ/	अझ़दहा, aźdahā, 'dragon, Azhdaha'
ड, ḍa	ड़, ṛa	/ɽ/	बड़ा, baṛā, 'big'
ढ, ḍha	ढ़, ṛha	/ɽʰ/	पढ़ना, paṛhnā, 'to read'
फ, pha	फ़, fa	/f/	साफ़, sāf, 'clean'

The nuqta, and the phonological distinction it represents, is sometimes ignored in practice; e.g., क़िला qilā being simply spelt as किला kilā. In the text Dialect Accent Features for Establishing Speaker Identity, Manisha Kulshreshtha and Ramkumar Mathur write, "A few sounds, borrowed from the other languages like Persian and Arabic, are written with a dot (bindu or nuqtā). Many people who speak Hindi as a second language, especially those who come from rural backgrounds and do not speak conventional Hindi (also called Khaṛībōlī), or speak in one of its dialects, pronounce these sounds as their nearest equivalents." For example, these rural speakers will assimilate the sound /ɣ/ (Devanagari: ग़; Nastaliq: غ) as ɡ (Devanagari: ग; Nastaliq: گ).

With a renewed Hindi–Urdu language contact, many Urdu writers now publish their works in Devanagari editions. Since the Perso-Arabic orthography is preserved in Nastaʿlīq script Urdu orthography, these writers use the nuqta in Devanagari when transcribing these consonants.

=== Dravidian consonants ===
Devanagari also includes coverage for the Dravidian consonants ऴ, ḻa /ɻ/; ऱ, ṟa /r/ and ऩ, ṉa /n/, modifying ळ, ḷa /ɭ/; र, ra /ɾ/ and न, na /n̪/, respectively. An example is तमिऴ् /t̪amiɻ/ (Tamil: தமிழ்), tamiḻ.

=== Dardic consonants ===
For example, the letters च़ and छ़ are used in Devanagari to write the Kashmiri alveolar affricates ژ /t͡s/ and ژھ /t͡sʰ/, respectively.

=== Eastern Indo-Aryan letters ===
In Maithili, the four non-syllabic vowels /i̯/, /u̯/, /e̯/, /o̯/ are formally written in Devanagari as य़, व़, य़ॆ and व़ॊ, respectively (though these are often colloquially written without nuqta, as य, व, यॆ and वॊ).

The Bengali–Assamese script has ড় ঢ় য়, which are variations of ড ঢ য; however, ব and র are completely different in nature.

=== Old Nepali Letters ===
In Old Nepali language texts, a nuqta-like diacritic is often found on similar glyphs or glyphs that have undergone phonological shifts. There are two use cases found for it:

- The glyph व़ was used to represent the phoneme /w/, while the glyph व was instead used to represent the phoneme /b/.
- The glyph य़ was used to represent the phoneme /j/, while the glyph य was used to represent the phoneme /dz/. Many words that contained the /j/ also shifted in pronunciation to /dz/, following a common trend in Indo-Aryan languages.

== Similar diacritics ==
Sindhi's and Saraiki's implosives are accommodated in Devanagari with a line attached below—a diacritical bar: ॻ [ɠə], ॼ [ʄə], ॾ [ɗə], ॿ [ɓə].

In the Tamil script, the special character ஃ (ஆய்த எழுத்து, āyda eḻuttu) is used like nuqta to represent non-native consonants.

In the Thaana script of Maldives, one or many nuqtas are used to represent non-native Perso-Arabic consonants.

For languages adopting the Thai script, the phintu (i.e., bindu) ◌ฺ (U+0E3A ฺ THAI CHARACTER PHINTHU) (พินทุ, phin-thu) is also used to represent sounds that do not exist in Thai. For example, when writing Kelantan–Pattani Malay, the letter รฺื (ro ruea with phin-thu)) represents the phoneme ɣ (غ/ṛ).

== See also ==
- Hindustani phonology
- Hindi-Urdu transliteration
- Hunterian transliteration
