= Romanisation of Sindhi =

Representation of the Sindhi language using the Latin script

Romanisation of Sindhi is a system for representing the Sindhi language using the Latin script.

In Sindh, Pakistan, the Sindhi language is written in modified Perso-Arabic script and in India it is written in both Perso-Arabic script and Devanagari.

Indus Roman Sindhi Script gives ability to Sindhis and would allow Sindhis all over the world to communicate with each other through one common script. The Sindhi language is traditionally written in a script derived from the Arabic script, with some modifications. Therefore, the transliteration is the process of converting text from one writing system into another, while preserving the original pronunciation. In the case of Sindhi to English transliteration, it involves converting Sindhi words written in the Sindhi script (a variant of the Arabic script) into the Latin alphabet used for writing English.

== Accessibility for Sindhi Speakers living abroad ==
One of the primary reasons for adopting Roman script is to ease communication for Sindhi speakers who know the language but are not familiar with the traditional persio-arabic or Devnagri scripts. This group, especially in India and abroad, could benefit from the use of Roman Sindhi script because they are already familiar with the English alphabet. The shift to Roman Sindhi script would allow them to read and write Sindhi without needing to learn new, unfamiliar scripts.

To use Roman Sindhi script for Sindhi language is not about replacing the traditional Sindhi script but about addressing specific needs in a changing world. By providing an additional script option, it could increase literacy, cultural exchange, and global reach for the Sindhi language, while still preserving its rich heritage in traditional Arabic Sindhi script.

"Indus Roman Sindhi" system is different than Haleem Brohi's Roman Sindhi (Haleem Brohee jee Roman Sindhee). Indus Roman Sindhi is developed by Fayaz Soomro.

== Indus Roman Sindhi ==
Indus Roman Sindhi Sindhi: سنڌو رومن سنڌي لپي is one system for the Romanisation of Sindhi. The Sindhi Alphabet has a rich and diverse set of sounds, and the mentioned below transliteration of the letters of Sindhi alphabet outlines the individual letters and their corresponding sounds.

=== Alphabet chart ===
| Roman Sindhi | Sindhi |
|---|---|
| AA | (آ (اڀو الف |
| A | ا، ع |
| B | ب |
| BB | ٻ |
| C | Use C when needed |
| P | پ |
| BH | ڀ |
| T | ت، ط |
| TH | ٿ |
| TT | ٽ |
| THH | ٺ |
| J | ج |
| JH | جھ |
| JJ | ڄ |
| NJN or NJ | ڃ |
| CH | چ |
| CHH | ڇ، چھ |
| H | ه، ھ، ح |
| KH | خ |
| KHH or KK | ک |
| D | د |
| DH | ڌ |
| DD | ڏ |
| D' or D or ddh | ڊ |
| DHH | ڍ |
| R | ر |
| RR | ڙ |
| S | س، ث، ص |
| SH | ش |
| G' or GHH | غ |
| F | ف |
| PH | ڦ |
| K | ڪ |
| Q | ق |
| G | گ |
| GG | ڳ |
| GH | گھ |
| NGN or NG | ڱ |
| L | ل |
| M | م |
| N | ن |
| NN | ڻ |
| W, V | و |
| X | Use X when needed |
| Y, E, EE, I | ي |
| Z | ض، ذ، ز، ظ |

Above mentioned list or table of transliteration of the Sindhi letters is a guide to the complex Sindhi script, with several letters representing distinct sounds that don't always have direct equivalents in English. It also reflects the wide variety of sounds in Sindhi, including retroflex, aspirated, and nasal sounds.

=== Elongation chart ===
The alphabet of persio-Arabic Sindhi script is highly context sensitive. Many of the letters of Sindhi alphabet share a common base form diacritical marks and diacritical points place either above or below.

| Orthoepi/ Orthoepy | Explanation in persio-Arabic Sindhi script | Explanation in Indus Roman Sindhi Script | Explanation in English |
|---|---|---|---|
| اَ، عَ | سنڌو رومن سنڌيءَ ۾ ”ايَ“ زَبرَ لاءِ ڪتب اچي ٿي، پر ڪن صورتن ۾ ”يو“ پڻ زَبرَ لاءِ ڪتب آڻڻ جي اجازت آهي | Sindhu Roman Sindhi mein "A" zabar laaey katab achay thee, par kin sooratin mein "U" pinn zabar laaey katab aannann ji ijaazat aahay. | In Indus Roman Sindhi, "A" is used as diacritical upper mark "zabar" but in some cases, as an exception allowed to use "U" as diacritical upper mark "Zabar" |
| اِ، عِ | سنڌو رومن سنڌيءَ ۾ ”آءِ“ زِير لاءِ ڪتب اچي تي، پر ڪن صورتن ۾ زير لاءِ ”اِي“ پڻ ڪتب آڻڻ جي اجازت آهي | Sindhu Roman Sindhi mein "i" zer laaey katab achay thee, par kin sooratin mein "E" pinn zer laaey katab aannann ji ijaazat aahay. | In Indus Roman Sindhi, "I" is used as diacritical below mark "Zer" but in some cases, as an exception allowed to use "E" as diacritical below mark "Zer" |
| اُ | سنڌو رومن سنڌيءَ ۾ پيش لاءِ ”يو“ ڪتب اچي ٿي | Sindhu Roman Sindhi mein "U" peshu laaey katab achay thi. | In Indus Roman Sindhi, "U" is used as diacritical upper mark "Peshu" |

From Sindhi to English transliteration, the diacritical marks (زبر, زیر, پشّو) are represented using specific vowels:

"َ" (Zabar) is typically represented by "a" in transliteration. This mark indicates a short "a" sound, like in "bhat" "ڀَت"

In Sindhi transliteration, the diacritical mark "زبر" (Zabar), which typically represents a short "a" sound, is usually transliterated as "A". However, in some cases, as an exception, "U" can be used as the diacritical upper mark "زبر" (Zabar), particularly in words where the pronunciation resembles the "u" sound, similar to the "u" in "put" or "foot."

This is a flexibility in the transliteration system, acknowledging the complex phonetic variations in Sindhi. The choice to use "U" may depend on specific phonetic preferences, but the standard practice is to use "A" for the "زبر" (Zabar) in most cases.

For example:

"پٽ" (Patt) would typically be transliterated as "Patt" based on the "زبر" (Zabar) being the short "a." However, in some words with a more rounded vowel sound, "U" could be used in transliteration: "پُٽ" (Putt) to reflect a more "u"-like sound in pronunciation.

This flexibility helps represent the varying pronunciations in Sindhi while keeping the system more phonetic and accessible to speakers of different dialects or accents.

"ِ" (Zer) is represented by "i" in transliteration. It indicates a short "i" sound, like in "bit" or "sit."

"i" is typically used for the diacritical mark "زیر" (Zer), which represents a short "i" sound (as in "bit" or "sit"). However, as an exception, "e" can sometimes be used to represent the diacritical "زیر" (Zer) in certain cases, especially when the pronunciation of the vowel sound is closer to the short "e" sound (as in "bed" or "let").

This exception acknowledges phonetic variations in Sindhi. In certain words or contexts, using "e" may be more accurate to reflect the pronunciation of the vowel, even though "i" is the standard representation for "زیر" (Zer).

For example:

"بِلا" (Bila) – the "i" in "Bila" would generally be transliterated as "i". However, in some cases where the sound is closer to the "e" sound, you might see "e" used instead: "بِلو" (Belo).

"ُ" (Peshu) is represented by "u" in transliteration. It indicates a short "u" sound, like in "put" or "foot."

The diacritical mark "پيش" (Peshu), which represents the short "u" sound (as in "put" or "foot"), is typically represented by "U" in Latin script.

This diacritical mark "پيش" (Peshu) is used to indicate a "u"-like sound, and "U" is the standard transliteration for this mark.

== Basics ==
- "Alif" (Sindhi: ا), (In Romanized Sindhi: alif is "A"). For example: Ambu/Anbu (Sindhi: انبُ)

"Alif" (Sindhi: ا) is the first letter of Sindhi alphabet and it is a base letter of Sindhi alphabet. Though in Sindhi there are no vowels but the below mentioned letters and compound letters considered almost as vowels in Sindhi language and all of them are formed with the help of alif (Sindhi: ا).

Roman Sindhi Vowels/رومن سنڌي سُر/ सुर

| آ | اَ | اِ | اِي | اُ | اي | اَي | او | اَو |

अ आ इ ई उ ऊ

A aa i ee u oo

اُو اُ اِي اِ آ اَ

ए ऐ ओ औ अं ह

e ai o au a'n h

ھَ اَنّ اَؤ او اَي ئي

| Sindhi Vowels in Roman Sindhi | a | aa | i | ee | u | oo | e | ai | au | a'n |
| Vowels to combine with Consonants | Ma | Maa | Mi | Mee | Mu | Moo | Me | Mai | Mau | Ma'n |

In Indus Roman Sindhi, English alphabet's letter "A" stands for alif (Sindhi: ا), "AA" stants for alif mand aa (Sindhi: آ) and alif zabar (Sindhi: اَ) and ubho alif (vertical alif).

In the process of Sindhi transliteration, the following vowels and diphthongs are commonly used to represent the "سُرَ" (Sur'a) or vowel sounds in Sindhi:

a – Represents the short "a" sound (as in "cat").

aa – Represents the long "a" sound (as in "father").

i – Represents the short "i" sound (as in "bit").

ee – Represents the long "ee" sound (as in "see").

u – Represents the short "u" sound (as in "put").

oo – Represents the long "oo" sound (as in "food").

e – Represents the short "e" sound (as in "bed").

ai – Represents the diphthong "ai" sound (as in "ride").

au – Represents the diphthong "au" sound (as in "how").

a'n – Represents a nasalized "a" sound, often used in words that include a nasalized vowel.

These transliterations reflect the variety of vowel sounds in Sindhi, which can vary in length and quality. By using these specific characters, the transliteration system captures the correct phonetics and vowel sounds of Sindhi when written in the Latin script.

=== Vowel Combinations with "M" (م) ===
Ma, Maa, Mi, Mee, Mu, Moo, Me, Mai, Mau, Ma'n

These combinations demonstrate how vowels (سُرَ) attach to consonants (حَرفِ صحيح) in Sindhi transliteration. Diacritical marks such as "زبر" , (Zer) "زیر" (Zabar), and "پیش" (Peshu) help determine the vowel sounds when transliterating Sindhi into Latin script.

Diphthongs like "ai" and "au" represent complex vowel sounds in Sindhi.

This structure allows accurate representation of Sindhi pronunciation in Latin script.

== Consonants ==
(Sindhi: ب) is the second letter of Sindhi alphabet.

In Indus Roman Sindhi, English alphabet's letter "B" stands for (Sindhi: ب). For example: Badak (Sindhi: بَدَڪ)

The chart shows different sounds of "B" (Sindhi: ب)

| بَو | بو | بَي | بي | بوُ | بُ | بيِ | بِ | با | بَ |
|---|---|---|---|---|---|---|---|---|---|
| BAO | BO | BAE/BAI/ BAY | BE/ BI/ BY | BOO | BU | BI/ BEE | BI/ BE | BAA | BA |

=== Vowel Combinations with "B" (ب) ===
بَو

Transliteration: Bao

Represents a diphthong sound, as in "bounty."

بو

Transliteration: Bo

Represents a long "o" sound, as in "boat."

بَي

Transliteration: Bae / Bai / Bay

Represents a diphthong or short "ae/ai" sound, as in "bait" or "bay."

بي

Transliteration: Be / Bi / By

Represents either a short "e" sound (as in "bed") or a short "i" sound (as in "bit"), depending on the context.

بوُ

Transliteration: Boo

Represents a long "oo" sound, as in "boot."

بُ

Transliteration: Bu

Represents a short "u" sound, as in "put."

بيِ

Transliteration: Bi / Bee

Represents a long "ee" sound, as in "bee."

بِ

Transliteration: Bi / Be

Represents a short "i" sound (as in "bit") or a short "e" sound (as in "bed").

با

Transliteration: Baa

Represents a long "aa" sound, as in "father."

بَ

Transliteration: Ba

Represents a short "a" sound, as in "Bhat" (ڀَت)

Examples in Words:

Badak (بَدَڪ) – Duck Uses "Ba" for the زبر (Zabar) sound.

== Peculiar sounds of Sindhi language ==
There are six peculiar sounds in Sindhi language, four of them known as "Chaar choosinna aawaz" (Sindhi: چار چوسڻا آواز) (sounds made with back of the tongue) and two other peculiar sounds, known as Nasalization Consonant or Nasal sounds or "Noonaasik or Nikwaan (weenjann) aawaz (Phoneme)" (Sindhi: نوناسڪ يا نڪوان ”وينجڻ“ آواز).

- The chart of four peculiar Chaar choosinna aawaz sounds

| ڏ | ڳ | ڄ | ٻ |
|---|---|---|---|
| dd | gg | jj | bb |

- The chart of two peculiar 'Nasal sounds' or "Noonaasik or Nikwaan (weenjann) aawaz" sounds

When you make a speech sound, air usually passes through your oral cavity and comes out of your mouth. But you can also direct the flow of air through your nose, making a nasal sound.

To get the air to come out of your nose, you lower your velum. This opens up your nasal cavity and lets the air out through your nostrils. You can let air out through your nose and mouth at the same time: This makes a nasalized sound.

Nasal consonants are made by closing the mouth at specific places of articulation and opening the velum. The resulting nasal consonants are called stops because the oral cavity is closed, but air still flows out through the nasal cavity.

| ڃ | ڱ |
|---|---|
| njn | ngn |

This Sindhi alphabet's letter (Sindhi: ٻ) is one of four peculiar "chaar choosinna aawaz" sounds and in Indus Roman Sindhi it stands as "BB". For example: Bbakiri (Sindhi: ٻَڪِري)

- The chart shows different sounds of "BB" (Sindhi: ٻ)

| ٻَو | ٻو | ٻي | ٻي | ٻوُ | ٻُ | ٻيِ | ٻِ | ٻا | ٻَ |
|---|---|---|---|---|---|---|---|---|---|
| BBAO | BBO | BBAE/ BBAI/ BBAY | BBE/ BBI/ BBY | BBOO | BBU | BBI/ BBEE | BBI | BBAA | BBA |

=== Multi purpose use of "D" ===
The Roman letter "D" is some times used as Aspirates in Roman Sindhi. For example: d', dd and some times with the combination of letter "H", suppose: dh or ddh to make peculiar sounds of Sindhi language.

| ڏ | ڌ | ڍ | ڊ | د |
|---|---|---|---|---|
| DD | DH | DHH | D' | D |

== "A" is used as "Alif" and as Zabar (diacritical uppar mark) in Roman Sindhi ==
| ث، س، ص | S |
|---|---|
| ثَ، سَ، صَ | SA |
| ثا، سا، صا | SAA |

== The difference between "R" "ر" and "RR" "ڙ" ==
""R"" represents Sindhi letter "ر"

"RR" represents Sindhi letter "ڙ"

"ڙ" = "rr" (representing the retroflex "ṛ" sound in Sindhi, which is distinct from the regular "ر" sound)

== A table that shows the examples of Zabar (diacritical upper mark) in Roman Sindhi ==
زَبرَ Zabar (diacritical uppar mark)
| In modified Sindhi script derived from Arabic alphabet | In Roman Sindhi |
|---|---|
| ھَ، حَ | ha |
| جھَ | jha |
| ڪَ، قَ | ka, ka |
| تَ | ta |
| ٽَ | tta |
| ٺَ | thha |
| رَ | ra |
| ڙَ | rra |
| رََ. ذَ، ضَ، ظَ | za |

| In modified Sindhi script derived Arabic alphabet | In Roman Sindhi |
|---|---|
| آ، عا | aa |
| ڪا، قا | kaa, qaa |
| ڀا | bhaa |
| سا، صا، ثا | saa |
| تا، طا | taa |
| ٽا | ttaa |
| ها، حا | haa |
| گا | gaa |
| زا، ظا، ذا، ضا | zaa |

| اَي، عي | ay |
|---|---|
| اَئو، عَئو | ao, uo |

| In modified Sindhi script derived from Arabic alphabet | In Roman Sindhi |
|---|---|
| بيَ | bay |
| ٻيَ | bbay |
| ڀيَ | bhay |
| تيَ | tay |
| ڇيَ | chhay |
| ڃيَ | njnay |
| ڱيَ | ngnay |
| ڙيَ | rray |
| ڦيَ | phay |

== Romanization of Sindhi words ==
There is a difference between transliteration and Romanisation. The present modified persio-arabic script of Sindhi language is highly context sensitive. Many of the letters of Sindhi alphabet share a common base form diacritical marks and diacritical points place either above or below (Zer, Zabar and peshu). Therefore, through transliteration, the Romanization of Sindhi words is not possible. Therefore, each and every word should be Romanized separately from persio-arabic script into Roman Sindhi script.

=== Haleem Brohi's Roman Sindhi Script ===
Haleem Brohi created his Roman Sindhi and named it "Haleem Brohi's Roman Sindhi." Although there were several minor and major errors in the "Roman Sindhi arranged by him".

Haleem Brohi made a major error in Roman Sindhi by using "TH" for the letter "ذ" or possibly "THD." Additionally, he assigned only "E" and "EE" for the letter "ي." However, "ي" should have also included "آءِ" and "واءِ" as options. There are some words that already end with "ي" and should have "آءِ"/"i" as their spelling. These words have historical significance, and we cannot change their spelling or disregard their historical status, as the World recognizes them by that spelling. Some examples are: Sindh, Sindhi, Bhittai, Karachi.

Haleem Brohi stubbornly stood by his stance and did not agree to use "آءِ"/"i" as an exception for "ي." As a result, under "Haleem Brohi's Roman Sindhi," the words (Sindh, Sindhi, and Karachi) could be transliterated as: Sinth, Sinthee, Karachee Or perhaps they could be written/transliterated as: Sinthd, Sinthdee, Karachee.

Additionally, he left some letters in Roman Sindhi with brackets ( ) as indicators, which made it very difficult to write words or sentences smoothly. These were the reasons, when "Haleem Brohi's Roman Sindhi" was introduced to the public, it did not succeed, and Sindhi people did not consider it a viable script for transliteration. Thus, there were many other significant issues in Haleem Brohi's Roman Sindhi script, which prevented it from fully meeting the needs of the Sindhi language. Therefore, it can be said that Haleem Brohi's arranged Roman Sindhi script was an incomplete script.

== See also ==
- Romanizations of Chinese
- Romanizations of Hindi
- Romanization of Russian
- Romanization of Japanese
- Romanization of Arabic
- Romanization of Hebrew
- Romanization of Greek
- Romanization of Ukrainian
- Romanization of Persian
- Romanization of Bulgarian
- Romanization of Armenian
