= Devanagari numerals =

Symbols used for numbers in Devanagari

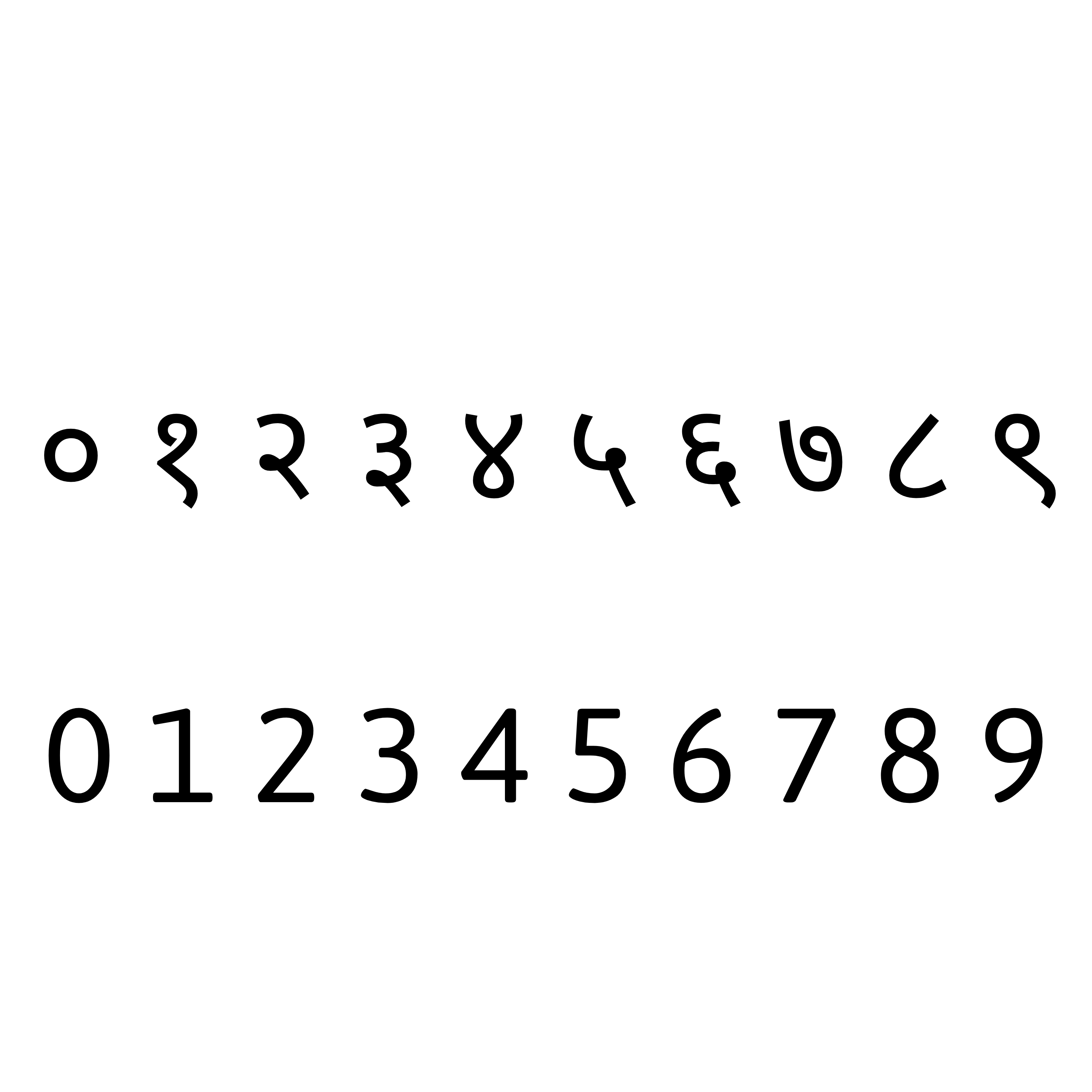
Devanagari numerals with their Western Arabic counterparts

The Devanagari numerals are the symbols used to write numbers in the Devanagari script, predominantly used for northern Indian languages. They are used to write decimal numbers, instead of the Western Arabic numerals.

== Table ==
In modern-era, languages like Hindi, Marathi and Nepali have adopted Devanagari as the standard script, before which they were respectively written using Kaithi, Modi and Newari scripts.

Modern Devanagari	Western Arabic	Words for the cardinal number			
Modern Devanagari	Western Arabic	Sanskrit (wordstem)	Hindi	Marathi	Nepali
०	0	शून्य (śūnya)	शून्य (śūnya)	शून्य (śūnya)	शून्य (śūnya) — colloq.सुन्ना (sunnā)
१	1	एक (eka)	एक (ek)	एक (ek)	एक (ek)
२	2	द्वि (dvi)	दो (do)	दोन (don)	दुई (dui)
३	3	त्रि (tri)	तीन (tīn)	तीन (tīn)	तिन (tīn)
४	4	चतुर् (catur)	चार (cār)	चार (cār)	चार (cār)
५	5	पञ्च (pañca)	पाँच (pāñc)	पाच (pāch)	पाँच (pāñc)
६	6	षष् (ṣaṣ)	छह (chah)	सहा (sahā)	छ (chha)
७	7	सप्त (sapta)	सात (sāt)	सात (sāt)	सात (sāt)
८	8	अष्ट (aṣṭa)	आठ (āṭh)	आठ (āṭh)	आठ (āṭh)
९	9	नव (nava)	नौ (nau)	नऊ (naū)	नौ (nau)

The word śūnya for zero was calqued into Arabic as صفر sifr, meaning 'nothing', which became the term "zero" in many European languages via Medieval Latin zephirum. In Hindustani language, it was borrowed from Arabic (via Persian) as सिफ़र (sifar).

== Variants ==
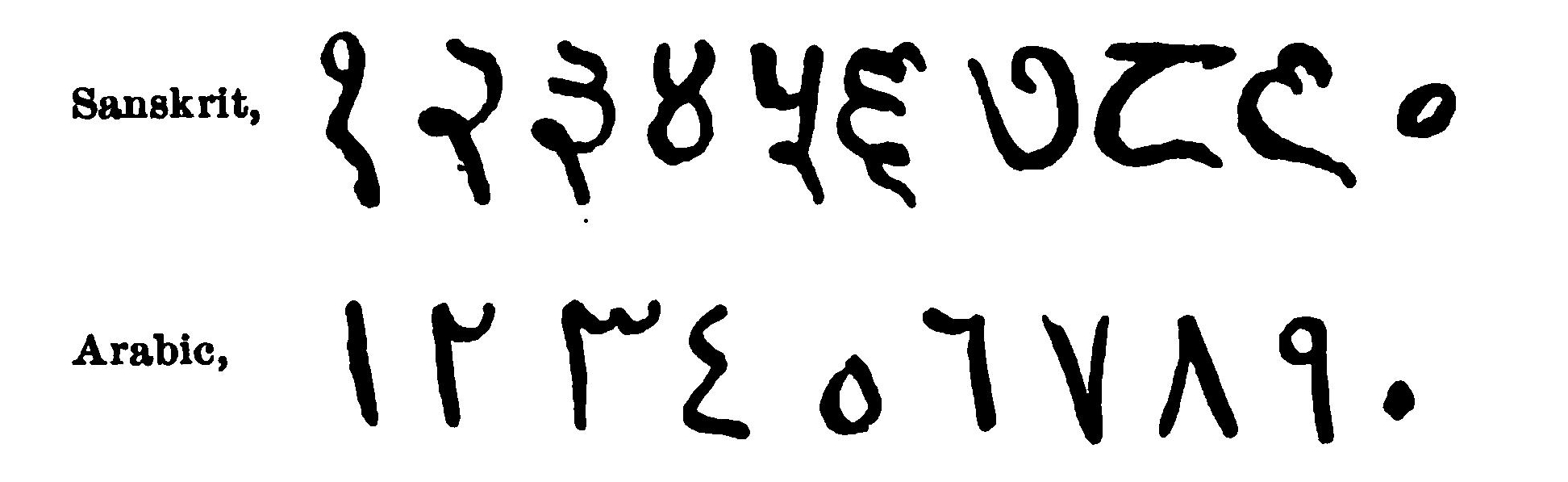
A comparison of Sanskrit and Eastern Arabic numerals

Devanagari digits shapes may vary depending on geographical area or epoch. Some of the variants are also seen in older Sanskrit literature.

१	Common	Nepali	1
५	"Bombay" Variant	"Calcutta" Variant	5
८	"Bombay" Variant	"Calcutta" Variant	8
९	Common	Nepali Variant	9

In Nepali language ५, ८, ९ (5, 8, 9) - these numbers are slightly different from modern Devanagari numbers. The Nepali language uses the old Devanagari system for writing these numbers, like ५, ८, ९

== See also ==
- Indian numbering system
- Numbers in Nepali language
