= Numbers in Nepali language =

Nepali Number System, also known as the Devanagari Number System, is used to represent numbers in Nepali language. It is a positional number system, which means that the value of a digit depends on its position within the number. The Nepali number system uses a script called Devanagari, which is also used for writing the Nepali language.

== Significance of Knowing Nepali Number ==
Knowing Nepali numbers is essential for anyone who wants to communicate in Nepali language. It is especially important for those who live or work in Nepal, as it is the official language of the country. Nepali numbers are also used in various official documents, including bank cheques, passports, and other legal documents.

== Numbers in Nepali Language ==
Nepali numbers
Numeral		Written	IAST	IPA
0	०	शुन्य/सुन्ना	śūnya	[sunːe], [sunːa]
1	१	एक	ek	[ek]
2	२	दुई	duī	[d̪ui̯]
3	३	तीन	tīn	[t̪in]
4	४	चार	char	[t͡sar]
5	५	पाँच	pāṃc	[pãt͡s]
6	६	छ	cha	[t͡sʰʌ]
7	७	सात	sāt	[sat̪]
8	८	आठ	āṭh	[aʈʰ]
9	९	नौ	nau	[nʌu̯]
10	१०	दस	daś	[d̪ʌs]
11	११	एघार	eghāra	[eɡʱaɾʌ]
12	१२	बाह्र	bāhra	[baɾʌ]
13	१३	तेह्र	tehra	[tehra]
14	१४	चौध	chaudha	[chaudha]
15	१५	पन्ध्र	pandhra	[pandhra]
16	१६	सोह्र	sohra	[sohra]
17	१७	सत्र	satra	[satra]
18	१८	अठार	atthahra	[atthahra]
19	१९	उन्नाइस	unnais	[unnais]
20	२०	बीस	bīs	[bis]
21	२१	एक्काइस	ekkāis	[ek̚kai̯s]
22	२२	बाइस	bāis	[bai̯s]
30	३०	तीस	tīs	[tis]
40	४०	चालीस	cālīs	[t͡salis]
100	१००	एक सय	ek saya	[ek s(ʌ)e̞]
1 000	१०००	एक हजार	ek hajār	[ek ɦʌd͡zar]
10 000	१००००	दश हजार	daś hajār	[d̪ʌs ɦʌd͡zar]
100 000	१०००००	एक लाख	ek lākh	[ek lakʰ]
1 000 000	१००००००	दश लाख	daś lākh	[d̪ʌs lakʰ]
10 000 000	१०००००००	एक करोड	ek karoḍ	[ek kʌɾoɽ]
1 000 000 000	१ ०० ०० ०० ०००	एक अर्ब/ एक अरब	ek arba/ ek arab	[ek ʌrbʌ], [ek ʌɾʌb]
100 000 000 000	१ ०० ०० ०० ०० ०००	एक खर्ब/ एक खरब	ek kharba/ ek kharab	[ek kʰʌrbʌ], [ek kʰʌɾʌb]

दश लाख – 10,00,000 (One Million) – Six zeros

करोड – 1,00,00,000 (Ten Million) – Seven zeros

दश करोड – 10,00,00,000 (Hundred Million) – eight zeros

अर्ब – 1,00,00,00,000 (Billion) – nine zeros

दश अर्ब – 10,00,00,00,000 (Ten Billion) – ten zeros

खर्ब – 1,00,00,00,00,000 (Hundred Billion) – eleven zeros

दश खर्ब – 10,00,00,00,00,000 (Trillion) – twelve zeros

नील – 1,00,00,00,00,00,000 (ten trillion) – thirteen zeros

दश नील – 10,00,00,00,00,00,000 (hundred trillion) – fourteen zeros

पद्म – 1,00,00,00,00,00,00,000 (quadrillion) – fifteen zeros

दश पद्म – 10,00,00,00,00,00,00,000 (10 quadrillion) – sixteen zeros

शंख – 1,00,00,00,00,00,00,00,000 (hundred quadrillion) – seventeen zeros

दश शंख – 10,00,00,00,00,00,00,00,000 (quintillion) – eighteen zeros

क्रत्म – 1,00,00,00,00,00,00,00,00,000 (ten quintillion) – nineteen zeros

दश क्रत्म – 10,00,00,00,00,00,00,00,00,000 (hundred quintillion) – twenty zeros
