= Sindhi Bhils =

Pakistani ethnic group

Sindhi Bhil/Bheel
ڀيل
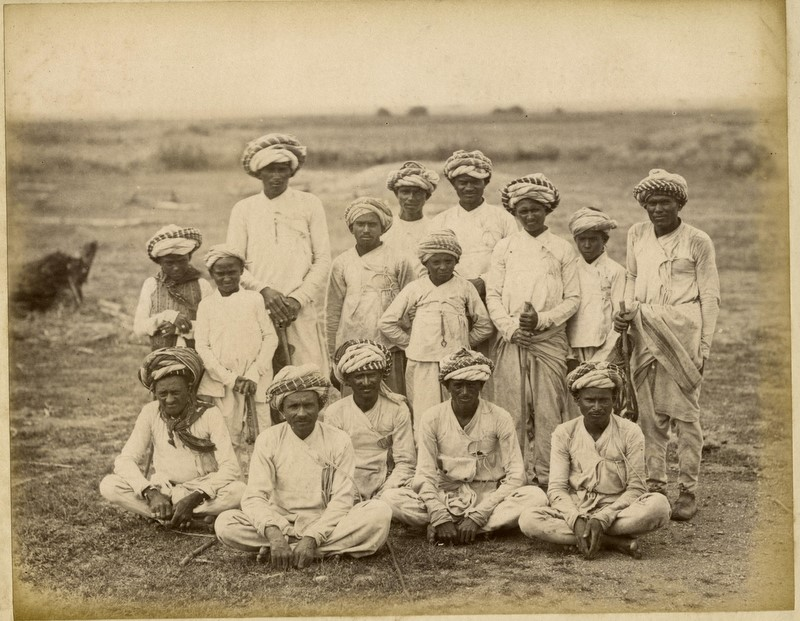
- Bhils of Sindh

Total population
- 17,000,000

Regions with significant populations
- Pakistan: 17,000,000
- India

Languages
- Sindhi Bhili, Dhatki, Marwari, Sindhi, Saraiki

Religion
- Tribe

Related ethnic groups
- Bhil

The Sindhi Bhils/Bheels (Sindhi: سنڌي ڀيل) are a Sindhinised sub-group of the Bhil people who live in the Sindh, Punjab, and Balochistan provinces of Pakistan. They are one of major tribes in the region, and are one of the Hindu groups in Pakistan who are known to have not left Sindh during the Partition of India.

== Culture ==
The Bhils are considered by some to be remaining community of Indus valley civilization The Bhils mostly work as peasants and are very poor. Most of them work labour jobs around the country to sustain themselves. The Human Rights Commission of the United Nations found out that many Bhils, Meghwars, and Kolhis were actually slaves, even after Pakistan had abolished slavery of the Bhil people in 1992. Nearly 95% of the Sindhi Bhils live in Thar desert in rural areas in Tharparkar, Umerkot, Badin, Thatta, and Mohrano as well as in cities like Mirpur Khas, Hyderabad, and Karachi. Many Bhils of interior Sindh frequently sacrifice animals to their 'goddesses', a tradition which has died off in recent years.

== Language ==
Many Bhils speak Sindhi Bhil, a distinct variety of Sindhi with Sanskrit influences. Some speak Dhatki dialect of Sindhi and some speak Marwari and others speak other dialects of Sindhi, and Saraiki.

== History ==
Bheels are one of the very oldest tribes in Sindh and Gandava (in Balochistan) was one of the provincial headquarters of the Bhil dynasty.

== Notable people ==
- Krishan Bheel - Leader
- Poonjo Mal Bheel - Leader

== See also ==
- Sindhi Meghwars
- Sindhi Bhili dialect
- Kolhi
- Bagri
- Oad
