= Sindhi Bhili =

Indo-Aryan language spoken in Pakistan

Sindhi Bhil
- سنڌي ڀيل
- Sindhi Bhil written in the Arabic script.
- Native to: Pakistan
- Region: Sindh
- Ethnicity: Meghwar Bhil
- Native speakers: (60,000 cited 2000)
- Language family: Indo-European: Indo-Iranian; Indo-Aryan; Northwestern; Sindhi languages; Sindhi Bhil
- Dialects: Badin; Mohrano; Nuclear Sindhi Bhil; Sindhi Meghwar
- Writing system: Arabic script, Devanagari script (religious use only)

Language codes
- ISO 639-3: sbn
- Glottolog: sind1270

Sindhi Bhil, (سنڌي ڀيل) is an Indo-Aryan dialect spoken in the Pakistani province of Sindh, as well as some parts of Balochistan. Sindhi Bhil is often referred to as a Sindhi dialect rather than a separate language alongside Lasi.

== Characteristics ==
Sindhi Bhil is known to have many old Sindhi words, which were lost after Arabic, Persian, and Chaghatai words were absorbed into Sindhi. Sindhi Bhil's Badin dialect is closest to Sindhi. The Mohrano speakers have added many Dhatki words into their language, and some say the Mohrano dialect of Sindhi Bhil may be considered a different language due to the number of Dhatki loanwords it has.

== Speakers ==
The Sindhi Bhils and Sindhi Meghwars are the speakers of Sindhi Bhil and are Hindu and number around 86,500. They live in Balochistan and Sindh, while there are diasporas in Gujarat and Delhi in India due to the Partition of India. They are part of the Bhil people.

== Dialects ==
Sindhi Bhil has four dialects. The most spoken is Badin which has around 10,000 speakers. It is spoken in the city of Badin and also Matli. Other dialects include Mohrano, Nuclear Sindhi Bhil, and Sindhi Meghwar. Mohrano is spoken in Tando Allahyar.

== See also ==
- سنڌي_ڀيل_ٻولي (Sindhi Bhil in Sindhi language)
