= Saraiki alphabet =

Writing system used for Saraiki

Saraiki has three main systems for writing, which are the Multani script, Shahmukhi (modified Perso-Arabic script) and in Gurmukhi.

== Multani script ==
Multani is a Brahmic script originating in the Multan region of Punjab. The script was used for routine writing and commercial activities. Multani is one of four Laṇḍā scripts whose usage was extended beyond the mercantile domain and formalized for literary activity and printing; the others being Gurmukhi, Kiṛakkī, Khojki and Khudabadi. Although Multani is now obsolete, it is a historical script in which written and printed records exist.

Traders or bookkeepers wrote in a script known as Langdi, although use of this script has been significantly reduced in recent times. Preliminary Proposal to Encode the Multani Script in ISO/IEC 10646 was submitted by Anshuman Pandey, on 26–04–2011. Saraiki Unicode has been approved in 2005.

== Perso-Arabic script ==
The most common writing system for Saraiki today is Shahmukhi, based on the Perso-Arabic script. It is non-standardized and is generally written with an extension to the standard Shahmukhi alphabet. Saraiki has a 43-letter alphabet which include four letters that are not used in standard Shahmukhi (in fact, those letters were straight-up borrowed from Sindhi). Another difference the Saraiki alphabet has with standard Shahmukhi is the disuse of the already uncommon Lam with tah above which is present in the standard form.

=== Alphabet Table ===
Saraiki Shahmukhi alphabet
Letter	Name of Letter	Transcription	IPA
ا	alif	ā, a, e, ē, o, i, u	/a/, /ə/, /e/, /ɛ/, /o/, /ɪ/, /ʊ/
ب	be	b	/b/
ٻ	ɓe	ɓ/bb	/ɓ/
پ	pe	p	/p/
ت	te	t	/t/
ٹ	ṭe	ṭ	/ʈ/
ث	se	(s)	/s/
ج	jīm	j	/d͡ʒ/
ڄ	ʄe	ʄ/jj	/ʄ/
چ	ce	c	/t͡ʃ/
ح	baṛī he	(h)	/ɦ/
خ	xe	x	/x/
د	dāl	d	/d/
ڈ	ḍāl	ḍ	/ɖ/
ݙ	ɗāl	ɗ/dd	/ᶑ/
ذ	zāl	(z)	/z/
ر	re	r	/r/
ڑ	ṛe	ṛ	/ɽ/
ز	ze	z	/z/
ژ	že	ž	/ʒ/
س	sīn	s	/s/
ش	šīn	š	/ʃ/
ص	suād	(s)	/s/
ض	zuād	(z)	/z/
ط	to'e	(t)	/t/
ظ	zo'e	(z)	/z/
ع	‘ain	(‘/'), (a), (e), (ē), (o), (i), (u)	/∅/, /ə/, /e/, /ɛ/, /o/, /ɪ/, /ʊ/
غ	ǧain	ǧ	/ɣ/
ف	fe	f	/f/
ق	qāf	q	/q/
ک	kāf	k	/k/
گ	gāf	g	/g/
ڳ	ɠāf	ɠ/gg	/ɠ/
ل	lām	l	/l/
م	mīm	m	/m/
ن	nūn	n	/n/
ں	nūn ǧunnā	_̃	/◌̃/
ݨ	ṇūn	ṇ	/ɳ/
و	vāv	w, v, ū, ō	/v/
ہ	choṭī he	h	/ɦ/
ھ	do cašmī he	_h	/◌ʰ/, /◌ʱ/
ی	choṭī ye	y, ī	/j/, /i/
ے	baṛī ye	e, ē	/e/, /ɛ/

=== Notes ===
Saraiki has 4 additional glyphs that are not present in its parent alphabet of standard Shahmukhi. ٻ represents the Voiced bilabial implosive, ڄ represents the Voiced palatal implosive, ڳ represents the Voiced velar implosive, and ݙ represents the Voiced retroflex implosive. 3 out of the 4 implosive consonants (ٻ,ڄ,ڳ) are shared with the Sindhi alphabet, and ݙ was proposed in 2002 to differentiate from ڏ of Sindhi.

Saraiki also lacks the phoneme /ʒ/, and therefore, employs other phonemes such as /ʃ/ to represent the letter ژ. Due to this, ژ is only used in loanwords.

=== Diacritics ===
- (ئ ؤ and stand alone ء) hamza: indicates a glottal stop.
- ḥarakāt (In Arabic: حركات also called تشكيل tashkīl):
  - (ــَـ) fatḥa (a)
  - (ــِـ) kasra (i)
  - (ــُـ) ḍamma (u)
  - (ــْـ) sukūn (no vowel)
- (ــٰـ) superscript alif (also "short" or "dagger alif": A replacement for an original alif that is dropped in the writing out of some rare words, e.g. لاكن is not written out with the original alif found in the word pronunciation, instead it is written out as لٰكن.
- (ــّـ) shadda: Gemination (doubling) of consonants.
- (--ٖ--) Arabic subscript alef (U+0656), KhaRRi Zeer
- (___ٗ__) Inverted Zamma, Ulti Pesh, Such as in : کٗرتا، مٗردا
- (___٘__) Ghunna, over the noon
- Tanween
ـٌ ـٍ ـً
  - (__ً_) ݙو زبر
  - (ٍ--) ݙو زیر
  - (____) ݙو پیش

=== Numerals ===
Like Standard Punjabi in Shahmukhi, Saraiki also uses the Eastern Arabic numerals:

Hindu–Arabic	0	1	2	3	4	5	6	7	8	9
Saraiki	۰	۱	۲	۳	۴	۵	۶	۷	۸	۹

== Gurmukhi script ==
The Gurmukhi script, written from left to right, was used by both Hindus and Sikhs around southern Punjab. Though not used in present-day Pakistan, there are still emigrant speakers in India who use the Gurmukhi script for Saraiki.

In Gurmukhi, all the 4 Saraiki implosive consonants: ॻ (ڳ), ॼ (ڄ), ॾ (ݙ) and ॿ (ٻ) are approximated by gemination ligatures.

== Romanization ==
The romanization is often termed "transliteration" but that is not strictly correct, as transliteration is the direct representation of letters by using foreign symbols, but most systems for romanizing Arabic are actually transcription systems that represent the sound of the language. For example, the above rendering munāẓaratu l-ḥurūfi l-ʻarabīyah of the Arabic: مناظرة الحروف العربية is a transcription, indicating the pronunciation; an example of transliteration would be mnaẓrḧ alḥrwf alʻrbyḧ.

For Saraiki, all letters and symbols are used in Saraiki in Latin script.
