= Sindhi language =

Indo-Aryan language native to Sindh

Sindhi
- سِنڌِي; सिन्धी
- Sindhi written in Perso-Arabic and Devanagari
- Pronunciation: [sɪndʱiː]
- Native to: Pakistan and India
- Region: Sindh and surrounding areas
- Ethnicity: Sindhis
- Native speakers: ~38 million
- Language family: Indo-European: Indo-Iranian; Indo-Aryan; Northwestern; Sindhic; Sindhi
- Writing system: Perso-Arabic and Devanagari; Khojki, Khudabadi and Gurmukhi (historically)

Official status
- Official language in: Pakistan; Sindh; India
- Regulated by: Sindhi Language Authority (Pakistan); National Council for Promotion of Sindhi Language (India)

Language codes
- ISO 639-1: sd
- ISO 639-2: snd
- ISO 639-3: snd
- Glottolog: sind1272
- Linguasphere: 59-AAF-f
- The proportion of people with Sindhi as their mother tongue in each Pakistani District as of the 2023 Pakistani Census

Sindhi (/ˈsɪndi/ SIN-dee; Sindhi: سِنڌِي (Perso-Arabic) or सिन्धी (Devanagari), pronounced [sɪndʱiː]) (Note: In historically used scripts: ਸਿੰਧੀ (Gurmukhi), 𑈩𑈭𑈴𑈝𑈮 (Khojki), 𑋝𑋡𑋟𑋐𑋢 (Khudabadi)) is an Indo-Aryan language. It is the official language of the Pakistani province of Sindh. It is also an official scheduled language in India. Sindhi is written in the Perso-Arabic script in Pakistan and both the Perso-Arabic and Devanagari scripts in India.

Sindhi is an inflected language, with five cases for noun, three for personal pronoun, four for third-person pronoun; eleven case markers; two genders (masculine, feminine); and two numbers (singular, plural).

Sindh was one of the first regions in the Indian subcontinent to encounter influence from Persian and Arabic following the Umayyad conquest in 712 AD. A substantial body of Sindhi literature subsequently developed, the most famous of which is the religious and mystic poetry of Shah Abdul Latif Bhittai from the 18th century. Modern Sindhi was promoted under British rule beginning in 1843. The current regulatory agency for the development and promotion of the language in Sindh is the Sindhi Language Authority.

It is spoken by more than 34 million people in Pakistan and by 2.7 million people in India.

== History ==
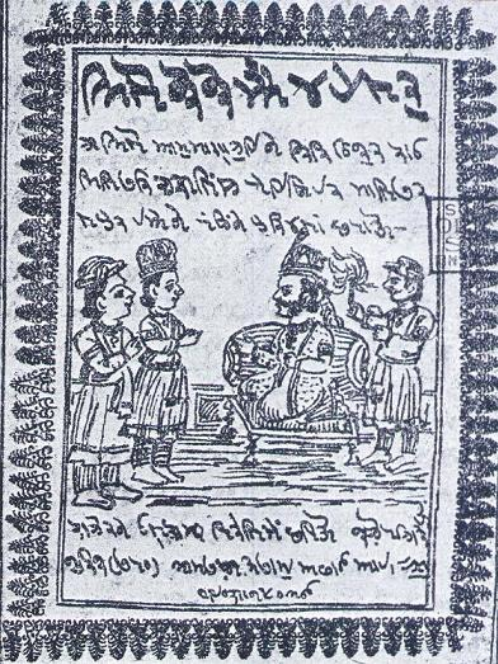
Cover of a book containing the epic Dodo Chanesar written in Hatvanki Sindhi or Khudabadi script.

The name "Sindhi" is derived from the Sanskrit síndhu, the original name of the Indus River, along whose delta Sindhi is spoken. In the Bronze Age (c. 3300 – c. 1200 BCE), the primary language of this region was likely the Harappan language, but no records exist indicating when or how that language was replaced by the Indo-Aryan languages.

Like other languages of the Indo-Aryan family, Sindhi is descended from Old Indo-Aryan (Sanskrit) via Middle Indo-Aryan (Pali, secondary Prakrits, and Apabhramsha). 20th century Western scholars such as George Abraham Grierson believed that Sindhi descended specifically from the Vrācaḍa dialect of Apabhramsha (described by Markandeya as being spoken in Sindhu-deśa, corresponding to modern Sindh) but later work has shown this to be unclear.

The sound changes that characterise the development of Sindhi from Middle Indo-Aryan are:

- Development of implosives from geminate and initial stops (e.g. g-, -gg > ɠ); this is a highly distinctive sound change in NIA
- Shortening of geminates (e.g. MIA akkhi > Sindhi akhi "eye")
- Voicing of post-nasal consonants (e.g. MIA danta > Sindhi ɗ̣andu "tooth")
- Debuccalization of intervocalic -s- > -h-
- Intervocalic -l- > -r- (likely via intermediate retroflex -ḷ-), -ll- > -l-, -ḍ- > -ṛ-
- Fronting of r from medial clusters to initial (e.g. OIA dīrgha > Sindhi ḍrigho "long")

Additionally, the following retentions distinguish Sindhi from other New Indo-Aryan languages:

- Retention of MIA -ṇ-
- Retention of final short vowels -a, -i, -u, but also insertion of these into loanwords
- Retention of long vowels before geminates (more archaic than e.g. Prakrit)
- Retention of stop + r clusters but with retroflexion, e.g. tr- > ṭr-
- Retention of v-

Literary attestation of early Sindhi is sparse. Historically, Isma'ili religious literature and poetry in India, as old as the 11th century CE, used a language that was closely related to Sindhi and Gujarati; at this point, Sindhi was not clearly established as an independent literary language. Much of this work is in the form of ginans (a kind of devotional hymn).

Sindhi was the first Indo-Aryan language to be in close contact with Arabic and Persian following the Umayyad conquest of Sindh in 712 CE. Arabic sources thus do mention the language of Sindh in various instances. The following excerpts are translated from The History of India, as Told by Its Own Historians by Henry Miers Elliot.

The language of Sind is different from that of India. Sind is the country which is nearer to the domains of the Muslims; India is farther from them.

— al-Masudi (c. 896–956 CE), The Meadows of Gold

The language of Mansúra, Multán, and those parts is Arabic and Sindian. In Makrán, they use Persian and Makranic.

— Ibn Hawqal, Surat Al-Ard (977 CE)

Additionally, the Korean Buddhist monk Hyech'o mentions the unique language of Sindh in his travelogue:

From Takka, I walked towards the West for another month and arrived at the country of Sindhukula. The dress, customs, climate, and temperature are similar to north India, although the language is slightly different.

— Hyech'o, Wang och'ŏnch'ukkuk chŏn (c. 723–728 CE)

Medieval Sindhi literature is of a primarily religious genre, comprising a syncretic Sufi and Advaita Vedanta poetry, the latter in the devotional bhakti tradition. The format of this poetry is the bayt, indicating significant influence from Arabic and Persian. The earliest known Sindhi poet of the Sufi tradition is Qazi Qadan (1493–1551). Other early poets were Shah Inat Rizvi (c. 1613–1701) and Shah Abdul Karim Bulri (1538–1623). These poets had a mystical bent that profoundly influenced Sindhi poetry for much of this period.

Another famous part of Medieval Sindhi literature is a wealth of Sindhi folktales, adapted and readapted into verse by many bards at various times and possibly much older than their earliest literary attestations. These include romantic epics such as Sassui Punnhun, Sohni Mahiwal, Momal Rano, Noori Jam Tamachi, Lilan Chanesar, and others.

The greatest poet of Sindhi was Shah Abdul Latif Bhittai (1689/1690–1752), whose verses were compiled into the Shah Jo Risalo by his followers. While primarily Sufi, his verses also recount traditional Sindhi folktales and aspects of the cultural history of Sindh.

The first attested Sindhi translation of the Quran was done by Akhund Azizullah Muttalawi (1747–1824) and published in Gujarat in 1870. The first to appear in print was by Muhammad Siddiq in 1867.

=== British India ===
In 1843, the conquest of Sindh by the British East India Company led the region to become part of the Bombay Presidency. Soon after, in 1848, Governor George Clerk established Sindhi as the official language in the province, removing the literary dominance of Persian. Sir Bartle Frere, the then commissioner of Sindh, issued orders on August 29, 1857, advising civil servants in Sindh to pass an examination in Sindhi. He also ordered the use of Sindhi in official documents. In 1868, the Bombay Presidency assigned Narayan Jagannath Vaidya to replace the abjad used in Sindhi with the Khudabadi script. The script was decreed a standard script by the Bombay Presidency, thus inciting anarchy in the Muslim majority region. A powerful unrest followed, after which twelve martial laws were imposed by the British authorities. The granting of official status of Sindhi along with script reforms ushered in the development of modern Sindhi literature.

The first printed works in Sindhi were produced at the Muhammadi Press in Bombay beginning in 1867. These included Islamic stories set in verse by Muhammad Hashim Thattvi, one of the renowned religious scholars of Sindh.

=== Independent Pakistan and India ===
The partition of India in 1947 resulted in most Sindhi speakers ending up in the new state of Pakistan, commencing a push to establish a strong sub-national linguistic identity for Sindhi. This manifested in resistance to the imposition of Urdu and eventually Sindhi nationalism in the 1980s.

The language and literary style of contemporary Sindhi writings in Pakistan and India were noticeably diverging by the late 20th century; authors from the former country were borrowing extensively from Urdu, while those from the latter were highly influenced by Hindi.

== Geographical distribution ==
Sindhi is the official language of the Pakistani province of Sindh and one of the scheduled languages in the constitution of India.

Sindhi is additionally spoken by many members of the Sindhi diaspora, particularly in Malaysia, Oman, Singapore, UAE, USA and UK.

=== Pakistan ===
In Pakistan, Sindhi is the first language of 34.40 million people, or 14.6% of the country's population as of the 2023 census. 33.46 million of these are found in Sindh, where they account for 60% of the total population of the province. There are 0.55 million speakers in the province of Balochistan, especially in the Kacchi Plain.

2023 Census Statistics
State	Population
Pakistan	34,401,564
Sindh	33,462,299
Balochistan	555,198
Punjab	352,686
Islamabad	21,362
Khyber Pakhtunkhwa	10,019

The Sindh Assembly has ordered compulsory teaching of the Sindhi language in all private schools in Sindh. According to the Sindh Private Educational Institutions Form B (Regulations and Control) 2005 Rules, "All educational institutions are required to teach children the Sindhi language. Sindh Education and Literacy Minister, Syed Sardar Ali Shah, and Secretary of School Education, Qazi Shahid Pervaiz, have ordered the employment of Sindhi teachers in all private schools in Sindh so that this language can be easily and widely taught. Sindhi is taught in all provincial private schools that follow the matric system and not the ones that follow the Cambridge system.

At the occasion of 'Mother Language Day' in 2023, the Sindh Assembly under Culture minister Sardar Ali Shah, passed a unanimous resolution to extend the use of language to the primary level, and to increase the status of Sindhi as a national language of Pakistan.

Many Sindhi-language television channels are broadcasting in Pakistan, such as Time News, KTN, Sindh TV, Awaz Television Network, Mehran TV, and Dharti TV.

=== India ===
The Indian government has legislated Sindhi as a scheduled language in India, making it an option for education. Despite lacking any state-level status, Sindhi is still a prominent minority language in the Indian states of Gujarat, Rajasthan and Maharashtra. In India, Sindhi mother tongue speakers were distributed in the following states:

2011 Census Statistics (Note: This is the number of people who identified their mother-tongue as "Sindhi"; it does not include speakers of related languages, like Kutchi.)
State	Population
India	2,772,264
Gujarat	1,184,024
Maharashtra	723,748
Rajasthan	386,569
Madhya Pradesh	245,161
Chhattisgarh	93,424
Delhi (NCT)	31,177
Uttar Pradesh	28,952
Assam	19,646
Karnataka	16,954
Andhra Pradesh	11,299
Tamil Nadu	8,448
West Bengal	7,828
Uttarakhand	2,863
Odisha	2,338
Bihar	2,227
Jharkhand	1,701
Haryana	1,658
Kerala	1,251
Punjab	754
Goa	656
Dadra and Nagar Haveli and Daman and Diu	894
Meghalaya	236
Chandigarh	134
Puducherry	94
Nagaland	82
Himachal Pradesh	62
Tripura	30
Jammu and Kashmir	19
Andaman and Nicobar Islands	14
Arunachal Pradesh	12
Lakshadweep	7
Sikkim	2

=== Sindhi diaspora ===
In Malaysia, Indonesia, and Singapore (where Sindhi has no official status), ethnic Sindhis are largely shifting to English as their first language, excepting some monolingual first-generation immigrants and second-generation speakers who use Sindhi at home. Codeswitching of varying degrees is observed in some speakers, usually with English but also with Malay and Indonesian. Similar shift to English is found in the smaller Hong Kong Sindhi community.

=== Sindhi speakers by country ===
Country	Population
Pakistan	34,401,564
India	2,772,264
United Arab Emirates	102,000
United States	6,299
Canada	5,315
Singapore	3,971

== Dialects ==
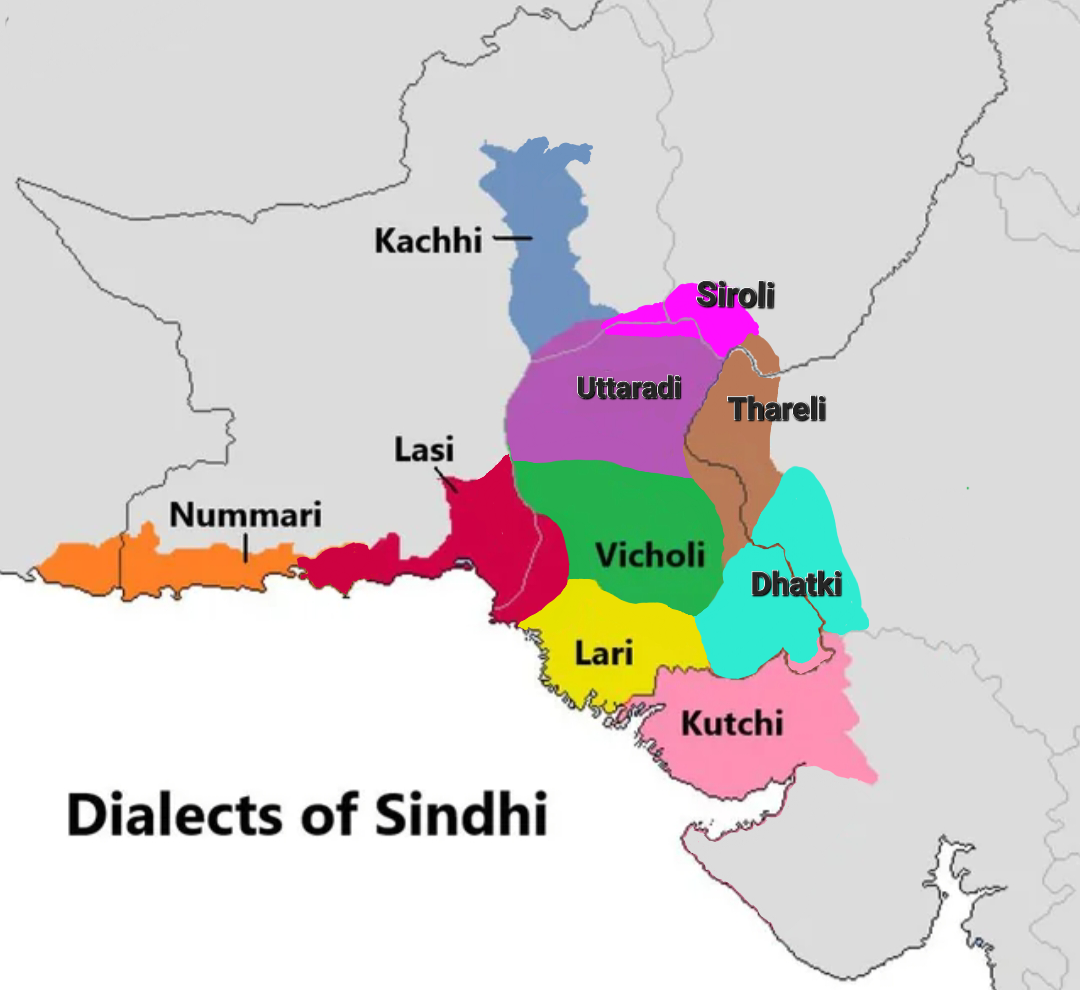
The dialects of Sindhi language shown on map.

Sindhi has many dialects, and forms a dialect continuum at some places with neighboring languages such as Saraiki to the north and Gujarati to the south, but not with Marwari to the east. Some of the documented dialects of Sindhi are:

- Vicholi: The prestige dialect spoken around Hyderabad and central Sindh (the Vicholo region), on which the literary standard is based.
- Uttaradi: The dialect of northern Sindh (Uttaru, meaning "north"), with minor differences in Larkana, Shikarpur and in parts of Sukkur and Kandiaro.
- Lari: The dialect of southern Sindh (Lāṛu) spoken around areas like Karachi, Thatta, Sujawal, Tando Muhammad Khan and Badin districts.
- Siroli (also Siraiki, Ubheji): The dialect of northernmost Sindh (Siro, meaning "head"). Spoken in smaller number all over Sindh but mainly in Jacobabad and Kashmore districts, it may be transitional with the Saraiki language of southern Punjab and has variously been treated either as a dialect of Saraiki or as a dialect of Sindhi.
- Lasi: The dialect of Lasbela, Hub and Gwadar districts in Balochistan, closely related to Lari and Vicholi, and in contact with Balochi.
- Firaqi: The dialect of the Kachhi plains the north eastern districts of Balochistan, where it is referred to as Firaqi Sindhi or commonly just Sindhi.
- Thareli (also Tharechi): Spoken in the northeastern Thar desert of Sindh, but mainly spoken in the western part of Jaisalmer district of Rajasthan, India by many Sindhi Muslims.
- Sindhi Bhili: Spoken in Sindh by the Sindhi Meghwars and Bhils.

Furthermore, Kutchi and Jadgali are sometimes classified as dialects of Sindhi rather than independent languages.

Sindhi dialects Comparison
English	Vicholi	Lari	Uttaradi	Lasi	Kutchi
I	Aao(n)	Aao(n)	Mā(n)	Ã	Aau(n)
My	Muhnjo	Mujo	Mānjo/Māhjo	Mojo/Mājo	Mujo
You "Sin, plu" (formal)	Awha(n)/Awhee(n) Tawha(n)/Tawhee(n)	Aa(n)/Aei(n)	Taha(n)/Taa(n)/ Tahee(n)/Taee(n)	Awa(n)/Ai(n)	Aa(n)/Ai(n)
To me	Mukhe	Muke	Mānkhe	Mukh	Muke
We	Asee(n)	Asee(n), Pān	Asā(n)	Asee(n)	Asee(n), Pān
What	Chha/Kahirō	Kujjāro/Kujja	Chha/Shha	Chho	Kuro
Why	Chho	Ko	Chho/Shho	Chhela	Kolāi/Kurelāe
How	Kiya(n)	Kei(n)	Kiya(n)		Kee(n)
No	Na, Kōna, Kōn	Nā(n), Kīna	Na, Kōna, Kāna, Kon, Kān	Nā(n), Ma	Nā
Legs (plural, fem)	Tangu(n), Jjanghu(n)	Tangu(n), Jjangu(n)	Tangā(n), Jjanghā(n)		
Foot	Pair	Pair/Pagg/Pagulo	Pair	Pair	Pag
Far	Pare	Ddoor	Pare/Parte	Ddor	Chhete
Near	Vejhō	Vejo/Ōdō/Ōdirō/Ore	Vejhō/Vejhe/Orte	Ōddō	Wat, bājūme
Good/Excellent	Sutho, Chaṅō	Khāso/Sutho/Thhāuko	Sutho, Bhalo, Chango	Khāsho	Khāso, Laat
High	Utāho	Ucho	Mathe	Ucho	Ucho
Silver	Rupo	Chādi/Rupo	Chāndi	Rupo	Rupo
Father	Piu	Pay/Abo/Aba/Ada	Pee/Babo/Pirhe(n)	Pe	Pe, Bapa, Ada
Wife	Joe/Gharwāri	Joe/Wani/Kuwār	Zaal/Gharwāri	Zaal	Vahu/Vau
Man	Mardu	Māņu/Mārū/Mard /Murs/Musālu	Mānhu/Musālo/Bhāi /Kāko/Hamra	Mānhu	Māḍū/Mārū
Woman	Aurat	Zāla/ōrat/ōlath	Māi/Ran	Zāla	Bāeḍi/Bāyaḍī
Child/Baby	Bbār/Ningar/Bbālak	Bbār/Ningar/Gabhur/ Bacho/Kako	Bbār/Bacho/Adro/ Phar (animal)	Gabhar	Bār/Gabhar/Chokro
Daughter	Dhiu/Niyāni	Dia/Niyāni/Kañā	Dhee/Adri	Dhia	Dhi/Dhikri
Sun	Siju	Sij, Sūrij	Sijhu	Siju	Sūraj
Sunlight		Kārro	Oosa		Tarko
Cat	Billi	Bili/Pusani	Billi	Phushini	Minni
Rain	Barsāt/Mee(n)h /Bārish	Varsāt/Mee(n)/Mai(n)	Barsāt/Mee(n)hu		Varsāt
And	Aēi(n)	Ãū(n)/Ãē(n)/Nē	Aēi(n)/Aū(n)/Aen	Ãē/Or	Nē/Anē
Also	Pin/Bhi	Pin, Bee	Bu/Pun		Pin/Pan
Is	Āhe	Āye	Aa/Āhe/Hai	Āhe/Āye	Āye
Fire	Bāhe	Bāē/āgg/jjērō	Bāhe/Bāh	Jjērō	Jirō/lagāņō/āg
Water	Pāņī	Pāņī/Jal	Pāņī	Pāņī	Pāņī/Jal
Where	Kithē	Kithē	Kithē, Kāthe, Kehda, Kāday, Kādah, Kidah, Kithrē	Kith	Kidhē/Kidhā
Sleep	Nindr(a)	Nind(a)	Nindr(a)	Nind	Ninder
Slap	Thaparr/Chammāt	Tārr	Chamātu/Chapātu/ Lapātu/Thapu		Thapaat
To Wash	Dhoain(u)	Dhun(u)	Dhoain(u)/Dhuan(u)/ Dhowan(u)		Dhowan
Will write (Masc)	Likhandum, Likhandus	Likhados	Likhdum, Likhdus	Likhdosī	likhdos (m) / likhdis (f)
I Went	Aao(n) Vius	Aao(n) Vēs	Ma(n) Vayus (m)/ Vayas (f)	Ã viosī	Aau vyos (m) / veyis (f)

== Phonology ==
Sindhi has a relatively large inventory of both consonants and vowels compared to other Indo-Aryan languages. Sindhi has 46 consonant phonemes and 10 vowels. The consonant to vowel ratio is around average for the world's languages at 2.8. All plosives, affricates, nasals, the retroflex flap, and the lateral approximant /l/ have aspirated or breathy voiced counterparts. The language also features four implosives.

=== Consonants ===
Sindhi consonants
		Labial		Dental/ alveolar		Retroflex		(Alveolo-) Palatal		Velar		Glottal
Nasal	plain		m م म		n ن न		ɳ ڻ ण		ɲ ڃ ञ		ŋ ڱ ङ 𑊿	
Nasal	breathy		mʱ مهـ म्ह		nʱ نهـ न्ह		ɳʱ ڻهـ ण्ह					
Stop/ Affricate	plain	p پ प	b ب ब	t̪ ت त	d̪ د द	ʈ ٽ ट	ɖ ڊ ड	tɕ چ च 𑋀	dʑ ج ज	k ڪ क 𑊺	ɡ گ ग 𑊼	
Stop/ Affricate	breathy	pʰ ڦ फ	bʱ ڀ भ	t̪ʰ ٿ थ	d̪ʱ ڌ ध	ʈʰ ٺ ठ	ɖʱ ڍ ढ	tɕʰ ڇ छ 𑋁	dʑʱ جهـ झ	kʰ ک ख 𑊻	ɡʱ گهـ घ 𑊾	
Implosive			ɓ ٻ ॿ		ɗ ڏ ॾ				ʄ ڄ ॼ		ɠ ڳ ॻ 𑊽	
Fricative		f ف फ़		s س स	z ز ज़	ʂ ش श ष				x خ ख़ 𑊻𑋩	ɣ غ ग़ 𑊼𑋩	h ه ह
Approximant	plain		ʋ و व		l ل ल				j ي य			
Approximant	breathy				lʱ لهـ ल्ह							
Rhotic	plain				r ر र		ɽ ڙ ड़					
Rhotic	breathy						ɽʱ ڙهـ ढ़					

The retroflex consonants are apical postalveolar and do not involve curling back of the tip of the tongue,, so they could be transcribed [t̠, t̠ʰ, d̠, d̠ʱ n̠ n̠ʱ ɾ̠ ɾ̠ʱ] in phonetic transcription. The affricates /tɕ, tɕʰ, dʑ, dʑʱ/ are laminal post-alveolars with a relatively short release. It is not clear if /ɲ/ is similar, or truly palatal. /ʋ/ is realised as labiovelar [w] or labiodental [ʋ] in free variation, but is not common, except before a stop.

=== Vowels ===
The vowel phonemes of Sindhi on a vowel chart

	Front	Central	Back
Close	i		u
Near-close	ɪ		ʊ
Close-mid	e		o
Mid		ə	
Open-mid	æ		ɔ
Open	æ		ɑ

The vowels are modal length /i e æ ɑ ɔ o u/ and short /ɪ ʊ ə/. Consonants following short vowels are lengthened: /pət̪o/ [pət̪ˑoː] 'leaf' vs. /pɑt̪o/ [pɑːt̪oː] 'worn'.

== Grammar ==
=== Nouns ===
Sindhi nouns distinguish two genders (masculine and feminine), two numbers (singular and plural), and five cases (nominative, vocative, oblique, ablative, and locative). This is a similar paradigm to Punjabi. Almost all Sindhi noun stems end in a vowel, except for some recent loanwords. The declension of a noun in Sindhi is largely determined by its grammatical gender and the final vowel (or if there is no final vowel). Generally, -o stems are masculine and -a stems are feminine, but the other final vowels can belong to either gender.

The different paradigms are listed below with examples. The ablative and locative cases are used with only some lexemes in the singular number and hence not listed, but predictably take the suffixes -ā̃ / -aū̃ / -ū̃ (ABL) and -i (LOC).

		SG			PL			Gloss
		NOM	VOC	OBL	NOM	VOC	OBL	Gloss
M	I	ڇوڪِرو छोकिरो chokiro	ڇوڪِرا छोकिरा chokirā	ڇوڪِري छोकिरे chokire	ڇوڪِرا छोकिरा chokirā	ڇوڪِرا / ڇوڪِرَछोकिरो / छोकिर chokirā / chokira	ڇوڪِرَنِछोकिरनि chokirani	boy
M	II	ٻارُ ॿारु ɓāru	ٻارَ ॿार ɓāra			ٻارو / ٻارَ ॿार /ॿारो ɓāra / ɓāro	ٻارَنِ ॿारनि ɓārani	child
M	III	ساٿِي साथी sāthī		ساٿِيءَ साथीअ sāthīa	ساٿِي साथी sāthī	ساٿيئَرو साथीअरो sāthīaro	ساٿيَنِ साथियनि sāthyani	companion
M	III	رَھاڪُو रहाकू rahākū		رَھاڪُوءَ रहाकूअ rahākūa	رَھاڪُو रहाकू rahākū	رَھاڪُئو रहाकूओ rahākuo	رَھاڪُنِ रहाकुनि rahākuni	inhabitant
M	IV	راجا राजा rājā			راجا / راجائتو राजा / राजाइतो rājā / rājāito		راجائُنِ राजाउनि rājāuni	king
M	IV	سيٺُ सेठु seṭhu			سيٺَ सेठ seṭha		سيٺَنِ सेठनि seṭhani	merchant
F	I	زالَ ज़ाल zāla			زالُون ज़ालूं zālū̃		زالُنِ ज़ालुनि zāluni	woman, wife
F	I	سَسُ ससु sasu			سَسُون ससूं sasū̃		سَسُنِ ससुनि sasuni	mother-in-law
F	II	دَوا दवा davā			دَوائُون दवाऊं davāū̃		دَوائُنِ दवाउनि davāuni	medicine
F	II	راتِ राति rāti			راتيُون रातियूं rātyū̃		راتيُنِ रातियुनि rātyuni	night
F	II	هوٽَل होटल hoṭal			هوٽَلُون होटलूं hoṭalū̃		هوٽَلُنِ होटलुनि hoṭaluni	hotel
F	III	ڳَئُون ॻऊं ɠaū̃		ڳَئُونَ ॻऊंअ ɠaū̃a	ڳَئُون ॻऊं ɠaū̃		ڳَئُونِ ॻऊनि ɠaūni	cow
F	IV	نَدِي नदी nadī		نَدِيءَ नदीअ nadīa	نَديُون नदियूं nadyū̃		نَديُنِ नदियुनि nadyuni	river

A few nouns representing familial relations take irregular declensions with an extension in -r- in the plural. These are the masculine nouns ڀاءُ भाउ bhāu "brother", پِيءُ पिउ pīu "father", and the feminine nouns ڌِيءَ धीअ dhīa "daughter", نُونھَن नूंहं nū̃hã "daughter-in-law", ڀيڻَ भेण bheṇa "sister", ماءُ माउ māu "mother", and جوءِ जोइ joi "wife".

	SG			PL			Gloss
	NOM	VOC	OBL	NOM	VOC	OBL	Gloss
M	ڀاءُ भाउ bhāu			ڀائُرُ / ڀائُرَ भाउरु / भाउर bhāuru / bhāura	ڀائُرَ / ڀائُرو भाउर / भाउरो bhāura / bhāuro	ڀائُرَنِ / ڀائُنِ भाउरनि / भाउनि bhāurani / bhāuni	brother
F	ڌِيءَ / ڌِيءُ धीअ / धीउ dhīa / dhīu			ڌِيئَرُ / ڌِيئَرُون / ڌِيئُون धीअरु / धीअरूं / धीऊं dhīaru / dhīarū̃ / dhīū̃		ڌِيئَرُنِ / ڌِيئُنِ धीअरुनि / धीउनि dhīaruni / dhīuni	daughter

=== Pronouns ===
==== Personal pronouns ====
Personal pronouns
	SG		PL	
	1	2	1	2
NOM	مَان / آئُون मां / आऊं mā̃ / āū̃	تُون तूं tū̃	اَسِين असीं asī̃	تَوِھِين तव्हीं tavhī̃
OBL	مُون मूं mū̃	تو तो to	اَسَان असां asā̃	تَوِھَان तव्हां tavhā̃
GEN	مُنھِنجو मुंहिंजो mũhinjo	تُنھِنجو तुंहिंजो tũhinjo	—N/a	

Like other Indo-Aryan languages, Sindhi has first and second-person personal pronouns as well as several types of third-person proximal and distal demonstratives. These declines in the nominative and oblique cases. The genitive is a special form for the first and second-person singular, but formed as usual with the oblique and case marker جو जो jo for the rest. The personal pronouns are listed to the right.

The third-person pronouns are listed below. Besides the unmarked demonstratives, there are also "specific" and "present" demonstratives. In the nominative singular, the demonstratives are marked for gender. Some other pronouns which decline identically to ڪو को ko "someone" are ھَرڪو हरको har-ko "everyone", سَڀڪو सभको sabh-ko "all of them", جيڪو जेको je-ko "whoever" (relative), and تيڪو तेको te-ko "that one" (correlative).

Third-person pronouns
			Demonstrative							Interrogative	Relative	Correlative
			Unmarked		Specific		Present		Indefinite	Interrogative	Relative	Correlative
			PROX	DIST	PROX	DIST	PROX	DIST	Indefinite	Interrogative	Relative	Correlative
SG	NOM	M	ھِي ही hī	ھُو हू hū	اِھو इहो iho	اُھو उहो uho	اِجهو इझो ijho	اوجهو ओझो ojho	ڪو को ko	ڪيرُ केरु keru	جو जो jo	سو सो so
SG	NOM	F	ھِيءَ हीअ hīa	ھُوءَ हूअ hūa	اِھا इहा ihā	اُھا उहा uhā	اِجها इझा ijhā	اوجها ओझा ojhā	ڪا का kā	ڪيرَ केर kera	جا जा jā	سا सा sā
SG	OBL		ھِنَ हिन hina	ھُنَ हुन huna	اِنهين इन्हें inhẽ	اُنهين उन्हें unhẽ	—N/a		ڪَنْھِن कंहिं kãhĩ		جَنْھِن जंहिं jãhĩ	تَنْھِن तंहिं tãhĩ
PL	NOM		ھِي ही hī	ھُو हू hū	اِھي इहे ihe	اُھي उहे uhe	اِجهي इझे ijhe	اوجهي ओझे ojhe	ڪي के ke	ڪيرَ केर kera	جي जे je	سي से se
PL	OBL		ھِنَنِ हिननि hinani	ھُنَنِ हुननि hunani	اِنهَنِ इन्हनि inhani	اُنهَنِ उन्हनि unhani	—N/a		ڪِنِ किनि kini		جِنِ जिनि jini	تنِ तिनि tini

==== Pronominal suffixes ====
Unlike other Indo-Aryan languages, Sindhi has pronoun suffixes which can be used as an alternative way to express possession instead of possessive pronouns. The pronominal suffixes may also attach to verbs to mark the agent or indirect object. Verbs may take multiple pronominal suffixes to mark both the subject and object. The first person suffix -مان -मां -mi, changes to -مِ -मि -mā̃ when followed by another pronominal suffix as in لِکيوماسِ लिखियोमांसि likhiyomā̃si, "I wrote to him". The use of pronominal suffixes is more common in northern Sindh.

Pronominal suffixes
	SG			PL		
	1	2	3	1	2	3
agent	-مِ -मि -mi	-ِ -इ -i	-ِين -ईं -ī̃ or -ائِين -आईं -āī̃	-سين -सीं -sī̃ or -سُون -सूं -sū̃	-وَ -व -va	-ائُون -आऊं -āū̃
oblique	-مِ -मि -mi	-ِ -इ -i	-سِ -सि -si	-ُون -ऊं -ū̃	-وَ -व -va	-نِ -नि -ni

=== Numerals ===
The word for one has both masculine and feminine forms, هِڪُ/हिकु hiku and هِڪَ/हिक hika respectively, while the other numbers do not decline for gender.

Num.	Cardinal		
0	ٻُڙِي	ॿुड़ी	ɓuṛi
1	هِڪُ	हिकु	hiku
2	ٻَہ	ॿ	ɓa
3	ٽي	टे	ṭe
4	چَارِ	चारि	cāri
5	پَنج	पंज	pañja
6	ڇَھَہ	छह	chaha
7	سَتَ	सत	sata
8	اَٺَ	अठ	aṭha
9	نَوَ	नव	nava

Num.	Cardinal		
10	ڏَھَہ	ॾह	ɗaha
11	يَارَنھَن	यारंहं	yārãhã
12	ٻَارَھَن	ॿारहं	ɓārahã
13	تيرَھَن	तेरहं	terahã
14	چوڏَھَن	चोॾहं	coɗahã
15	پَندرَھَن	पन्द्रहं	pandrahã
16	سورَھَن	सोरहं	sorahã
17	سَترَھَن	सत्रहं	satrahã
18	اَرِڙَھَن / اَٺَارَھَن	अरिड़हं/ अठारहं	ariṛahã / aṭhārahã
19	اُڻوِيھَہ	उणवीह	uṇvīha

=== Postpositions ===
Most nominal relations (e.g. the semantic role of a nominal as an argument to a verb) are indicated using postpositions, which follow a noun in the oblique case. The subject of the verb takes the bare oblique case, while the object may be in nominative case or in oblique case and followed by the accusative case marker کي खे khe.

The postpositions are divided into case markers, which directly follow the noun, and complex postpositions, which combine with a case marker (usually the genitive جو जो jo).

==== Case markers ====
The case markers are listed below.

The postpositions with the suffix -o decline in gender and number to agree with their governor, e.g. ڇوڪِرو جو پِيءُ छोकिरो जो पीउ chokiro j-o pīu "the boy's father" but ڇوڪِر جِي مَاءُ छोकिरो जी माउ chokiro j-ī māu "the boy's mother".

Case markers
Case	Marker	Example	English
Nominative	—	ڇوڪِرو छोकिरो chokiro	the boy
Accusative; Dative	کي खे khe	ڇوڪِري کي छोकिरे खे chokire khe	the boy to the boy
Genitive	جو जो j-o	ڇوڪِري جو छोकिरे जो chokire jo	of the boy
Genitive	سَندو सन्दो sand-o	ڇوڪِري سَندو छोकिरे सन्दो chokire sando	of the boy
Sociative	سُڌو सुधो sudh-o	ڇوڪِري سُڌو छोकिरे सुधो chokire sudho	along with the boy
Comitative; Instrumental	سَان सां sā̃	ڇوڪِري سَان छोकिरे सां chokire sā̃	with the boy
Comitative; Instrumental	سَاڻُ साणु sāṇu	ڇوڪِري سَاڻُ छोकिरे साणु chokire sāṇu	with the boy
Locative	۾ में mẽ	ڇوڪِري ۾ छोकिरे में chokire mẽ	in the boy
Locative	مَنجِهہ मंझि manjhi	ڇوڪِري مَنجِهہ छोकिरे मंझि chokire manjhi	in the boy
Adessive	تي टे te	ڇوڪِري تي छोकिरे टे chokire te	on the boy
Adessive	وَٽِ वटि vaṭi	ڇوڪِري وَٽِ छोकिरे वटि chokire vaṭi	near the boy the boy has...
Orientative	ڏَانھَن ॾांहं ḍā̃hã	ڇوڪِري ڏَانھَن छोकिरे ॾांहं chokire ḍā̃hã	towards the boy
Terminative	تَائيِن ताईं tāī̃	ڇوڪِري تَائيِن छोकिरे ताईं chokire tāī̃	up to the boy
Benefactive	لاءِ लाइ lāi	ڇوڪِري لاءِ छोकिरे लाइ chokire lāi	for the boy
Semblative	وَانگُرُ वांगुरु vānguru	ڇوڪِري وَانگُرُ छोकिरे वांगुरु chokire vānguru	like the boy
Semblative	جَھْڙو जहड़ो jahṛ-o	ڇوڪِري جَھْڙو छोकिरे जहड़ो chokire jahṛo	like the boy

There are several ablative case markers formed from the spatial postpositions and the ablative ending -ā̃. These indicate complex motion such as "from inside of".

Ablative case markers
Marker	Example	English
کَان खां khā̃	ڇوڪِري کَان छोकिरे खां chokire khā̃	from the boy
مَان मां mā̃	ڇوڪِري مَان छोकिरे मां chokire mā̃	from inside the boy
تَان तां tā̃	ڇوڪِري تَان छोकिरे तां chokire tā̃	from upon the boy
ڏَانھَان ॾांहां ḍā̃hā̃	ڇوڪِري ڏَانھَان छोकिरे ॾांहां chokire ḍā̃hā̃	from the direction of the boy

Finally, some case markers are found in medieval Sindhi literature and/or modern poetic Sindhi, and otherwise not used in standard speech.

Obsolete/rare case markers
Case	Marker	Example	English
Accusative; Adessive	ڪَني कने kane	ڇوڪِري ڪَني छोकिरे कने chokire kane	to/near the boy

==== Complex postpositions ====
The complex postpositions are formed with a case marker, usually the genitive but sometimes the ablative. Many are listed below.

سِنڌِي	सिन्धी	Transliteration	Explanation
جي اَڳيَان	जे अॻ्यां	je aɠyā̃	"ahead of, before"; apudessive
جي اَندَرِ	जे अन्दरि	je andari	"inside of"; inessive
جي بَدِرَان	जे बदिरां	je badirā̃	"instead of, in place of"
جي بَرَابَر	जे बराबर	je barābar	"equal to"
جي ٻَاھَرَان	जे ॿाहरां	je ɓāharā̃	"outside of"
کَان ٻَاھَرِ	खां ॿाहरि	khā̃ ɓāhari	"outside of"
جي باري ۾	जे बारे में	je bāre mẽ	"about, concerning"
جي چَوڌَارِي	जे चौधारी	je caudhārī	"around"
جي ھيٺَان	जे हेठां	je heṭhā̃	"below, under"
جي ڪَري	जे करे	je kare	"for, on account of"
جي لَاءِ	जे लाइ	je lāi	"for"
جي مَٿَان	जे मथां	je mathā̃	"above, on top of, upon"
کَان پَري	खां परे	khā̃ pare	"far from"
جي پَارِ	जे पारि	je pāri	"across, on the other side of"
جي پَاسي	जे पासे	je pāse	"on the side of, near"
کَان پوءِ	खां पोइ	khā̃ poi	"after"
جي پُٺيَان	जे पुठियां	je puṭhyā̃	"behind"
جي سَامهون	जे साम्हों	je sāmhõ	"in front of, facing"
کَان سِوَاءِ	खां सिवाइ	khā̃ sivāi	"besides, apart from"
جي وَاسطي	जे वास्ते	je vāste	"for the sake of, on account of"
جي ويجهو	जे वेझो	je vejho	"near"; adessive
جي وِچِ ۾	जे विचि में	je vici mẽ	"between, among"
جي خَاطِرِ	जे ख़ातिरि	je xātiri	"for the sake of"
جي خِلَافِ	जे ख़िलाफ़ि	je xilāfi	"against"
جي ذَرِيعي	जे ज़रिये	je zarī'e	"via, through"; perlative

=== Verbs ===
==== Copula ====
The copula is used as an auxiliary verb to form the conjugations of other verbs.

personal forms of "huaṇu"
			singular			plural		
			1st	2nd	3rd	1st	2nd	3rd
indicative	present		āhiyā̃	āhī̃	āhe	āhiyū̃	āhiyo	āhini
indicative	imperfective	masculine	hosi	huī̃	huo	huāsī̃	huā	huā
indicative	imperfective	feminine	huiasi	huiā̃	huī	huiū̃sī̃	huiū̃	huiū̃
indicative	future	masculine	hūndusi	hūndē̃	hūndo	hūndāsī̃	hūnda'u	hūndā
indicative	future	feminine	hūndiasī̃	hūndiā̃	hūndī	hūndiū̃sī̃	hūndiū̃	hūndiū̃
subjunctive			huā̃	huē̃	hue	hū̃	huo	huani

Sindhi verbs have two conjugations, one with a characteristic a which consists of passive and intransitive verbs, and the other, with a characteristic i which consists of transitive verbs, including causal verbs..

The infinitive form of verbs is formed by adding -aṇu to the verb root. If the root ends in a long ī, or ū, then they are shortened to i and u respectively. In the i-conjugation, -iṇu is added if the verb root ends in a or ā..

The imperative forms have three conjugation patterns based on whether the verb stem is intransitive, transitive, or passive.

Imperative endings
	singular	plural
intransitive	-u	-o
transitive	-i	-yo
passive	-i or -ãy	-o

==== Participles ====
The present participle for active verbs is formed by adding -ando to a-conjugation verbs, and -īndo to i-conjugation verbs or a-conjugation verbs ending in ā.

The past participle is formed by adding -yo to the root, unless it ends in a c, ch. j, or jh in which case, the y is dropped, leaving -o. It carries a passive meaning as with other Indo-Aryan languages. Sindhi displays a far greater number of irregular past participle forms than other Indo-Aryan languages.

The future passive participle is formed by adding -iṇo to the stem of the infinitive form of verbs. If the infinitive stem ends in -i, then -aṇo is added instead. It is only used with transitive verbs.

The conjunctive participle has three forms. The most common form involves adding -ī or -e to the root, where -ī is added to a-conjugation verbs, and -e is added to i-conjugation verbs. The second form involves adding -yo or -yū̃, where the form in -yo is not always identical to the pass participle form if the verb is irregular. The third form involves adding -ije to transitive verbs or -ijī to intransitive verbs. The i in this form is often dropped.

The agent noun of verbs can be formed by adding either -vāro, or -hāru to the oblique form of the infinitive. The latter has the meaning of the future active participle.

=== Adverbs ===
Adverbs are indeclinable in Sindhi.

=== Syntax ===
Sindhi has subject-object-verb word order.

=== Vocabulary ===
According to historian Nabi Bux Baloch, most Sindhi vocabulary is from ancient Sanskrit. However, owing to the influence of the Persian language over the Indian subcontinent, Sindhi has adapted many words from Persian and Arabic. It has also borrowed from English and Hindustani. Today, Sindhi in Pakistan is slightly influenced by Urdu, with more borrowed Perso-Arabic elements, while Sindhi in India is influenced by Hindi, with more borrowed tatsam Sanskrit elements.

== Writing systems ==
Sindhis in Pakistan use a version of the Perso-Arabic script with new letters adapted to Sindhi phonology, while in India a greater variety of scripts is in use, including Devanagari and historically Khudabadi, Khojki, and Gurmukhi. Perso-Arabic for Sindhi was also made digitally accessible relatively earlier.

The earliest attested records in Sindhi are from the 15th century. Before the standardisation of Sindhi orthography, numerous forms of Devanagari and Laṇḍā scripts were used for trading. For literary and religious purposes, a Perso-Arabic script developed by Abul-Hasan as-Sindi and Gurmukhi (a subset of Laṇḍā) were used. Another two scripts, Khudabadi and Shikarpuri, were reforms of the Landa script. During British rule in the late 19th century, the Perso-Arabic script was decreed standard over Devanagari.

=== Perso-Arabic script ===
During the British Raj, a variant of the Persian alphabet was adopted for Sindhi in the 19th century. The script is used in Pakistan and India today. It has a total of 52 letters, augmenting the Persian with digraphs and eighteen new letters (ڄ ٺ ٽ ٿ ڀ ٻ ڙ ڍ ڊ ڏ ڌ ڇ ڃ ڦ ڻ ڱ ڳ ڪ) for sounds particular to Sindhi and other Indo-Aryan languages. Some letters that are distinguished in Arabic or Persian are homophones in Sindhi.

The table presents the Sindhi Perso-Arabic alphabet. Letters shaded in yellow are solely used in writing of loanwords, and the phonemes they represent are also represented by other letters in the alphabet. Letters and digraphs shaded in green aren't usually considered part of the base alphabet. They are either commonly used digraphs representing aspirated consonants, or are ligatures serving a grammatical function. These ligatures include the ۽, which is pronounced as [ãĩ̯] and represents and, and the ۾, which is pronounced as [mẽ] and creates a locative relationship between words.

Sindhi alphabet
Perso-Arabic [IPA]	ا [∅]/[ʔ] /[ɑː]	ب [b]	ٻ [ɓ]	ڀ [bʱ]	ت [t]	ٿ [tʰ]
Perso-Arabic [IPA]	ٽ [ʈ]	ٺ [ʈʰ]	ث [s]	پ [p]	ج [d͡ʑ]	ڄ [ʄ]
Perso-Arabic [IPA]	جهہ [d͡ʑʰ]	ڃ [ɲ]	چ [t͡ɕ]	ڇ [t͡ɕʰ]	ح [h]	خ [x]
Perso-Arabic [IPA]	د [d]	ڌ [dʱ]	ڏ [ɗ]	ڊ [ɖ]	ڍ [ɖʱ]	ذ [z]
Perso-Arabic [IPA]	ر [r]	ڙ [ɽ]	ڙهہ [ɽʰ]	ز [z]	ژ [ʒ]	س [s]
Perso-Arabic [IPA]	ش [ʂ]	ص [s]	ض [z]	ط [t]	ظ [z]	ع [ɑː] /[oː] /[eː] /[ʔ] /[∅]
Perso-Arabic [IPA]	غ [ɣ]	ف [f]	ڦ [pʰ]	ق [q]	ڪ [k]	ک [kʰ]
Perso-Arabic [IPA]	گ [ɡ]	ڳ [ɠ]	گهہ [ɡʱ]	ڱ [ŋ]	ل [l]	لهہ [lʱ]
Perso-Arabic [IPA]	مـ [m]	مهہ [mʰ]	ن [n] /[◌̃]	نهہ [nʰ]	ڻ [ɳ]	ڻهہ [ɳʰ]
Perso-Arabic [IPA]	و [ʋ] /[ʊ] /[oː] /[ɔː] /[uː]	ھ [h]	هـ ه [h]	ـہ ہ [ə]/[əʰ]/[∅]	ء [ʔ] /[∅]	ي [j] /[iː]
Perso-Arabic [IPA]	۽ [ãĩ̯]	۾ [mẽ]				

The orthography of the letter hāʾ in Sindhi, especially as it comes to typing as opposed to handwriting, has been a source of confusion for many. Especially because whereas in Arabic and Persian, there exists one single letter for hāʾ, in Urdu, the letter has diverged into two distinct variants: gol he ("round he") and do-cašmi he ("two-eyed he"). The former is written is written round and zigzagged as "ہـ ـہـ ـہ ہ", and can impart the "h" (/ɦ/) sound anywhere in a word, or the long "a" or the "e" vowels (/ɑː/ or /eː/) at the end of a word. The latter is written in Arabic Naskh style (as a loop) (ھ), in order to be used in digraphs and to create aspirated consonants.

For most aspirated consonants, Sindhi relies on unique letters as opposed to the Urdu practice of digraphs. However, this doesn't apply to all aspirated consonants. Some are still written as digraphs. The letter hāʾ is also used in Sindhi to represent the sound [h] in native Sindhi words, in Arabic and Persian loanwords, and to represent vowels (/ə/ or /əʰ/) at the end of the word. The notations and conventions in Sindhi are different from those of either Persian or Arabic and from those of Urdu. Given the variety of types of hāʾ across these languages for which Unicode characters have been designed, for the letters to be displayed correctly when typing, a correct and consistent convention needs to be followed. The following table will present these in detail.

Unicode	Letter or Digraphs				IPA	Note	Examples
Unicode	Final	Medial	Initial	Isolated	IPA	Note	Examples
U+06BE	ـھ	ـھـ	ھـ	ھ	[h]		دوھَ⹁ ھُو⹁ مھينن⹁ ويھُ
U+0647	ـه	ـھـ	ھـ	ھ	[h]	Used for borrowed words	وحدهُ لا⹁ والله
U+062C + U+0647	ـجهہ	ـجهـ	جهـ	جهہ	[d͡ʑʰ]	In isolated and final positions, an extra hāʾ ـہ (U+06C1) is added	ٻاجَهہ⹁ اُجِهي⹁ منجهان⹁ ڪُجهہ
U+06AF + U+0647	ـگهہ	ـگهـ	گهـ	گهہ	[ɡʱ]	In isolated and final positions, an extra hāʾ ـہ (U+06C1) is added	گهہ⹁ گهوٽُ⹁ گهڻگُهرون⹁ سگهہ
U+0647	ـهہ	ـهـ	-		[◌ʰ]	Forming part of digraph for representation of other aspirated consonants ([ɽʰ], [lʱ], [mʰ], [nʰ], [ɳʰ]). In isolated and final positions, an extra hāʾ ـہ (U+06C1) is added	ٻنهي⹁ ٿالهہ
U+06C1	ـہ	-		ہ	[ə] / [əʰ] / [∅]		نہ

The punctuation of Sindhi Perso-Arabic script differs slightly from that of Urdu, Persian, and Arabic. Namely, instead of using the typical inverted comma (، [U+060C]) common in these mentioned alphabet, a reversed comma (⹁ [U+2E41]) is used, although many documents do indeed incorrectly use Urdu punctuations.

Comparison of Punctuations
	Full Stop	Comma	‌ Semicolon
Sindhi	.	⹁	⁏
Urdu	۔	،	؛
Persian/Arabic	.	،	؛

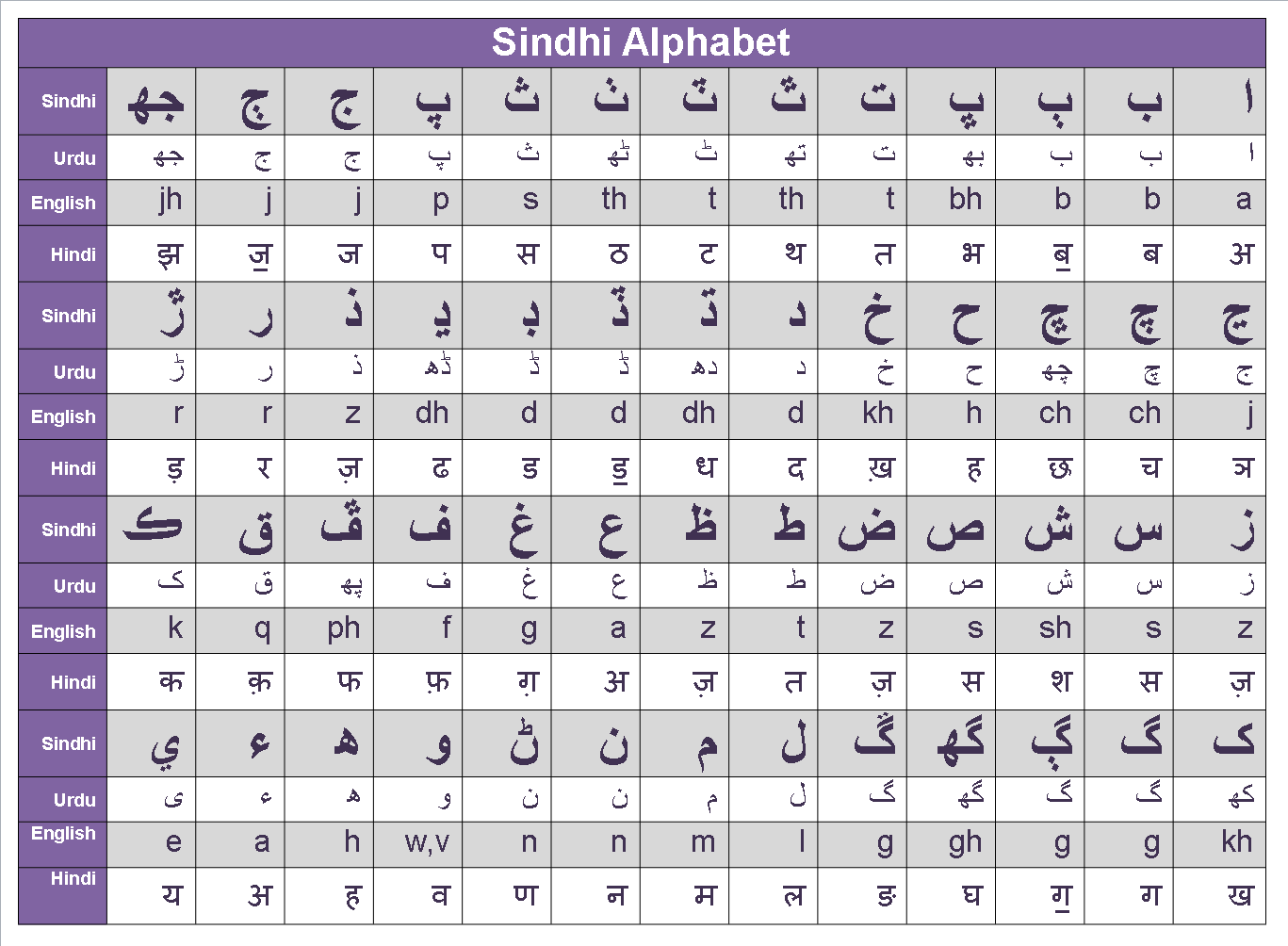
Farsi (perso-Arabic) or Shikarpuri Sindhi.

=== Devanagari script ===
In India, the Devanagari script is also used to write Sindhi. A modern version was introduced by the government of India in 1948; however, it did not gain full acceptance, so both the Sindhi-Arabic and Devanagari scripts are used. In India, a person may write a Sindhi language paper for a Civil Services Examination in either script. Devanagari was seen as the most practical option for the Sindhi language in India. Diacritical bars below the letter are used to mark implosive consonants, and dots called nukta are used to form other additional consonants.

अ	आ	इ	ई	उ	ऊ	ए	ऐ	ओ	औ
ə	a	ɪ	i	ʊ	uː	e	ɛ	o	ɔ
क	ख	ख़	ग	ॻ	ग़		घ		ङ
k	kʰ	x	ɡ	ɠ	ɣ		ɡʱ		ŋ
च	छ		ज	ॼ	ज़		झ		ञ
t͡ɕ	t͡ɕʰ		d͡ʑʰ	ʄ	z		d͡ʑ		ɲ
ट	ठ		ड	ॾ	ड़		ढ	ढ़	ण
ʈ	ʈʰ		ɖ	ɗ	ɽ		ɖʱ	ɽʱ	ɳ
त	थ		द				ध		न
t	tʰ		d				dʱ		n
प	फ	फ़	ब	ॿ			भ		म
p	pʰ	f	b	ɓ			bʱ		m
य	र	ल	व						
j	r	l	ʋ						
श	ष	स	ह						
ʂ	ʂ	s	h						

=== Laṇḍā scripts ===
Laṇḍā-based scripts, such as Gurmukhi, Khojki, and the Khudabadi script, were used historically to write Sindhi.

==== Khudabadi ====
The Khudabadi alphabet was invented in 1550 CE, and was used alongside other scripts by the Hindu community until the colonial era, where the sole usage of the Arabic script for official purposes was legislated. The script continued to be used on a smaller scale by the trader community until the partition of India in 1947.

Vowels
𑊰 IPA: ə	𑊱 IPA: a	𑊲 IPA: ɪ	𑊳 IPA: i	𑊴 IPA: ʊ
𑊵 IPA: uː	𑊶 IPA: e	𑊷 IPA: ɛ	𑊸 IPA: o	𑊹 IPA: ɔ

Consonants
𑊺 IPA: k	𑊻 IPA: kʰ	𑊼 IPA: ɡ	𑊽 IPA: ɠ	𑊾 IPA: ɡʱ		𑊿 IPA: ŋ
𑋀 IPA: c	𑋁 IPA: cʰ	𑋂 IPA: ɟ	𑋃 IPA: ʄ	𑋄 IPA: ɟʱ		𑋅 IPA: ɲ
𑋆 IPA: ʈ	𑋇 IPA: ʈʰ	𑋈 IPA: ɖ	𑋉 IPA: ɗ	𑋋 IPA: ɖʱ	𑋊 IPA: ɽ	𑋌 IPA: ɳ
𑋍 IPA: t	𑋎 IPA: tʰ	𑋏 IPA: d		𑋐 IPA: dʱ		𑋑 IPA: n
𑋒 IPA: p	𑋓 IPA: pʰ	𑋓𑋩 IPA: f	𑋔 IPA: b	𑋕 IPA: ɓ	𑋖 IPA: bʱ	𑋗 IPA: m
𑋘 IPA: j	𑋙 IPA: r	𑋚 IPA: l	𑋛 IPA: ʋ			
𑋜 IPA: ʂ		𑋝 IPA: s	𑋞 IPA: h			

Numerals
0 𑋰	1 𑋱	2 𑋲	3 𑋳	4 𑋴	5 𑋵	6 𑋶	7 𑋷	8 𑋸	9 𑋹

==== Khojki ====
Khojki was employed primarily to record Muslim Shia Ismaili religious literature, as well as literature for a few secret Shia Muslim sects.

==== Gurmukhi ====
The Gurmukhi script was also used to write Sindhi, mainly in India by Hindus.

=== Roman Sindhi ===
Romanised Sindhi is usually used by Sindhis when texting messages on their mobile phones.

== Sample text ==
Below is Article 1 of the Universal Declaration of Human rights in the various sripts used to write Sindhi:

=== Perso-Arabic Script ===
دفعه ١۔ سمورا انسان آزاد ۽ عزت ۽ حقن جي حوالي کان برابر پيدا ٿيا آھن. انھن کي عقل ۽ ضمير حاصل ٿيو آھي، ان ڪري انھن کي ھڪ ٻئي سان ڀائيچاري وارو سلوڪ اختيار ڪرڻ گھرجي.

=== Devanagari ===
दफ़अ १: समूरा इंसान आज़ाद ऐं इज़्ज़त ऐं हक़न जी हवाले खां बराबर पैदा थिया आहिन। इन्हन खे अक़्ल ऐं ज़मीर हासिल थियो आहे, इन करे इन्हन खे हिक ॿिए सां भाईचारे वारो सुलूक इख़्तियार करण घुरजे॥

=== Romanisation ===
Dafa 1. Samūrā insān āzād aĩ 'izzat aĩ haqan jī havālē khā̃ barābar paidā thiyā āhin. Inhan khē aqul aĩ zamīr hāsil thiyō āhē, in karē inhan khē hik ɓiē sā̃ bhāīchārē vārō sulūk ikhtiyār karaṇ ghurjē.

=== IPA Transliteration ===
d̪əfə eːk. səmuːɾaː ɪnsaːn aːzaːd̪ ɛ̃ ɪzːət̪ ɛ̃ həqən d͡ʒiː həʋaːleː kʰãː bəɾaːbəɾ pɛːd̪aː tʰɪjaː aːhɪn. ɪnʱən kʰeː əqʊl ɛ̃ zəmiːɾ haːsɪl tʰɪjoː aːheː, ɪn kəɾeː ɪnʱən kʰeː hɪk ɓɪ.eː sãː bʱaːiːt͡ʃaːɾeː ʋaːɾoː sʊluːk ɪxt̪ɪjaːɾ kəɾəɳ gʱʊɾd͡ʒeː

=== Translation ===
Article 1: All human beings are born free and equal in dignity and rights. They are endowed with reason and conscience and should act towards one another in a spirit of brotherhood.

== Advocacy ==
The 1972 Sindhi Language Bill was passed by the provincial assembly of Sindh, which saw Sindhi given official status, thus becoming the first provincial language in Pakistan to have its own official status.

- Sindhi language was made the official language of Sindh according to Language Bill.
- All Educational institutes in Sindh are mandated to teach Sindhi as per the bill.

=== Software ===
By 2001, Abdul-Majid Bhurgri had coordinated with Microsoft to develop Unicode-based Software in the form of the Perso-Arabic Sindhi script, which afterwards became the basis for the communicated use by Sindhi speakers around the world. In 2016, Google introduced the first automated translator for the Sindhi language. Later on in 2023 an offline support was introduced by Google Translate. Which was followed by Microsoft Translator strengthening support in May of same year.

In June 2014, the Khudabadi script of the Sindhi language was added to Unicode, However as of now the script currently has no proper rendering support to view it in unsupported devices.

== See also ==
- Sindhology
- Institute of Sindhology
- Sindhi transliteration
- Sindhi media
- Sindhi cinema
- Sindhi television
- Sindhi music
- Sindhi poetry

=== Lists ===
- List of Sindhi films
- List of Sindhi singers
- List of Sindhi poets

=== Languages ===
- Languages of India
- Languages of Pakistan
- Languages with official status in India
- Kholosi language
- Luwati language

== Sources ==
- Nihalani, Paroo (1974). "Lingual Articulation of Stops in Sindhi". Phonetica. 30 (4): 197–212. doi:10.1159/000259489. ISSN 1423-0321. PMID 4424983. S2CID 3325314.
- Addleton and Brown (2010). Sindhi: An Introductory Course for English Speakers. South Hadley: Doorlight Publications. Archived from the original on 2010-08-28.
- Bughio, M. Qasim (January–June 2006). Maniscalco, Fabio Maniscalco (ed.). "The Diachronic Sociolinguistic Situation in Sindh". Web Journal on Cultural Patrimony. 1.
- Cole, Jennifer S (2001). "Sindhi". In Garry, Jane; Rubino, Carl (eds.). Facts About the World's Languages. H W Wilson. pp. 647–653. ISBN 0-8242-0970-2.
- International Phonetic Association. Cambridge University Press. 1999. ISBN 0-521-63751-1.
- Khubchandani, Lachman M (2003). "Sindhi". In Cardona, George; Jain, Dhanesh (eds.). The Indo-Aryan Languages. Routledge. pp. 622–658. ISBN 978-0-415-77294-5.
- Ladefoged, Peter; Maddieson, Ian (1996). The Sounds of the World's Languages. Oxford: Blackwell. ISBN 0-631-19815-6.
- Masica, Colin P. (1991). The Indo-Aryan languages. Cambridge language surveys. Cambridge University Press. p. 443. ISBN 978-0-521-23420-7.
- Shackle, Christopher (2007). "Pakistan". In Simpson, Andrew (ed.). Language and national identity in Asia. Oxford linguistics Y. Oxford University Press. ISBN 978-0-19-922648-1.
- Trumpp, Ernest (1872). Grammar of the Sindhi Language. London: Trübner and Co. ISBN 81-206-0100-9.
- Chopra, R. M (2013). "Persian in Sindh". The rise, growth, and decline of Indo-Persian literature (2nd ed.). New Delhi: Iran Culture House. OCLC 909254259.
- Grierson, George Abraham (1903–1928). Linguistic Survey of India. Vol. 8. India: Office of the Superintendent of Government Printing.
