= Kolhi =

Subset of Koli community in Pakistan

Kohli
- Subset of Larger Koli caste
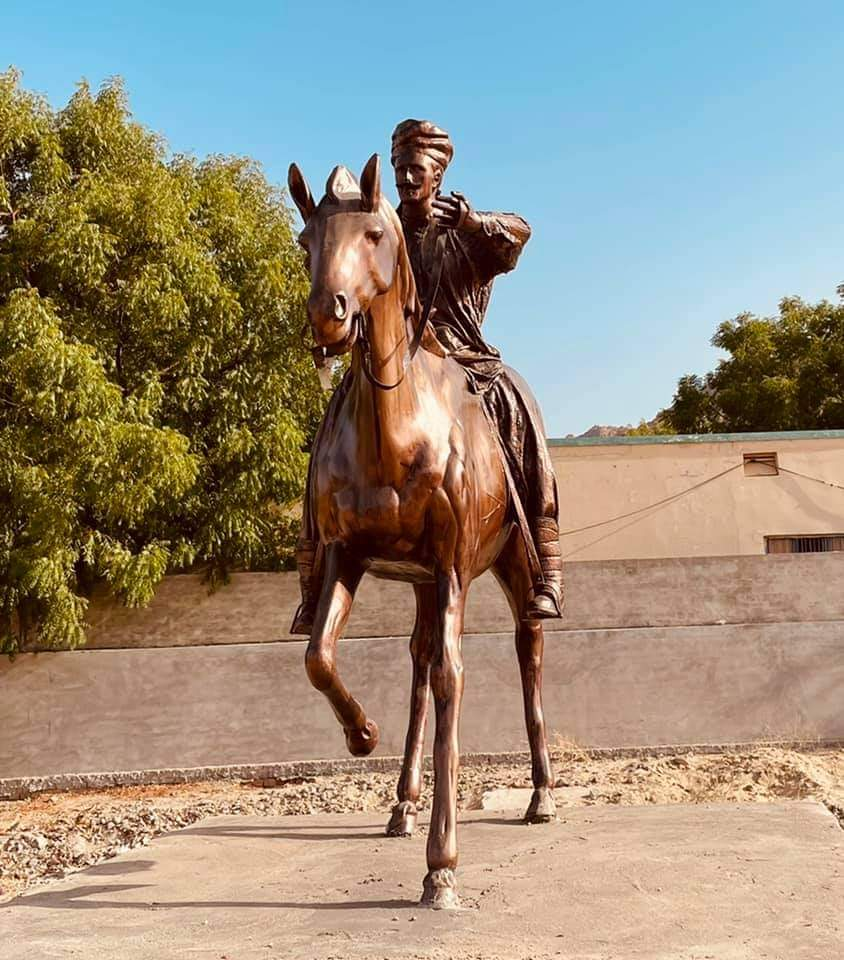
- Statue of Rooplo Kolhi, legendary hero for Kolhis of Sindh
- Ethnicity: Sindhi
- Location: Sindh, Pakistan
- Varna: Agriculturist
- Demonym: Koli
- Branches: Kori; Koli Christians
- Language: Sindhi; Kachi Koli; Parkari Koli; Wadiyara Koli
- Religion: Hinduism; Islam
- Surnames: Patel; Thakor; Kotwal; Pagi; Garasia; Mewasi

The Kolhi (Sindhi: ڪولهي) is a subgroup of the Koli caste native to Sindh, Pakistan. Kolhis are mostly Hindus but some of them are Koli Christians or Muslim Kolis. They engage in agriculture; most of them are poor peasants and sharecroppers.

The Kolhi caste is said to have originated in Gujarat. They migrated from there first to Kutch, then to Thar and Parkar. Kolhis have subcastes such as Thakor, Khant, Baria and Chunvalia.

== Divisions ==
There are four communities of Kolhis in Sindh; firstly Parkari Kolhis, who are native to Nangarparker region and who speak Parkari Koli language, secondly Kutchi Kolhi, who migrated from Kutch district of India to Sindh, and who speak the Kachhi Kolhi language and live in Mirpurkhas, Hyderabad, and Tando Allahyar districts of Sindh, thirdly Wadiyara Kolhi who came from Wadiyar in Gujarat state and speak Wadiyari Kolhi, and fourthly Tharadari Kolhi, who originated in Tharad city, in Gujarat. The kolhi women get a unique tattoo on their arms, neck and face.

== Notable people ==
- Krishna Kumari Kolhi, member of Senate of Pakistan
- Pushpa Kumari Kohli, Pakistani police officer
- Rooplo Kolhi, Freedom Fighter
- Veerji Kolhi, Advocate of High Court Sindh

== See also ==
- List of Koli people
- List of Koli states and clans
