= Talpada Kolis =

Subcaste of Koli caste of Gujarat

Talpada Koli તળપદા કોળી
- Sub-caste of the Koli caste
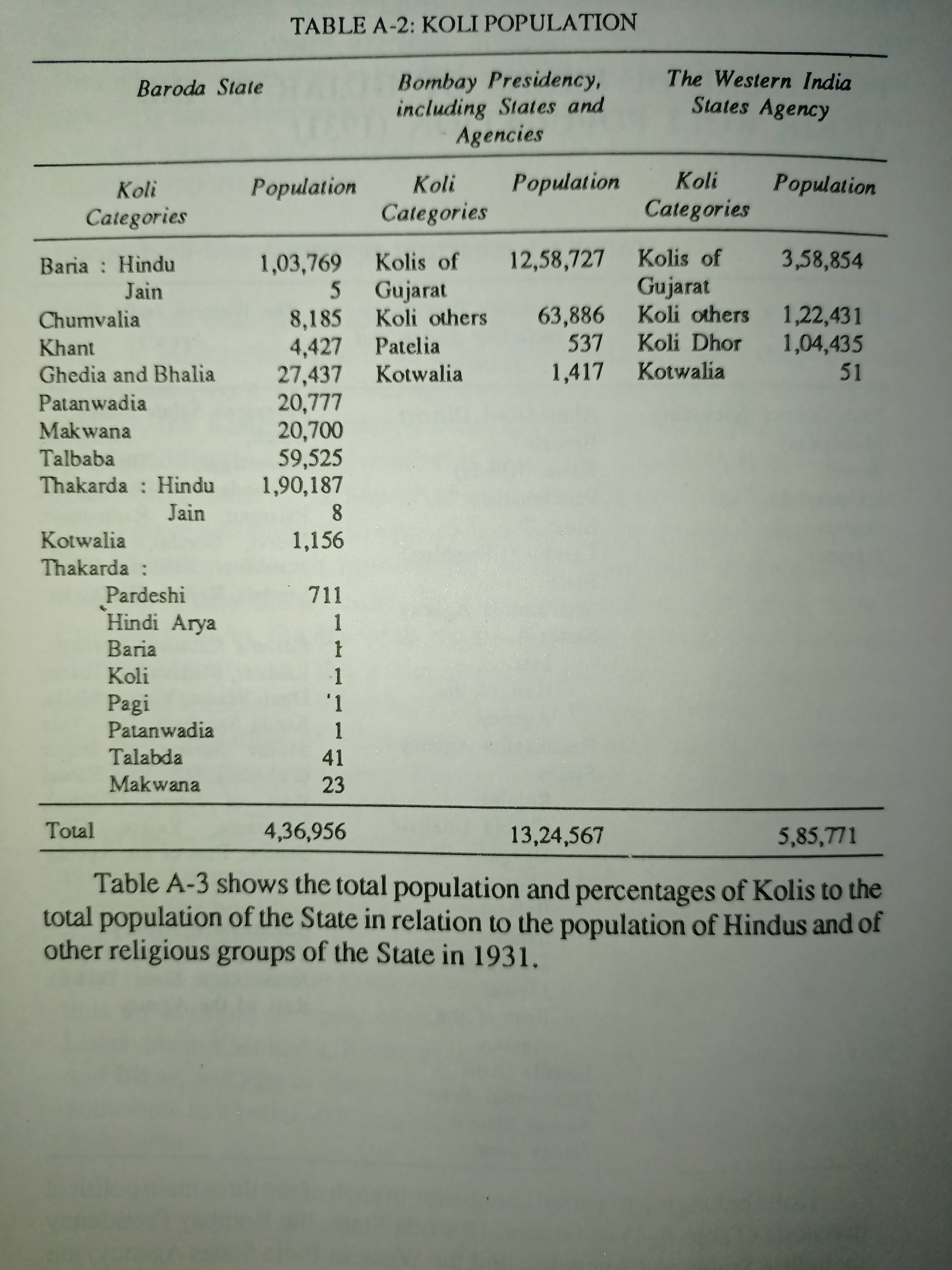
- Koli population in Gujarat in 1931 including Talpada Kolis
- Ethnicity: Koli people
- Location: Gujarat; Dadra and Nagar Haveli and Daman and Diu
- Varna: Agriculturist
- Parent tribe: Kolis of Gujarat
- Population: 59,525 (1931)
- Demonym(s): Gujarati Koli
- Branches: Talapada Koli; Talpada Koli
- Language: Gujarati; Kachi Koli; Parkari Koli; Wadiyara Koli; Hindi; English
- Religion: Hindu
- Surnames: Patel; Kotwal; Pagi

The Talapada Koli, or Talpada Koli, is a subcaste of the Koli caste of Gujarat state in India. Talapada Kolis are agriculturists by profession. they were members of the Gujarat Kshatriya Sabha, an organisation launched by Natwarsinh Solanki who was a Koli elite. In 1907, they were classified by the British as a Criminal Tribe, ascribing to them a range of anti-social activities such as highway robbery, murder, and theft of animals, cattle and standing crops. They were also alleged to be blackmailers and hired assassins.

The Talpada Kolis used the title of Kotwal because of their high position villages and served to rulers as Kotwal and they were granted the villages or large field and title of Pagi because they were good detective for rulers or any chief. Another title of Talapada Kolis is Patel because they are agriculturists and respected cultivators from old days.

== Origin ==
The Talapada Kolis got their name from Talpad region in Junagadh State of Gujarat which they ruled. Talapada Kolis means indigenous Koli used in 19th century. They speak Gujarati language of Gujarat. The Talapada Kolis found in South, Central as well as Peninsular Gujarat.

== History ==
In an unpublished paper on Talpada Kolis in south Gujarat, Arjun Patel mentions that a number of Talpada Kolis had participated in the 1926 non-cooperation movement, in the 1930 Dandi Satyagraha, and the Quit-India movement of 1942. From the Olpad and Choryasi talukas alone 91 Kolis became freedom fighters. Koli leaders here have been active in bringing about social reforms among their folk. Twenty-three caste associations (gnati sangathano) have been recorded in south Gujarat by Patel. The main objectives of these associations are social reform, promotion of education, and furtherance of the economic interests of Kolis. These associations, like the north Gujarat Koli associations, do not avowedly profess any political objective. Patel (1992) notes that many associations in south Gujarat held joint activities. However, the efforts of the south Gujarat Kolis to unite with Kolis of other regions were unsuccessful.

Kambad, a Talpada Koli from Bhavnagar, Saurashtra, in his book (1981:453, in Gujarati), Samast Koli Samaj (All Koli Association), writes that since 1951 meetings were held nearly every year at different places in Saurashtra to bring about a fellow feeling among Kolis and to promote all-round development among them. According to Roy (1983), this association took formal shape on 20 November 1973, under the title Samast Talpada Koli Samaj (All Talpada Koli Society). Its first convention was held at Chotila (Surendranagar district) where about 7000 Kolis from Saurashtra assembled. During this convention the bandharan (constitution) of the association was framed and approved.

== Clans ==
Here are main clans found in Talapada Kolis:

- Dhapa
- Rathod
- Chavda
- Solanki
- Parmar
- Baria
- Mer
- Chauhan
- Makwana
- Bhaliya
- Sankhat
- Jamod

== Titles ==
Talapada Kolis have two titles:

- Patel
- Darbar
- Pagi
- Kotwal
- Dharala

== Organisations ==
- 1974, Shri Talapada Koli Patel Samaj, Surat
- 1961, Shri Talapada Koli Gyati, Bhavnagar
- Dakshin Gujarat Koli Patel Samaj Sangh, Surat
- Bardoli Pradesh Taluka Koli Samaj
- Shri Chikhli Taluka Koli Samaj

== Classification ==
The Talapada Kolis are classified as a Other Backward Class, or OBC caste by Government of Gujarat.
