= Pagi (title) =

Title used by the Koli caste in Gujarat

Pagi પગી
- Title of Koli caste
- Ethnicity: Koli people
- Location: Gujarat
- Varna: Warrior
- Parent tribe: Talpada Koli; Chunvalia Koli; Ghedia Koli
- Demonym(s): Koli
- Language: Gujarati; Koli: Kachi Koli; Parkari Koli; Wadiyara Koli; Hindi; English
- Religion: Hinduism
- Surnames: Kotwal; Thakor

Pagi (also spelled as Paghi and Pugi) is a title used by the Koli caste of the Indian state of Gujarat during the rule of Mughals, Muslims, British, and princely states in British India. They specialised in the tracking of thieves by means of their footprints. Pagi was a title equal to the detective conferred on the Kolis of Talpada and Chunwalia subcastes.

In some cases, Kolis of the Pagi title were treated as of lower status in comparison to those Kolis who were Kotwal, because a small number of Pagi Kolis worked as village watchmen, maintaining order and securing the village at night. Koli Pagis stretched their role as guardsman, police officers and maintain the position in government to use their title proper as Pagi.

The Koli caste is 24% of the total population of Gujarat. They are classified as Other Backward Class (OBC) Kshatriya for their work as Pagi seemed to be a warrior class.

== Clans ==
The Talpada Kolis of Radhvanaj village in Gujarat, whose forefathers were Pagi, adopted the two names as their family clans are Rathod and Solanki.

== Principlities ==
The Kolis who bore the Pagi title ruled over Angadh state as shareholders with kolis of Kotwal title. Angadh was a petty princely state.

== See also ==
- Talpada Kolis
