= Kotwali Thana =

Kotwali Thana can refer to:

- Kotwali Thana, Barishal
- Kotwali Thana, Chittagong
- Kotwali Thana, Cumilla
- Kotwali Thana, Dhaka
- Kotwali Thana, Dinajpur
- Kotwali Thana, Faridpur
- Kotwali Model Thana, Jashore
- Kotwali Thana, Khulna
- Kotwali Thana, Mymensigh
- Kotwali Thana, Rangamati
- Kotwali Thana, Rangpur
- Kotwali Thana, Sylhet

== See also ==
- Kotwal, a military title for porters of forts, later for police officers and magistrates
  - Kotwal (surname), an Indian surname derived from the title
- Kotwali Gate, a gate in Malda, India, on the India–Bangladesh border
- Kotwali Bazar, a suburb in Kangra, Himachal Pradesh, India
- Kotwali Dehat, a town in Uttar Pradesh, India
- Thana (disambiguation)
