= Muslim Kolis =

Muslim Kolis in India

Muslim Koli
- Religious subgroup of Koli caste
- Ethnicity: Koli people
- Location: In India: Gujarat and Maharashtra; In Pakistan: Sindh
- Parent tribe: Hindu Kolis of India
- Branches: Wadha Muslim Koli; Sipahi Muslim Koli; Mahigir Muslim Koli; Makwana Muslim Koli
- Language: Kachi Koli; Gujarati; Marathi; Sindhi; Urdu
- Religion: Islam
- Surnames: Patel

The Muslim Koli, or Musalman Koli is a religious subgroup of the Hindu Koli caste in India and Pakistan. Most of the Muslim Kolis lives in Maharashtra and Gujarat states of India and Sindh province of Pakistan. Muslim Kolis were Hindu by religion but later they converted to Islam.

== Titles ==
Patel, the Muslim Kolis of Gujarat use Patel as their title, like Hindu Kolis.

== Subcastes ==
- The Muslim Kolis of Gujarat are known as Wadha Koli, mostly found in Kutch district of the state.
- The Muslim Kolis of Konkan in Maharashtra are known as Mahigir Muslim Kolis whose forefathers were Hindu Kolis.
- Makwana Muslims of Gujarat are Koli by caste who converted to Islam during the Muslim rule in Gujarat.

== Notable people ==
- Yakut Khan, admiral of Mughal Navy and administrator of Janjira State.

== See also ==
- Koli Christians
- Kolhi
- Patidar
