= Me caste =

Muslim Koli caste in Gujarat and Sindh

Me Koli Vadha Koli
- Subcaste of Muslim Kolis of Gujarat
- Ethnicity: Koli people
- Location: Gujarat; Daman and Diu; Sindh
- Parent tribe: Muslim Kolis
- Demonym: Koli
- Branches: Me Koli; Meta Koli; Vadha Koli; Wadha Koli
- Language: Koli; Gujarati; Hindi; Sindhi; English
- Religion: Hindu; Islam
- Surnames: Patel; Maldhari

The Me Koli also known as Vadha Koli, or Wadha Koli are a partly Muslim Koli and partly Hindu Koli caste found in the former union territory of Daman and Diu and the state of Gujarat in India. They are also known as Maldhari Kolis in the Banni region of Kutch district of Gujarat.

== Clans ==
Here are some of the clans of Me Kolis of Gujarat:

- Makwana
- Khode
- Payri
- Yoyi
- Notada
- Chandri
- Mattani
- Aspan

== Titles ==
- Patel, the most common title is Patel used by Me Kolis of Gujarat.
- Maldhari, Me Kolis of Kutch also titled as Maldhari for their traditional profession of animal husbandry.
