= Chunvalia Koli =

Subcaste of Koli caste

Chunvalia Koli ચુંવાલિયા કોલી
- Subcaste of Koli caste
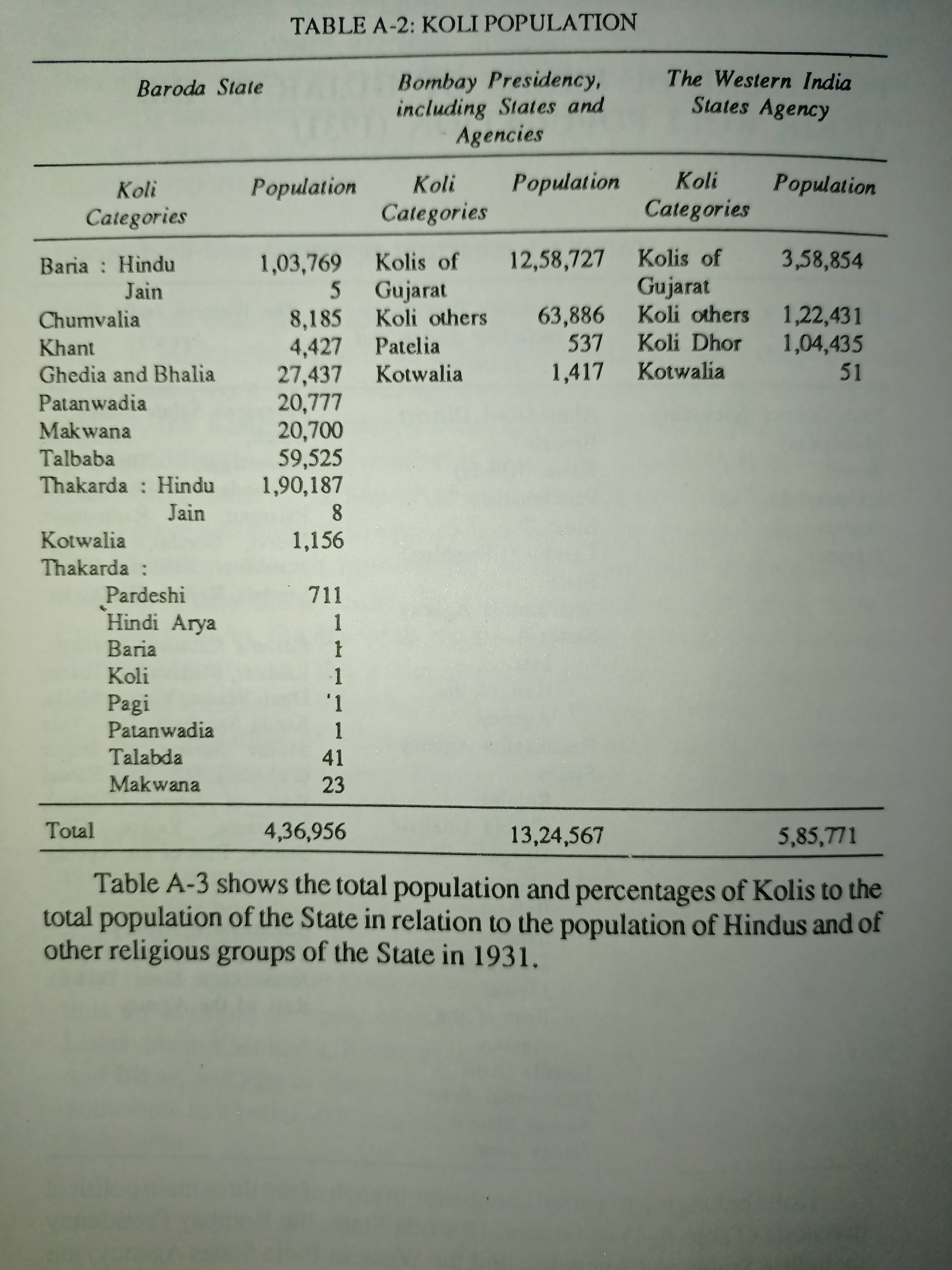
- Koli population in 1931 including Chunvalia Kolis of Bombay Presidency
- Location: Gujarat; Daman and Diu
- Parent caste: Koli people
- Population: 8,185 In Baroda State in the census of 1931
- Demonyms: Chunvalia Koli (also rendered: Chunvaliya; Chunwalia; Chunwaliya; Chuvalia; Chuvaliya; Chuwalia; Chuwaliya)
- Language: Wadiyara Koli language, other Koli languages; Gujarati; Hindi; English
- Religion: Hinduism (majority); Islam (minority)
- Surnames: (or titles): Thakor; Pagi; Kotwal; Darbar

The Chunvalia, or Chuvalia, Chunwalia is a subcaste of the Koli caste, found in the Indian state of Gujarat. The Chunvalia Kolis were the first Indian caste to adopt the game of cricket in India. Chunvalia Kolis were classified as a Criminal Tribe under Criminal Tribes Act by the British Raj because of their purported anti-social behaviour and activities, such as alleged dacoity in Gujarat. During the First World War, Chunwalia Kolis were enlisted as soldiers in British Indian Army by the Bombay government of British India.

== Origin ==
Traditionally, Chunvalia Kolis are said to be from the forty-four villages (Chunvalis) of Chunval Pradesh of Gujarat, which was ruled by Makwana Koli landlords. Their name is believed to have arisen from this possible origin. Chunvalia Kolis are mostly found in the Saurashtra region of Gujarat.

== History ==
=== Raiding ===
During the reign of Gujarat Sultanate, the Chunvalia Kolis, under their chief or petty ruler, were viewed as "the most turbulent caste" and plundered the villages inhabited by Muslims. They killed the Viceroy of the Sultanate, so Sahib Khan was appointed as viceroy. Azam Khan displaced him because the depredations of Kolis had become frequent during the weak rule of the viceroy Sahib Khan. At this time Shaista Khan marched against and defeated the Chunwalia Kolis, who, since Azam Khan's time, had been ravaging the villages round Ahmadabad as well as those of Dholka, Kadi and Viramgam.

=== Unrest under the Raj ===
The Chunvalia Kolis were agriculturists. In the 19th century, as their land holdings and access to livelihoods decreased, they troubled the British Raj; it viewed their activities as antisocial. The Chunvalia Kolis were labeled an outlaw caste of Gujarat. The government of the Bombay Presidency sent British Indian Army troops to suppress the Chunvalia Kolis; the Chunvalia Kolis resisted these troops.

In 1814, there was general unrest in Gogha between the superior and inferior landowners owing to an unequal value of land revenue assessment and the arrogant attitude of land proprietors. As a result, an unceasing struggle was going on between them. So Chuvalia Koli chiefs attacked and plundered the villages and created a disturbance in territories under the control of the British Raj. They again revolted in the northeast of Ahmedabad district in 1819, 1824 and 1825. The British colonial authorities sent troops to suppress the Koli revolt, and the Koli jagirdars were forced to give securities to villagers. Chuvalia Kolis also made disorder in the Daskroi Taluka, Viramgam and Prantij before they were once again suppressed.

In the early 20th century, in Baroda State, Chunvalia Kolis were primarily found in the Kadi district. Fifty years earlier, they were looked upon as "the terror of North Gujarat", according to colonial-era ethnographers. These accounts relate how, led by their chiefs, Thakardas or Girasias, they lived in villages protected by impassable thorn fences from where they levied contributions from the surrounding districts.

== Occupations and classification ==
The Chunvalia Kolis, in common with the Koli people as a whole, were once considered a "criminal caste" prone to dacoity, as designated by Raj authorities, for purportedly engaging in such crimes as highway and gang robberies, theft of livestock and crops, murder and blackmail. Such designations, categorising entire social groups as the Raj authorities did, resulted from the scientific racism of the day, with its related erroneous theories of biological determinism, along with political considerations of colonial rule. Since the turn of the twentieth century, Chunvalia Kolis have mainly been engaged in cultivation and other agrarian activities. They were traditionally considered skilled salt makers, a craft in which the whole family would be employed.

The Government of Gujarat classified the caste of the Chunvalia Kolis as Other Backward Class (OBC). They are traditionally non-vegetarian.

== Titles ==
A number of titles are used by Chunvalia Kolis of Gujarat. These include:

- Thakor, used by Chunvalia Kolis who ruled over any principalities or were chiefs of villages or rich and high Koli families.
- Pagi, used by Chunvalia Kolis who served as a detectives for rulers or any chief.
- Girasia, used by Chunvalia Kolis, amongst others, who ruled or controlled a land grant or jagir, granted to them by a ruler or chief.
