= Koli Christians =

Subgroup of the Koli caste in Konkan division of Maharashtra

- ईसाई कोळी
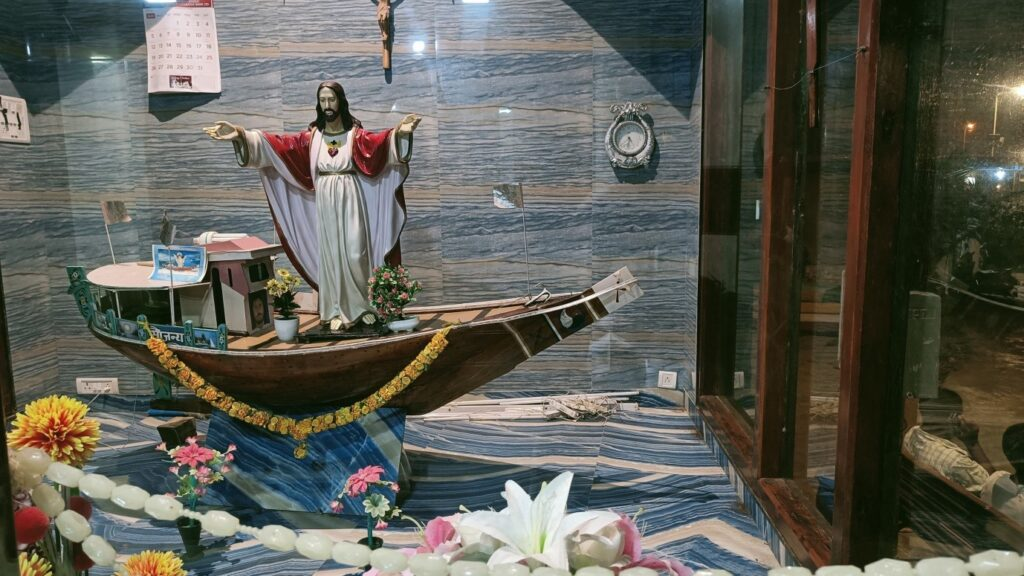
- Chapel of Jesus, Worli Koliwada, Mumbai, Maharashtra, India, Christian Kolis
- Classification: Koli people
- Kuladevta (male): Sacred Name of Jesus Christ
- Kuladevi (female): Mount St Mary
- Nishan: Christian cross
- Religions: Christianity
- Languages: Bombay East Indian dialect; Konkani; Koli: Kachi Koli; Parkari Koli; Wadiyara Koli; English; Hindi-Urdu (Bombay Hindi); Damaon and Dio Portuguese creole
- Country: India
- Original state: Maharashtra; Goa; Gujarat; Damaon
- Ethnicity: Marathi-Konkani
- Population: 9000 (1989)
- Feudal title: Patil; Gaonpatil
- Related groups: Goan Christians, Mangalorean Christians and Karwari Christians
- Status: Endangered
- Kingdom (original): Portuguese Bombay, Colaba state etc.

Koli Christians are Koli people who profess Christianity in India, they are part of the Koli caste of Bombay East Indians, who are the indigenous ethnic people of the Seven Islands of Bombay, the Bombay metropolitan area and the northern Konkan region; in which lies the city of Mumbai (Bombay). The Koli Christians continue to hold on to some of their Koli customs and values as the part of Koli caste, in spite of their conversions from Brahmanism to Christianity and in the former Bom Bahia of Portuguese India. Christian Kolis are also known as Thankar and Gaonkar Kolis; they played an important role in building churches and convents in the northern Konkan division of present-day Maharashtra.

== Culture and custom ==
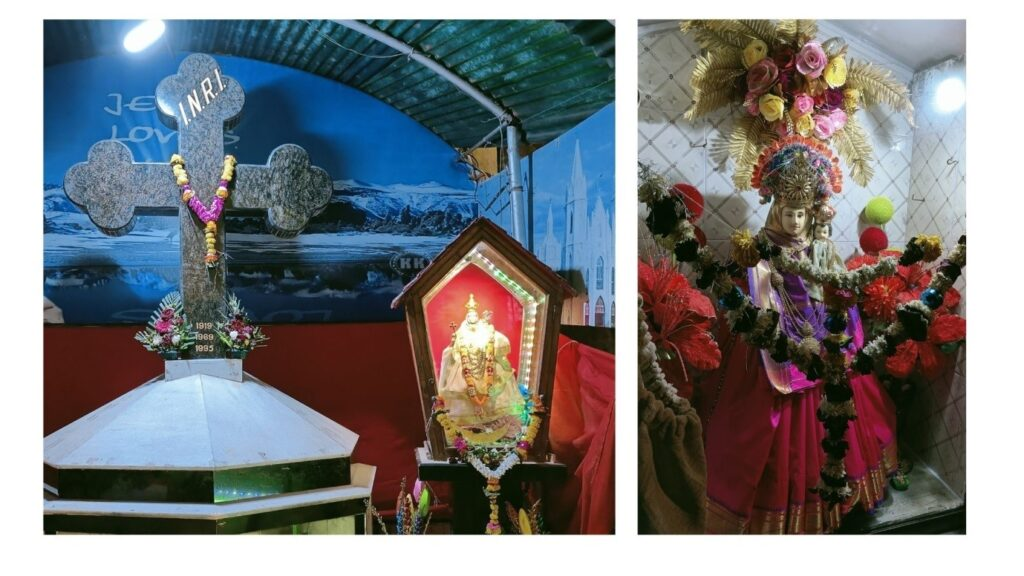
Cross and Mother Mary (in Koli saree), in Worli Koliwada, Christian Koli's temple of Mumbai

In 1989, there were approximately 9,000 Koli Christians, most of whom were fishermen, like their Hindu counterparts. Koli Christians blend the customs and traditions of the Koli people with the beliefs of the Catholic Church. In accordance with Koli tradition, marriages among Koli Christians are typically arranged, and certain ceremonies are observed in common with Hindu Kolis, such as the Shakarpura (engagement ceremony), while Christian practices are also observed, including the conducting of the wedding in a church. Although cross cousin and first cousin marriage has been generally practiced among the Hindu Maharashtri Kolis, the Bombay East Indian Koli Christians are forbidden through catechism (instructions) on the Sacrament of Matrimony.

Most Koli Christians live in Koliwadas, where their social lives are overseen by a patil and his karbaris (councillors). Holding their position by right of inheritance, these people are collectively known as the jamat. The bulk of Koli Christians fish for a living, with their catches being taken to market in Mumbai by fishwives or agents.

== Conversion ==
The Kolis of the Konkan division in Maharashtra converted to Christianity during the Portuguese Indian era, and they proved very helpful during the wartime because they were experts in boat and warships building.

== Titles ==
- Patil: Christian Kolis who were landlords, nobles or men of influence bore the title of Patil. These were responsible for maintaining the religious practices and order in community of Koli Christians.
- Gaonpatil: The Gaonpatil is a common title among Christian Kolis who are responsible for maintaining religious activities and caste practices.

== Distribution ==
Christian Kolis are mostly found in the Mumbai , Colaba, Worli, Chimvai (Bandra), BunderPakhadi, Madh, Uttan, Gorai, Bassein (Vasai) & Aghasi (Agacaim) in Maharashtra. In Gorai, 85% population are Christian Kolis.

== Beliefs ==
Some Christian Kolis worship both Hindu idols and the Christian God. Christian Kolis also venerate the Hindu Koli goddess Ekvira in the Karla Caves and the deity Bhairava in Jejuri. Christian Kolis dress up statues of St Mary in their ethnic Koli saris.

== Classification ==
The Koli Christians of Maharashtra are classified as Other Backward Class (OBC) by the National Commission for Backward Classes and the Government of Maharashtra and Government of Goa.

== See also ==
- List of Koli people
- List of Koli states and clans
- Christian Brahmins
- Christian Cxatrias
- Religion in India
