= Aer language =

Indo-Aryan language spoken in Pakistan

Aer
- آیر
- Region: Sindh, Pakistan
- Native speakers: (100 cited 1998)
- Language family: Indo-European: Indo-Iranian; Indo-Aryan; Western Indo-Aryan; Gujarati; Aer
- Dialects: Jikrio Goth; Jamesabad
- Writing system: Arabic script

Language codes
- ISO 639-3: aeq
- Glottolog: aerr1238
- ELP: Aer

Aer (/ˈaɪər/ YRE) is an Indo-Aryan language spoken by around 100 people in Sindh, Pakistan and Gujarat, India. It is one of the smallest languages of Pakistan in terms of number of speakers, and is spoken in rural areas of Sindh including Hyderabad, Kot Ghulam Muhammad, and Kunri. Some speakers are also reported to be living in Shaheed Benazirabad, but they have a different culture.

== History ==
After the Partition of India in 1947, the Muslim speakers of the language migrated to Pakistan, while the Hindu speakers stayed in India. Most of the Aer speakers in Pakistan live in Deh 333, near Hyderabad in lower Sindh. The language was formed in the Indian subcontinent during the Delhi Sultanate and Mughal Empire due to the influence of Persian, Arabic, and Turkish on Indian languages.

A 1998 estimate concluded there were around 200 native speakers. Current estimates, however, put the number of speakers at 150, further cementing its 'endangered' status.

== Classification ==
Aer has been classified as one of the Gujarati languages. Ethnologue reports that the closest language is Kachi Koli and especially its dialects Katai Meghwar and Kachi Bhil, and that most Aer speakers are bilingual in Sindhi. Two varieties of Aer are Jikrio Goth Aer and Jamesabad Aer.

== Alphabet ==
Aer is commonly not written, but when it is, it is written in a variety of the Arabic script.

Aer Perso-Arabic alphabet
Letter	Name of Letter	Transcription	IPA
ا	alif	a	/a/
ب	be	b	/b/
پ	pe	p	/p/
ت	te	t	/t/
ٹ	ṭe	ṭ	/ʈ/
ث	se	(s)	/s/
ج	jīm	j	/d͡ʒ/
چ	če	č	/t͡ʃ/
ح	he	(h)	/h/
خ	khe	kh	/kʰ/
د	dāl	d	/d/
ڈ	ḍāl	ḍ	/ɖ/
ۮ	đāl	đ	/ɗ/
ذ	zāl	(z)	/z/
ر	re	r	/ɾ/
ڑ	ṛe	ṛ	/ɽ/
ۯ	ḷe	ḷ	/ɭ/
ز	ze	z	/z/
ژ	že	ž	/ʒ/
س	sīn	s	/s/
ش	šīn	š	/ʃ/
ص	swād	(s)	/s/
ض	zwād	(z)	/z/
ط	to'e	(t)	/t/
ظ	zo'e	(z)	/z/
ع	‘ayn	ʿ	/ʔ/
غ	ghayn	gh	/ɡʱ/
ف	fe	f	/f/
ق	qāf	q	/q/
ک	kāf	k	/k/
گ	gāf	g	/ɡ/
ل	lām	l	/l/
م	mīm	m	/m/
ن	nūn	n	/n/
ݨ	ṇūn	ṇ	/ɳ/
ں	˜	˜	/˜/
و	waw	w	/w/
ہ	he	h	/h/
ھ	_he	_h	/ʰ/, /ʱ/
ۿ	ḫ	ḫ	/ɦ/
ء	hamza	ʿ	/ʔ/
ی	ye	y	/j/, /i/
ے	ye	e, ē	/ɛ/
