= Chavda (Koli clan) =

Clan of Koli caste in Gujarat

Chavda Koli ચાવડા કોળી
- Clan (gotra) of Koli caste
- Ethnicity: Koli
- Location: Gujarat; Daman and Diu
- Varna: Kshatriya
- Parent tribe: Koli Hindu
- Language: Gujarati; Koli
- Religion: Hindu

The Chavda Koli (also spelled as Chavada Koli, Chawada Koli or Chawda Koli) is a clan of Hindu Koli community living in the Indian state of Gujarat and union territory of Daman and Diu.

== Distribution ==
Chavda Koli families are mostly found in Gujarat, Kathiawar region and even in some regions of Maharashtra. They are stretched out in the eastern and northern regions of Gujarat bordering Maharashtra along with other locally known Koli clans.
