= VGR =

VGR may refer to:

- Star Trek: Voyager, a science fiction television series
- Vaghri language, an Indic language of Pakistan
- Vale of Glamorgan Railway, a Welsh railway preservation society
- Victorian Goldfields Railway, a heritage railway in Victoria, Australia
- Voyager 1, VGR the three-letter call sign for NASA's Voyager mission in morse code
