= JND =

JND or jnd may refer to:

- Just-noticeable difference, the amount something must be changed in order for a difference to be noticeable
- John Nelson Darby, a British theologian and translator of various Bible translations such as the DBY
- JND, the station code for Junagadh Junction railway station, Gujarat, India
- jnd, the ISO 639-3 code for Jandavra language, Pakistan and India
