= Gujarati languages =

Western Indo-Aryan language family

- Geographic distribution: Gujarat, Rajasthan, Sindh, Maharashtra, South India
- Linguistic classification: Indo-European: Indo-Iranian; Indo-Aryan; Western; Gujarati languages

Language codes
- Glottolog: guja1256

The Gujarati languages are a Western Indo-Aryan language family, comprising Gujarati and those Indic languages closest to it. They are ultimately descended from Shauraseni Prakrit. It is the official language of Gujarat state as well as Diu, Daman and Dadra and Nagar Haveli. Gujarati is the sixth most spoken language in India with more than 55 million speakers.

Numerous Gujarati languages are transitional between Gujarati and Sindhi. The precise relationship, if any exists, between Vaghri, the Bhil languages, Wagdi, Rajasthani, and Bagri, has not been presently elucidated.

Language (Note: Includes variants and dialects)	Speakers	Region(s)
Aer	100	Sindh
Gujarati	46,857,670	Gujarat
Jandavra	5,000	Sindh and Jodhpur
Kachi / Koli Kachi	500,000	Kutch and Sindh
Lisan ud-Dawat	8,000	Gujarat and Northeast Africa
Parkari / Koli Parkari	275,000	Sindh
Wadiyara / Koli Wadiyara	542,000	Gujarat and Jodhpur
Saurashtra	2,000,000	Tamil Nadu, Andhra Pradesh and Karnataka
Vaghri	3,660	Sindh
Vasavi	1,200,000	South Gujarat and Khandesh
