= Vaghri people =

Tribe and caste of India

Vaghari
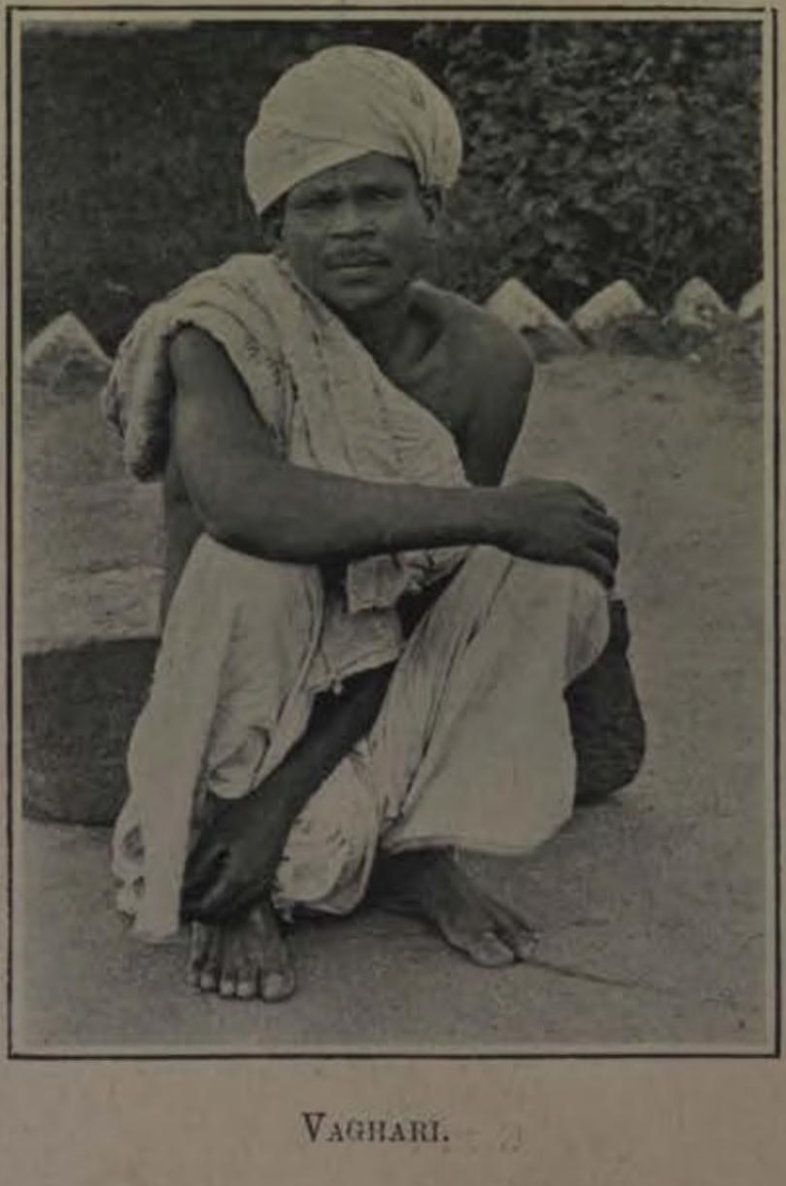
- A photograph of a Vaghari man, 1911

Regions with significant populations
- India: 566,000
- Pakistan: 43,000

Languages
- Vaghri, Gujarati, Sindhi, Rajasthani languages

Religion
- Hinduism; Islam

Related ethnic groups
- Gujarati people, Rajasthani people, Indo-Aryan peoples

The Vaghari (Vaghri, Waghri or Baghri) (Gujarati: Vāgharī, Bāgharī) are a tribe found in the states of Rajasthan and Gujarat in India, and in the province of Sindh in Pakistan.

During the British Raj, the Vagri were listed under the Criminal Tribes Act of 1871 as a tribe "addicted to the systematic commission of non-bailable offences." In 1952, they were "denotified", meaning that they were no longer listed as criminals.

== Present circumstances ==
=== In India ===
In India, the Waghri are mainly located in the Gujarat District. Like many other Gujarati Hindu communities, they are endogamous but maintain gotra exogamy. Their main clans are the Devipujak, Dantani, Badgujar, Vaghela, Solanki, Kharwa, Godara, etc. They were landless community in the British Raj but now many are well settled, well educated and participating in the growth of the country India. They have an effective caste council, which acts as a quasi-judicial body and deals with intra-community disputes. They are a Hindu community, with their main tribal deities being Bahuchara Mata, Charbayu Mata (Chandika Mata), Shitla Mata, Hadak Mata, Khodiyar Mata, Mogal Mata, and Meldi Mata. Also, follow Pavani (Maa Kali), Mata Shakti, Runvali Mata (Devi of desert), Bhutdi Maa.

In Gujarat, the Waghri are found mainly in the districts of Sabarkantha, Banaskantha, Panchmahal, Kheda, and Ahmedabad. They speak Gujarati language among themselves and normal language with outsiders.

=== In Pakistan ===
The Vagri in Pakistan are found mainly in the districts of Umerkot and Tharparkar. They are landless, and have been subject to discrimination at the hands of the locally powerful Sodha Rajput community.

A recent study showed that the majority of scheduled caste population of Pakistan, which includes the Vagri, are practically landless. The survey conducted showed that in Tharparkar, Umerkot, Rahim Yar Khan, and Bahawalpur districts revealed that an overwhelming majority of 83 per cent Scheduled Caste population did not own even a small piece of land. The land ownership by the remaining 17 per cent is also very small as 90 per cent of the Scheduled Caste land owners have a very small piece of land between one and five acres. Like those in India, the Pakistan Vagri are Hindu, and speak both Sindhi and their own language, Bagri, which is distantly related to Rajasthani.
