= Kotwali Dehat =

Kotwali
- town
- Location within Uttar Pradesh Location within India
- Coordinates: 29°25′51″N 78°21′25″E
- Country: India
- District: Bijnor
- Established: 1790; 236 years ago
- Founder: sher e kotwal

Government
  - Type: Gram Panchayat Pradhan
  - Body: Gram panchayat

Area
  - Total: 12,000 ha (30,000 acres)

Population (2011)
  - Total: 15,300
  - Density: 130/km^{2} (330/sq mi)

Languages
  - Official: Hindi, Urdu
- Time zone: UTC+5:30 (IST)
- Postal code: 246764
- Vehicle registration: UP 20
- clean kotwali sundar kotwali

Kotwali Dehat is a large block and village in the Bijnor district and Tehsil Nagina of the Indian state of Uttar Pradesh.

It is 7 kilometers from Nagina, 23 kilometers from Najibabad, 25 kilometers from Dhampur, and 8 kilometers from Nehtour.

== Members ==
Gram Panchayat -(KOTWAALI) : Members
S.N	Name	Designation
1	Ahmad Gaffar	Gram Panchayat Member
2	Hanif	Gram Panchayat Member
3	Hasan Fatma	Gram Panchayat Member
4	Intjar Ahmad	Gram Panchayat Member
5	Keval Ram	Gram Panchayat Member
6	Mamta	Gram Panchayat Member
7	Mohd Khalid	Gram Panchayat Member
8	Mohd Shahid	Gram Panchayat Member
9	Nasrin	Gram Panchayat Member
10	Rais Ahmad	Gram Panchayat Member
11	Shakil Ahmad	Gram Panchayat Member
12	Mehboob Alam	Gram Panchayat Member
13	Mohd Usman	Gram Panchayat Member
14	Shamshida	Gram Panchayat Member

== Wards ==
Gram Panchayat - (KOTWAALI) : Wards
No.	Ward Name	Ward No	LGD Code
1	Ward No.1	ward no.1	2432534
2	Ward No.2	ward no.2	2432535
3	Ward No.3	ward no.3	2432536
4	Ward No.4	ward no.4	2432537
5	Ward No.5	ward no.5	2432538
6	Ward No.6	ward no.6	2432539
7	Ward No.7	ward no.7	2432540
8	Ward No.8	ward no.8	2432541
9	Ward No.9	ward no.9	2432542
10	Ward No.10	ward no.10	2432543
11	Ward No.11	ward no.11	2432544
12	Ward No.12	ward no.12	2432545
13	Ward No.13	ward no.13	2432546
14	Ward No.14	ward no.14	2432547
15	Ward No.15	ward no.15	2432548

== Gram Panchyat List of Kotwali block ==
Gram Panchayat List of Kotwali
S.N	Village Panchayat Name	LGD Code
1	Aalealipur	55199
2	Abdipurherbansh	55200
3	Abdulfazalpurbani	55201
4	Abdullapurkureshi	55202
5	Ajupurarani	55203
6	Alauddinpur	270233
7	Alhedadpur{khajva}	55204
8	Alipura Ganga	270204
9	Alipurajat	55205
10	Alipurmaan	55206
11	Allahahedi	270244
12	Aslampur Bhullan	270297
13	Aurangabad	270303
14	Azampur Parma	270240
15	Babansaray	55207
16	Badhala	55208
17	Bedarbakpurjado	55209
18	Begampur Chaymal	55213
19	Begampurhare	55210
20	Benipur	55211
21	Bhagwanpur	55212
22	Bhogli	55214
23	Bhogpur	55215
24	Binjahedi	55216
25	Budhabala	55217
26	Chakudaychand (FATAHPUR AHATMALI)	55218
27	Chandupura	270210
28	Fatahpur	55219
29	Fazalpur Bhau	270288
30	Garabpur	270213
31	Ghansurpur Amroli	270216
32	Gopiwala	55220
33	Goshpursadat	55221
34	Hajimohd.purkot	55222
35	Haqikatpurgangwali	55223
36	Haqikatpursashu	55224
37	Hargabchadan	55225
38	Harganpur	55226
39	Hasanalipur Dharma	270296
40	Hasanalipur Heera	270168
41	Herbanshpurdhrak	55227
42	Huseinabad	55228
43	Inayatpur	55229
44	Ishahilpurdami	55230
45	Ishlamabad	55231
46	Jafarpur	55232
47	Jaganathpur Mehru	270289
48	Jaggannathpur	55233
49	Jahanabad	55234
50	Jahangeerpurkhash	55235
51	Jamalpur Banger	55236
52	Jamalpur Matlub	270203
53	Jamalpurdeekli	55237
54	Jhilmila	55239
55	Kakarpur	270186
56	Kalakhedi	55238
57	Kalyanpur	55240
58	Kamaalpurbhoga	55241
59	Kamruddin Nagar	270309
60	Kanakpur	55243
61	Kandarwala	270308
62	Karondachohder	55242
63	Karondapachdu	55244
64	Kashbakotra	55245
65	Kayamnagerdodrajpur	55246
66	Kazipuraimma	55247
67	Khanpurmanak	55249
68	Kharullapur	55250
69	Khijarpurjaggu	55251
70	Khurampurdallu	55252
71	Khurampurkhadak	55253
72	Khushalpurdewansingh	55254
73	Khushalpurmatheri	55255
74	Kiratpur	55256
75	Kirtonagli	55257
76	Kishanpurkunda	55258
77	Kotwaali	55259
78	Kunjeta	55260
79	Ladpur	270245
80	Madpurasultaan	55261
81	Maheshpur	55262
82	Maheshwerijat	55264
83	Mahmudpurnarayan	55263
84	Majhedashakru	55265
85	Makandpur Rajmal	270250
86	Malakpur Dehri	270207
87	Malakpurabdulla	55266
88	Manabberpursaid	55267
89	Masuri	55268
90	Maujampur Dayal	270180
91	Mehmudpurbhawata	55269
92	Mirza Alipur Bhara	270185
93	Mitthepur	270217
94	Mo.purtirlok	55270
95	Modh.asiqpurbhure	55271
96	Mohd.purherbansh	55272
97	Mohideenpur	55273
98	Murtjapur	55274
99	Mushtfapurbhurapur	55275
100	Mussypur	245665
101	Narullapur	55276
102	Nenpura	55277
103	Nijampurdevsi	55278
104	Nuralipurbhagwat	55279
105	Nurpurarab	55280
106	Pakhanpur	55281
107	Pitanhedi	55282
108	Puraeni	55283
109	Raipuri Garhi	270234
110	Rajopursadat	55284
111	Rajpura	55285
112	Ramjiwala	270276
113	Rampurchajmal	55286
114	Rampurdas	55287
115	Rasulpurjagan	55288
116	Rasulpurmujafer1	55289
117	Rathupura	270242
118	Rawal Hedi Khajuri	55248
119	Raypursadat	55290
120	Roshanpurpratap	55291
121	Sabuwala	270301
122	Sadatpurgadi	55292
123	Saidpura Gajju	245631
124	Samaspurnaseeb	55293
125	Samaspursaddo	55294
126	Sarai Dadumber	55298
127	Sardarpur	270278
128	Sedkhedi	55295
129	Sedpurimahichand	55296
130	Shadipur	55297
131	Shahalipur Asha	270176
132	Shahmujaffarpur	55299
133	Shahwazpur	270169
134	Shalipurkotra	55300
135	Sharfudeennagar	55301
136	Sharifpur Malakpur	270239
137	Shaubalagosibala	55302
138	Shekhpuraturk	55303
139	Shernagarnareni	55304
140	Sikkawala	270235
141	Su.aa.purbaniganesh	55305
142	Sulemanpurshikohpur	55306
143	Takipur Narottam	270182
144	Tandamaidas	55307
145	Tarapur	55308
146	Telipara	270298
147	Tukhmapurherbansh	55309
148	Ugersanpur	55310
149	Umarpur Barkhera	270282

Religions in Kotwali (2011)
Religion	Percent
Hindus	38%
Muslims	62%
