= Vaghri language =

Indic language of Pakistan

Vaghri
- Native to: Pakistan
- Region: Sindh
- Ethnicity: Vagri
- Native speakers: 4,800 (2018)
- Language family: Indo-European: Indo-Iranian; Indo-Aryan; Western Indo-Aryan; Gujarati; Vaghri

Language codes
- ISO 639-3: vgr
- Glottolog: vagh1246

Vaghri (Bavri) is an Indo Aryan language of Pakistan spoken by the Vagri. It is closely related to Gujarati.

== Phonology ==
Consonants
		Bilabial	Dental	Retroflex	Palatal	Velar	Glottal
Plosive	voiceless	p	t	ʈ	c	k	
Plosive	aspirated	pʰ	tʰ	ʈʰ	cʰ	kʰ	
Plosive	voiced	b	d	ɖ	ɟ	ɡ	
Plosive	breathy	bʱ	dʱ	ɖʱ	ɟʱ	ɡʱ	
Fricative			s				h
Nasal		m	n	ɳ		ŋ	
Tap			r	ɽ			
Approximant		w	l		j		

/ŋ/, /ɽ/, and /ɳ/ do not occur word-initially.

Vowels
	Front	Near-front	Central	Back	
	Front	Near-front	Central	unrounded	rounded
Close	i			ɯ	u
Close-mid	e	ɪ	ə		
Open-mid	ɛ		ə	ʌ	ɔ
Open				ɑ	ɒ

All vowels except /e/ and /ɔ/ can be nasalized. There are four 'true' diphthongs, these being /ɔɑ/, /ɑi/, /ɑu/, and /ɑɯ/.

The majority of monosyllabic words are CVC. Every word has at least one accented syllable.

== Morphology ==
Vaghri distinguishes two noun classes: masculine and feminine. Neuter Indo-Aryan nouns are mostly classed masculine. Nouns ending in /-ɒ/ generally belong to the masculine class. Nouns ending in /-i/ are generally feminine.

Nouns in Vaghri are inflected for two numbers: singular and plural.

Plural inflection
Masculine	Feminine	Plural
/-ɒ/	/-i/	/-ũ/
/-C/		/-Cũ/
/-a/		/-aũ/ (optional)

Masculine nouns can be inflected for additional cases:

Case endings for masculine nouns ending in -ɒ
Case	Singular	Plural
Nominative	/-ɒ/	/-ē/
Direct Object	/-ɒ/	/-ɛ/
Oblique	/-ɛ/	/-̃ɛ̃/
Vocative	/-ɒ̄/	/-ɒ̄/ or /-ɒū/

All other nouns
Case	Singular	Plural
Nominative	/-∅/	/-ũ/
Direct Object	/-∅/	/-ũ/
Oblique	/-∅/	/-ũ/
Vocative	/-∅/	/-ɛ̃/

Adjectives are inflected for noun class. There is no comparative affix, but the word wad^{h}u can be used to indicate the comparative.

Vaghri pronouns inflect for case and number.

Personal pronouns
Person	Case	Singular	Plural
1st person	Nom.	ā̃ũ	asĩ
1st person	Obj.	mũ	asā̃
1st person	Obl.	mũ	asā̃
2nd person	Nom.	tũ	ā̃i
2nd person	Obj.	to	ā̃i
2nd person	Obl.	to	āi
3rd person	Nom.	u	u
3rd person	Obj.	un	uni
3rd person	Obl.	un	uni

Vaghri verbs, like other Indo-Aryan verbs, consist of three parts: A root, an affix, and a personal suffix. Passive voice is formed by adding -ā to the stem.

== Vocabulary ==
Cardinal numerals
Number	Gloss	Vaghri	Gujarati
1	one	hekɽɒ	ek
2	two	bɒ	be
3	three	trɛ	tran̩
4	four	cār	cār
5	five	penjn	pānc
6	six	c^{h}ɒ	c^{h}a
7	seven	satt	sāt
8	eight	aʈʈ^{h}	ˈɑʈʰ
9	nine	nũ	nav
10	ten	ɖɒ	das
11	eleven	agiyārɒ	əɡijɑɾ
20	twenty	with	vīs
30	thirty	trih	trīs
40	forty	c^{h}āri	cāḷīs
50	fifty	panj^{h}a	pacās
60	sixty	satʈ^{h}	sāʈ^{h}a
70	seventy	santɛr	sittēra
80	eighty	ɛsi	ɛ̃si
90	ninety	nevũ	nevu
100	one hundred	sɒ	sō

ɒrdinal numerals are as follows:

Number	Gloss	Vaghri masc.	Gujarati masc.	Vaghri fem.	Gujarati fem.
1st	first	pɛhrɒ	pahelo	pɛhri	pahli
2nd	second	byo	bijo	bai	baji
3rd	third	tryo	trijo	trai	triji
4th	fourth	cot^{h}o	cot^{h}o	cot^{h}i	cot^{h}i
5th	fifth	panj^{h}mũ	pānomũ	panj^{h}mi	pānemi
6th	sixth	c^{h}aʈʈ^{h}o	c^{h}aʈʈ^{h}o	c^{h}aʈʈ^{h}i	c^{h}aʈʈ^{h}i
7th	seventh	sattmũ	sātmɒ	sattmi	sātmi
8th	eighth	aʈʈ^{h}mũ	āʈʈ^{h}mɒ	aʈʈ^{h}mi	āʈʈ^{h}mi
9th	ninth	numũ	navmɒ	nũmi	navmi
10th	tenth	ɖɒmũ	dasmɒ	dɒmi	dasmi
