= Ashutosh Kotwal =

American-Indian physicist (born 1965)

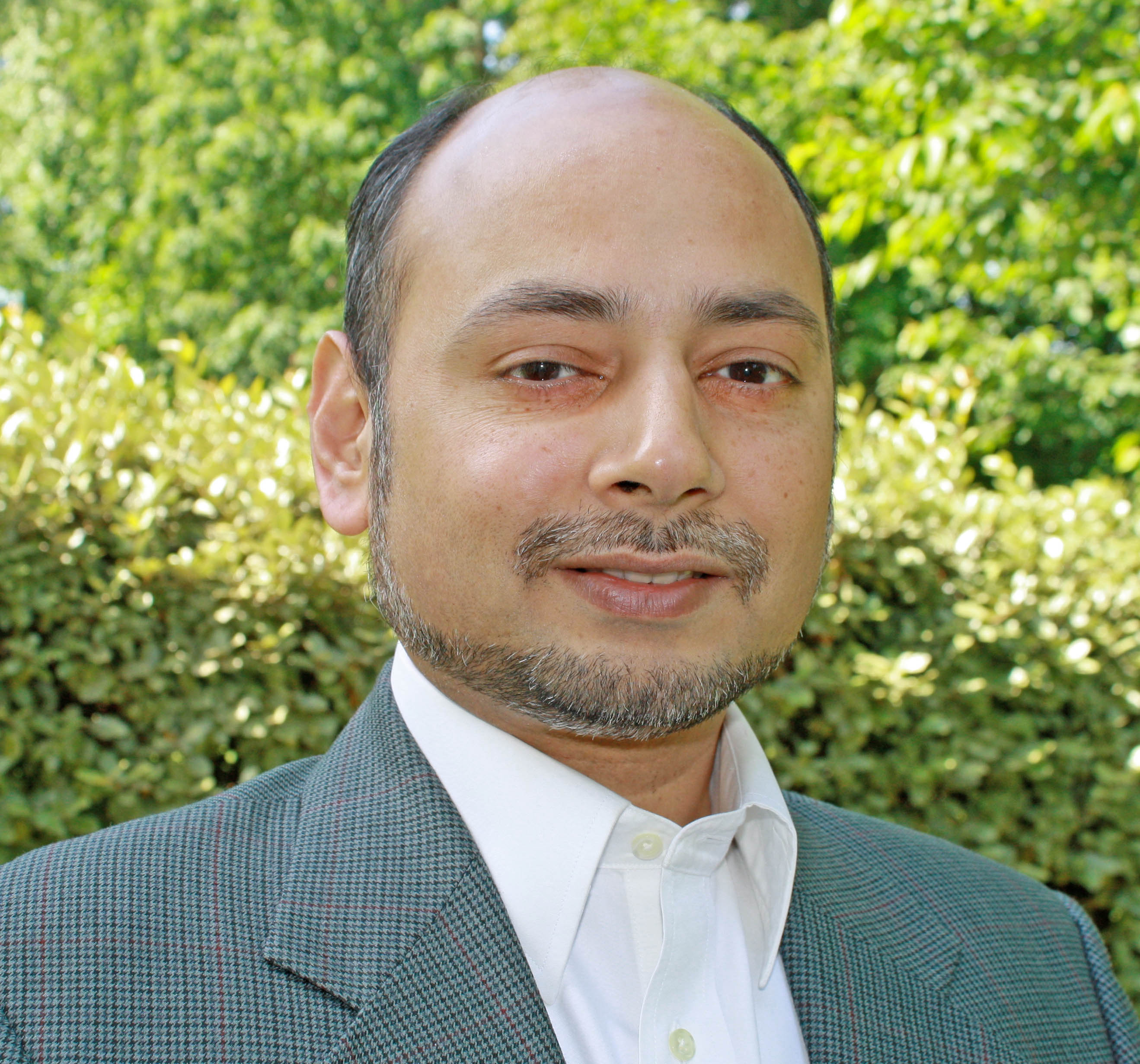
- Ashutosh Kotwal
- Born: December 20, 1965 (age 60); Mumbai, India
- Occupation: Particle physicist

Ashutosh Vijay Kotwal (born December 20, 1965) is an American particle physicist of Indian origin. He is the Fritz London Professor of Physics at Duke University, and conducts research in particle physics related to W bosons and the Higgs boson and searches for new particles and forces.

== Early life ==
Kotwal was born in Mumbai, India, and attended schools in Calcutta, Lucknow, New Delhi and Mumbai. He then began studying at the University of Pennsylvania in 1983 on a full scholarship from the University, and graduated Summa cum Laude with dual degrees in electrical engineering from the Moore School and in economics with finance major from the Wharton School in 1988. He was a Benjamin Franklin Scholar at Penn. He received his PhD in physics from Harvard University in 1995.

== Career ==
After conducting post-doctoral research at Columbia University, Kotwal joined Duke University as a professor in 1999, where he is now the Fritz London Distinguished Professor of Physics and has served as the Director of Particle Physics at the University. Additionally, Kotwal was in charge of a Higgs boson search team as part of the ATLAS experiment at the Large Hadron Collider, with the aim of proving the existence of the particle. Kotwal was part of the CERN team that announced the discovery of the Higgs boson in 2012. He conducts experiments at the Large Hadron Collider (LHC) as well as at Fermilab in Chicago. In addition to his research, Kotwal has coordinated a group of U.S. physicists in the global effort to build a new collider with 7 times higher energy than the LHC. He has collaborated with the Chinese and European groups in this effort.

== Research ==
Kotwal leads the world in measuring the mass of the W boson, which is connected to the Higgs boson, using the data from the CDF and D0 experiments at Fermilab. In 2012, he analyzed 1 million W boson events to measure its mass to an accuracy of 0.02%, then the world's most precise measurement, which in turn allowed him to predict the mass of the Higgs boson prior to its discovery in 2012. In 2022, he analyzed 4 million W boson events to measure its mass to an accuracy of 0.01%. This measurement is more precise than all previous measurements combined. It is in significant tension with the value expected from the Standard Model of particle physics, and may imply the existence of new principles of physics in nature. In 2023, the ATLAS experiment released an improved measurement for the mass of the W boson, 80,360 ± 16 MeV, which aligned with predictions from the Standard Model.

== Awards ==
Kotwal was elected Fellow of the American Physical Society in 2008, and Fellow of the American Association for the Advancement of Science in 2012, for performing high-precision measurements that helped deduce the mass of the Higgs boson. Kotwal is the recipient of the Outstanding Junior Investigator Award from the US Department of Energy, and the Alfred P. Sloan Foundation Fellowship. He has received the Dean's Leadership Award from Duke University and is a Fellow of the Maharashtra Academy of Sciences, India.
