= Jandavra language =

Indic language of Pakistan and India

Jandavra
- Region: Sindh, Pakistan; Jodhpur, Rajasthan, India
- Native speakers: (5,000 in Pakistan cited 1998)
- Language family: Indo-European: Indo-Iranian; Indo-Aryan; Western Indo-Aryan; Gujarati or Rajasthani; Jandavra

Language codes
- ISO 639-3: jnd
- Glottolog: jand1246

Jandavra (Jhandoria) is a minor Indic language spoken by Jandavra people of Sindh, Pakistan, and Jodhpur, India.
