= Dahewan =

Dahewan દહેવાણ
- Village in Indian state of Gujarat
- दहेवाण
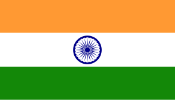
- Flag
- Motto: Satyameva Jayate
- Anthem: Jana Gana Mana
- Interactive map of Dahewan
- Country: India
- State: Gujarat
- District: Anand
- Tehsil: Borsad
- Ruling political party: Bhartiya Janata Party
- Assembly constituency: Borsad (Vidhan Sabha constituency)
- Post office: Kathana Rs

Population (2011)
  - Total: 10,880
- Time zone: Indian Standard Time IST (UTC+5:30)
- Telephone code: 02696
- Pin code: 388550
- Vehicle registration: GJ-23

Dahewan is a village in the Borsad taluka of Anand district in Gujarat state of India. Dahewan is a Gram Panchayat.

== Education ==
=== Colleges ===
- Degree Pharmacy College, Amralali

=== Schools ===
- Hanifa public school, Kashipura
- Vatsalya International School, Borsad
- Madresa Gujrati School (non girl), Borsad
- Napavanta Mishra Shala, Napa Vanta village

== Religious Places ==
=== Hindu ===
- Shiva Mandir, Kathana Station
- Somnath Mahadev Mandir, Kathana Station
- Harsidhdhi Temple, Chandanpura
- Valiyadeva Temple, Chandanpura

=== Muslim ===
- Noorani Masji, Kalamsar
- Nagina Masjid (Sunni), Khanpur
- Masjid, Ranoli
