= Thakor =

Koli caste of Gujarat

Thakor Koli
- Subcaste, or title of Koli caste
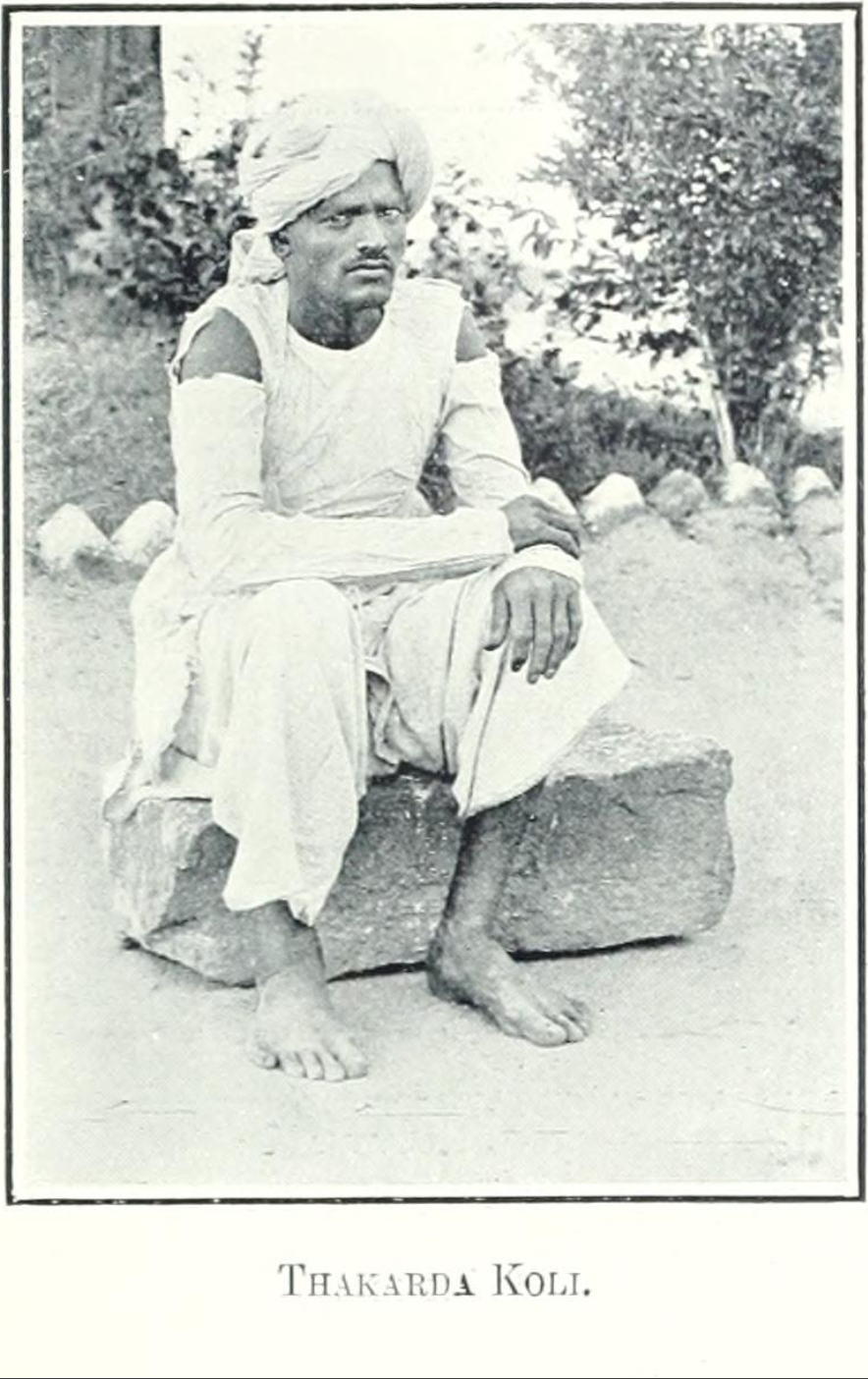
- Photograph of Thakor Koli of Baroda State, 1911
- Location: Gujarat; Daman and Diu
- Parent tribe: Koli people of Gujarat
- Demonym: Thakor Koli
- Branches: Chunvalia Koli
- Language: Wadiyara Koli language, other Koli languages; Gujarati; Hindi; English
- Religion: Hinduism

The Thakor Koli, or Thakarda Koli, is a sub-caste of the Koli caste of Gujarat, India. Koli people form the largest caste-cluster in Gujarat, comprising 24 per cent of the total population of the state. Koli Thakors in Gujarat are classified as Other Backward Class (OBC). During his tenure, the former chief minister, Koli community member Madhav Singh Solanki, included all Koli communities of Gujarat in the OBC category. Koli Thakors are mostly cultivators or small land-owners.

== Social organisations ==
- Kshatriya Koli Thakor Samaj
- Sree Smasth Chunvalia Koli Thakor Velnath Pragati Mandal
- Chunvalia Koli Thakor Seva Trust, Surendranagar

== Social disputes ==
In February 2020, in Sharifda village, in Banaskantha district of Gujarat, Thakor Kolis disrupted the wedding of a Dalit man, a 22-year-old army jawan (soldier). Despite the presence of police officers attempting to protect the wedding procession, they pelted the bridegroom and his followers with stones because they objected to a Dalit bridegroom riding a mare. Three relatives of the groom, including two women, were injured in the attack. Eleven suspects were charged with assault and related offences.

== See also ==
- List of Koli states and clans
- Koli Dance
