= Kotwal (surname) =

Kotwal is an Indian surname. Notable people with the name include:

- Ashutosh Kotwal (born 1965), American particle physicist of Indian origin
- Jennifer Kotwal, Indian actress and model
- Kaizaad Kotwal, Indian producer, director, actor, writer and designer
- Mehboob Alam Kotwal (born 1961), writer of Bollywood film song lyrics
- Shruti Kotwal (born 1991), Indian ice speed skater
