= Muslim Makwana =

Muslim community in Gujarat, India

The Makwana are a Muslim community of Gujarat, India, and Sindh, Pakistan.

== History ==
According to their traditions, their ancestor Bapuji was the son of Harpal Makwana who had come from Karenti, Sindh and had converted to Islam. He founded the principality of Lalpur-Mandva, in Mahikantha. They are Sunni Muslims and speak Gujarati. The Makwana claim descent from the Jhala, also known as Makwana, clan of Rajputs.

In Gujrat the Makwana Muslims are now mainly small peasant proprietors found in north Gujarat.

In Sindh they are now living in Dadu, Matiari, and other districts of Sindh.

== See also ==
- Muslim Rajputs
