= Kotwal =

Indian military title

The Kotwal, also spelled as Cotwal, or Kotval, was a term for police officer used during the medieval and early modern period in South Asia. Kotwals often controlled the fort of a major town or an area of smaller towns on behalf of another ruler. It was similar in function to a British Indian Zaildar From Mughal times the title was given to the local ruler of a large town and the surrounding area. However, the title is also used for leaders in small villages as well. Kotwal has also been translated as Chief police officer. The post of Kotwal was known since ancient times as Kota pala who was the chief of Police.

Among members of the Koli caste, Kotwal is a title, derived from the occupation of fort-keepers or protectors of forts and village leader. Even when a Koli man retired as a Kotwal, he and his descendants would use "Kotwal" as a surname as it signified prestige. Kolis were Kotwal from the times of Mughal rule in Gujarat and were hereditary Kotwal of the royal palaces of Rajkot, Morvi and Bhavnagar Princely states. Kolis of Maharashtra also served as Kotwal in Ahmadnagar Sultanate and controlled the forts.

== See also ==
- Faujdar
- Kiladar
- Castellan
