= Parkari Koli language =

Indo-Aryan language spoken in Pakistan

Parkari Koli
- پارڪري ڪولي
- Native to: Sindh province, Pakistan
- Native speakers: (250,000 cited 1995)
- Language family: Indo-European: Indo-Iranian; Indo-Aryan; Western; Gujarati or Rajasthani; Parkari Koli

Language codes
- ISO 639-3: kvx
- Glottolog: park1237

The Parkari Koli language (sometimes called just Parkari) is an Indo-Aryan language mainly spoken in the province of Sindh, Pakistan. It is spoken in the southeast tip bordering India, in the Tharparkar District, Nagarparkar. Most of the lower Thar Desert, west as far as Indus River, bordered north and west by Hyderabad, to south and west of Badin.

== Lexical similarity ==
77%–83% with Marwari, 83% with Wadiyara Koli.

== Orthography ==
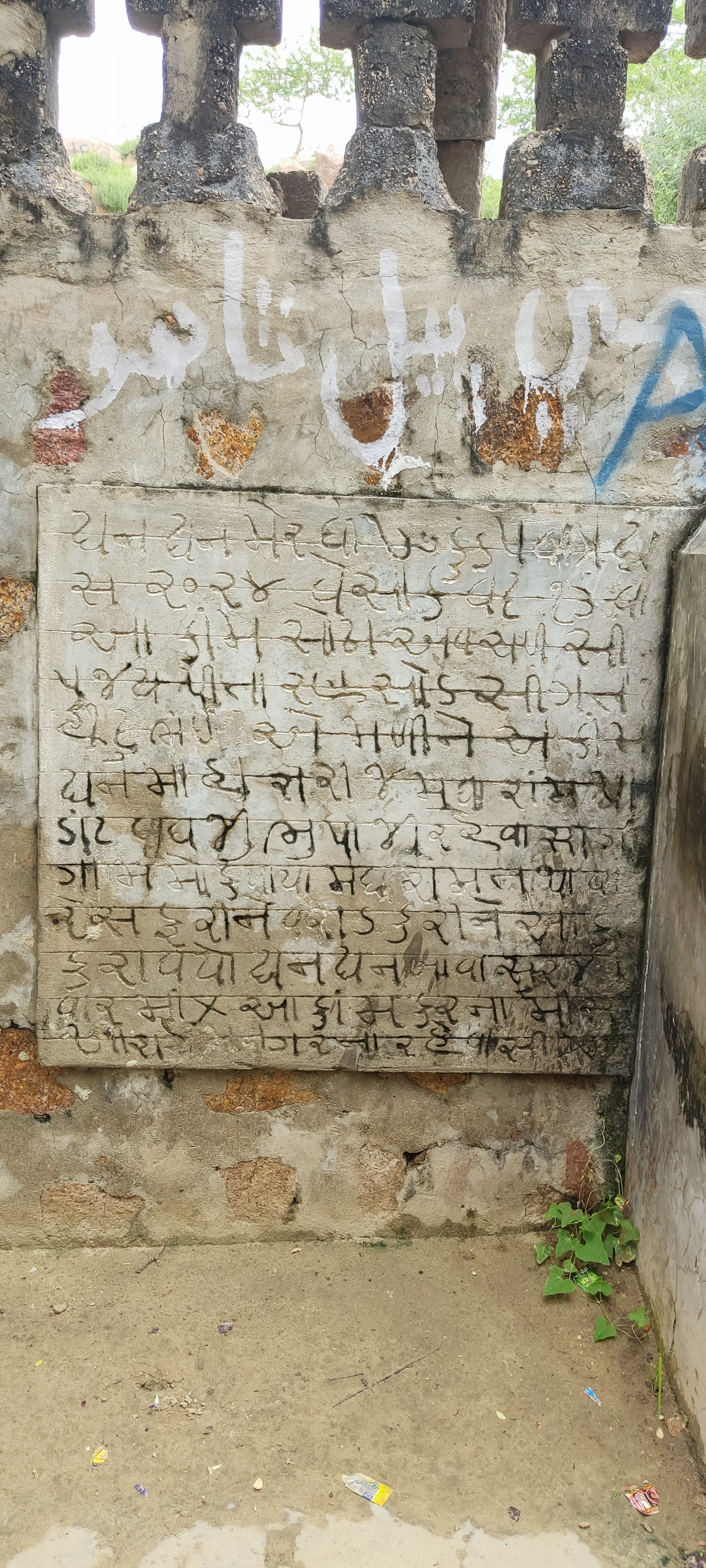
Old Parkari language written on the walls of Sardharo Shiv temple in Tharparkar

The orthography was standardized in 1983-84 and used from 1985 onward. It is based on the Sindhi alphabet which is itself based on modifications done on Persian alphabet, with three additional letters:

- ۮ, representing a voiced dental implosive /ɗ/
- ۯ, representing a retroflex lateral approximant /ɭ/
- ۿ, representing a voiced glottal fricative /ɦ/.

These letters all use an inverted V (like the circumflex) as the diacritical mark. The decision to introduce this symbole was so that these letters would stand out more clearly in Parkari language, as Sindhi already makes frequent use of dots, including letters having as many as 4. The below table shows the Parkari alphabet. These new letters are shaded in blue. Letters shaded in yellow are solely used in writing of loanwords, and the phoneme they represent are also represented by other letters in the alphabet. Letters and digraphs shaded in green aren't usually considered as part of the base alphabet. They are either commonly used digraphs representing aspirated consonants, or are ligatures serving a grammatical function. These ligarues include the ۽, which is pronounced as [ãĩ̯] and represents and, and the ۾, which is pronounced as [mẽ] and it creates a locative relationship between words.

Parkari alphabet
Perso-Arabic [IPA]	ا [∅]/[ʔ]/[aː]	ب [b]	ٻ [ɓ]	ڀ [bʱ]	ت [t]	ٿ [tʰ]
Perso-Arabic [IPA]	ٽ [ʈ]	ٺ [ʈʰ]	ث [s]	پ [p]	ج [d͡ʑ]	ڄ [ʄ]
Perso-Arabic [IPA]	جهہ [d͡ʑʱ]	ڃ [ɲ]	چ [t͡ɕ]	ڇ [t͡ɕʰ]	ح [h]	خ [x]
Perso-Arabic [IPA]	د [d]	ڌ [dʱ]	ۮ [ɗ]	ڏ [ᶑ]	ڊ [ɖ]	ڍ [ɖʱ]
Perso-Arabic [IPA]	ذ [z]	ر [r]	ۯ [ɭ]	ڙ [ɽ]	ڙهہ [ɽʱ]	ز [z]
Perso-Arabic [IPA]	زهہ [zʱ]	ژ [ʒ]	س [s]	ش [ʂ]	ص [s]	ض [z]
Perso-Arabic [IPA]	ط [t]	ظ [z]	ع [ɑː]/[oː]/[eː]/[ʔ]/[∅]	غ [ɣ]	ف [f]	ڦ [pʰ]
Perso-Arabic [IPA]	ق [q]	ڪ [k]	ک [kʰ]	گ [ɡ]	ڳ [ɠ]	گهہ [ɡʱ]
Perso-Arabic [IPA]	ڱ [ŋ]	ل [l]	لهہ [lʱ]	م [m]	مهہ [mʱ]	ن [n]/[◌̃]
Perso-Arabic [IPA]	نهہ [nʱ]	ڻ [ɳ]	ڻهہ [ɳʱ]	و [ʋ]/[ʊ]/[oː]/[ɔː]/[uː]	ھ [h]	ۿ [ɦ]
Perso-Arabic [IPA]	هـ ه [h]	ـہ ہ [ə]/[ə̤]/[∅]	ء [ʔ]/[∅]	ي [j]/[iː]	ئہ [e]	۽ [ɛ̃]
Perso-Arabic [IPA]	۾ [mẽ]					

Similar to its parent alphabet, Sindhi, the orthography of the letter hāʾ, especially as it comes to typing as opposed to handwriting, has been a source of confusion for many. Especially because whereas in Arabic and Persian, there exists one single letter for hāʾ, in Urdu, the letter has diverged into two distinct variants: gol he ("round he") and do-cašmi he ("two-eyed he"). The former is written is written round and zigzagged as "ہـ ـہـ ـہ ہ", and can impart the "h" (/ɦ/) sound anywhere in a word, or the long "a" or the "e" vowels (/ɑː/ or /eː/) at the end of a word. The latter is written in Arabic Naskh style (as a loop) (ھ) , in order to be used in digraphs and to create the aspirate consonants.

For most aspirated consonants, Parkari relies on unique letters as opposed to the Urdu practice of digraphs. However, this doesn't apply to all aspirated consonants. Some are still written as digraphs. The letter hāʾ is also used in Parkari to represent the sound [h] in native Parkari words, in Arabic and Persian loanwords, and to represent vowels (/ə/ or /ə̤/) at the end of the word. The notations and conventions in Parkari and Sindhi are different from either Persian or Arabic and from Urdu. Given the variety of the types of hāʾ across these languages for which Unicode characters have been designed, in order for the letters to be displayed correctly when typing, a correct and consistent convention needs to be followed. The following table will present these in detail.

Unicode	Letter or Digraphs				IPA	Note
Unicode	Final	Medial	Initial	Isolated	IPA	Note
U+06BE	ـھ	ـھـ	ھـ	ھ	[h]	
U+06FF	ـۿ	ـۿـ	ۿـ	ۿ	[ɦ]	Letter unique to Parkari Orthography.
U+0647	ـه	ـهـ	هـ	ه	[h]	Used for borrowed words
U+062C + U+0647	ـجهہ	ـجهـ	جهـ	جهہ	[d͡ʑʱ]	In isolated and final positions, an extra hāʾ ـہ (U+06C1) is added
U+06AF + U+0647	ـگهہ	ـگهـ	گهـ	گهہ	[ɡʱ]	In isolated and final positions, an extra hāʾ ـہ (U+06C1) is added
U+0647	ـهہ	ـهـ	-	-	[◌ʰ] / [◌ʱ]	Forming part of digraph for representation of other aspirated consonants ([ɽʱ], [zʱ], [lʱ], [mʱ], [nʱ], [ɳʱ]). In isolated and final positions, an extra hāʾ ـہ (U+06C1) is added.
U+06C1	ـہ	-	-	ہ	[ə] / [ə̤] / [∅] /	Also added to the letter ئہ in isolated and final positions, when representing the short vowel [e].

== Sample text ==
Below text is the translation into Parkari of the New Testament, specifically a few of the first verses in the second chapter of the Gospel of Matthew. This translation has been produced by the Pakistan Bible Society, an evangelist NGO that has its organizational roots in territories that formed Pakistan, since the time of British colonization.

Parkari Koli Language	Sindhi Translation	English Translation
(۱) ھيرودِيس ڀادشا را راز ۾ زئيون اِيسُو (عيسیٰ) يھوديہ صُوڀا را بيت لحم شھر ۾ زلميو⹁ تو تيا ڪيڙ ڪئينڪ نزُومِي اڳُوڻليا ملڪ ٿِي اوچتا يرُوشلم (بيت المقدس) شھر ۾ آيا.	(۱) يھوديہ جي بادشاهہ ھيروديس جي ڏينهن ۾ عيسيٰ يھوديہ جي بيت‌لحم ڳوٺ ۾ پيدا ٿيو. تڏهن ڪي نجومي اوڀر کان يروشلم (بيت المقدس) ۾ آيا	(1) Now when Jesus was born in Bethlehem of Judaea in the days of Herod the king, behold, there came wise men from the east to Jerusalem,
(۲) اُو آوينَ ام پُنسوا لاڳيا: ”اُو ٻاۯ ڪيٿئہ سئہ⹁ جيو يھُويون رو ڀادشا ٿيا ۿارُو پيڌا ٿيوھ؟ ڪم تو امي اُوئا را زلم را نِيشونَ رو تارو اُڳتون ۮيکيو تو⹁ ۽ امي اُوئا رئِي پُوزا ڪروا آياھ.“	(۲) ۽ اچي پڇيائون تہ ”يھودين جو بادشاهہ جيڪو پيدا ٿيو آھي، سو ڪٿي آھي؟ اسان ھن جو تارو اوڀر ۾ ڏٺو آھي ۽ اسين هن کي سجدو ڪرڻ لاءِ آيا آھيون.“	(2) Saying, Where is he that is born King of the Jews? for we have seen his star in the east, and are come to worship him.
(۳) ھيرودِيس ڀادشا نئہ زئيون ھايا وات رئِي کٻرپڙئِي⹁ تئيون اُو الاھي گهڻو پريشونَ ٿيو⹁ ۽ يرُوشلم (بيت المقدس) شھر را ٻڌائي منک پڻ گهڻا پريشونَ ٿيا.	(۳) ھيروديس بادشاھہ جڏھن ھي ٻڌو تہ ھو ۽ يروشلم (بيت المقدس) جا سڀيئي ماڻهو ڏاڍا پريشان ٿيا.	(3) When Herod the king had heard these things, he was troubled, and all Jerusalem with him.
(۴) تيام اُوئہ يھُودِي قُوم رون ٻڌون موٽون پُوزاريون نئہ ۽ شاستر زوڻيا واۯون نئہ آپ ڪن تيڙاوينَ اُوئون ٿِي پُونسيو: ”شاستر پرموڻئہ ڀڳوونَ را سُونڍل ڀچايا واۯا کرِيست (مسيح) رو زلم ڪيٿئہ ٿيشي؟“	(۴) ھن سڀني سردار ڪاھنن ۽ شريعت جي عالمن کي گهرايو ۽ کانئن پڇيو تہ ”مسيح ڪٿي پيدا ٿيندو؟“	(4) And when he had gathered all the chief priests and scribes of the people together, he demanded of them where Christ should be born.
(۵) تو اُوئي وۯنڌئِي ۮِيڌئِي: ”يھُوديہ صُوڀا را بيت لحم شھر ۾. ڪک تو شاستر ۾ ڀڳوونَ آپرو نياپو ۮِيڌا واۯا ري ھاٿي ام لکايو:	(۵) انهن وراڻيو تہ ”يھوديہ جي بيت‌لحم ۾، ڇاڪاڻ تہ نبيءَ ھيئن لکيو آھي تہ	(5) And they said unto him, In Bethlehem of Judaea: for thus it is written by the prophet,
(۶) ’بيت لحم شھر⹁ جيو يھُوديہ عِلاقا ۾ سئہ⹁ اُپ يھُوديہ رون موٽون شھرون ۾ گهڻا مونَ واۯو سئہ. ڪم تو اُوٿئہ ھيڪ ايوو آڳيوونَ پيڌا ٿيشي جيو مارِي‌ سُونڍل اِسرائيلِي قُوم رئِي ۿمڀاۯ ڪرشي.‘“	(۶) ’اي بيت‌لحم! يھوديہ جي ملڪ ۾، تون ڪنهن بہ طرح يھوديہ جي شھزادن مان ڪنهن کان بہ ننڍو نہ آھين، ڇاڪاڻ تہ تو منجهان ھڪ حاڪم نڪرندو، جيڪو منهنجي قوم بني اسرائيل جي رھبري ڪندو.‘“	And thou Bethlehem, in the land of Juda, art not the least among the princes of Juda: for out of thee shall come a Governor, that shall rule my people Israel.
