= Koli people =

Indian caste and ethnic group

Koli
कोली, કોલી, कोळी
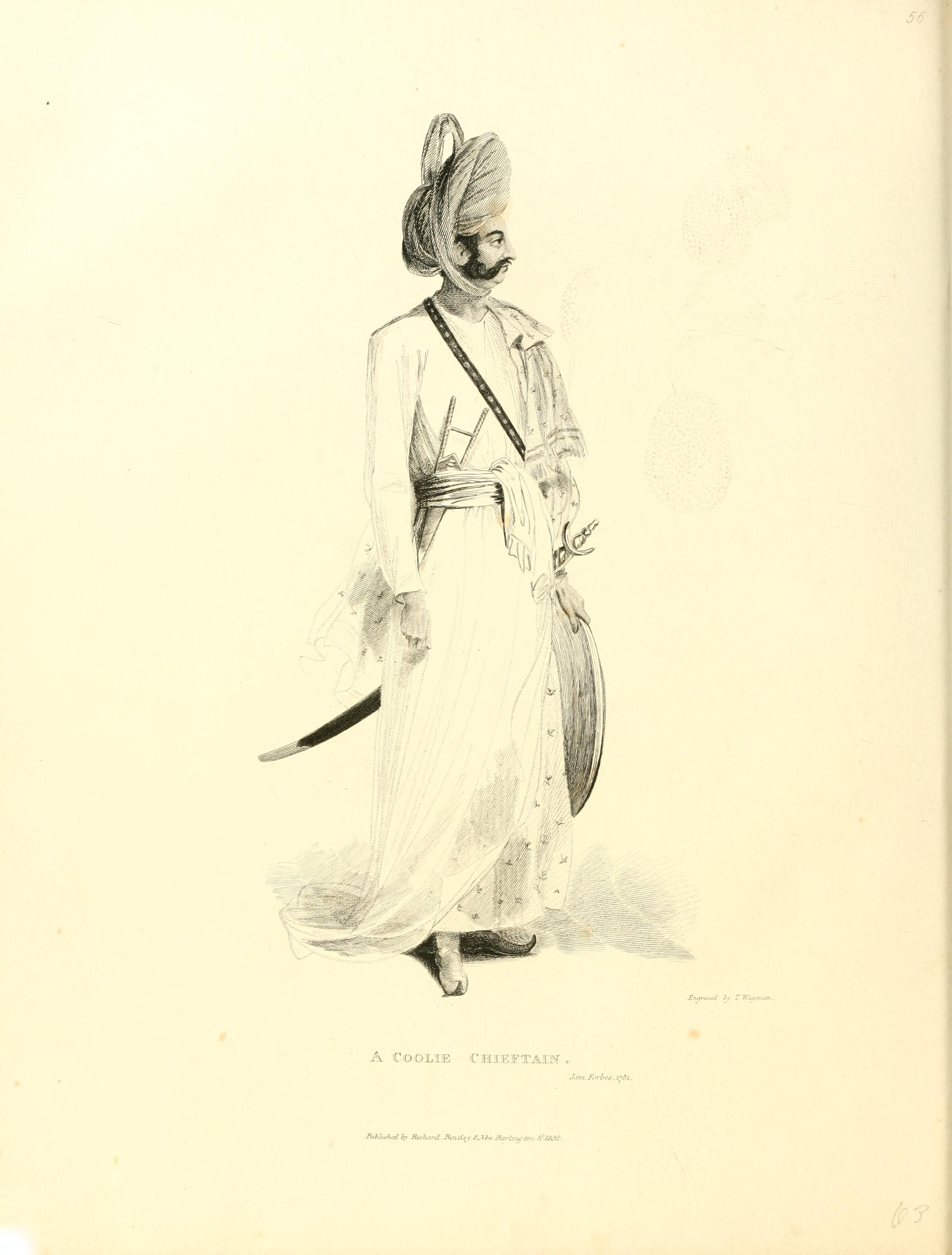
- A portrait of a Koli chieftain of Dahewan by James Forbes, 1813

Languages
- Kachi Koli, Parkari Koli, Wadiyara Koli, Rathwi Bareli, Hindi, Gujarati, Konkani, Marathi, Bhil, Kannada

Religion
- Hindu, Muslim, Christian

Related ethnic groups
- Kori, Koli Christians

The Koli people are an agriculturist caste of India, mostly found in Gujarat and Himachal Pradesh. At the beginning of the 20th century, the Koli caste was recognised as a criminal tribe under Criminal Tribes Act by British Indian government because of their anti-social activities; but during World War I, Kolis were recognised as a martial caste by British Indian Empire. Kolis of Gujarat were well-known pirates of Arabian Sea.

The Kolis form the largest caste cluster in Gujarat comprising 24% of the total population in the states.

== Distribution ==
- India: Kolis are distributed across the country, though the majority of the population is found in the Indian states of Gujarat, Himachal Pradesh, and Maharashtra. Kolis are 24% of the total state population in Gujarat and 7.5% of Himachal Pradesh.
- Pakistan: Kolis are found in the Sindh province of Pakistan, most of them related to Kolis of Gujarat.
- Penang Island: Kolis also found in the Penang Island. They were sent by the British Indian government because of their rebellious activities against the British East India Company during Indian Rebellion of 1857.
- Fiji and New Zealand: Koli citizens here are agriculturists by profession and use the surname of Patel.
- Nepal: Kolis of Nepal ruled over the cities of Ramgram, Devdaha and Panditpur.
- East Africa: Kolis of East Africa referred to themselves as Mandhata Patel, Mandhata Koli Patel and Koli Patel. Many of them are employed as businesspeople, teachers, or doctors.

== History ==
The Kolis seem to have attained an important socio political status by the fourteenth century, at least on Konkan coast in Maharashtra. A Koli kingdom is known to have been founded by Jayba Popera in North Konkan in 1342. During the reign of Shivaji, Kolis had served the Maratha army under their Koli commanders Yesaji Kank and Tanaji Malusare and exercised considerable control over the Konkan coast. The Bahmanis conferred the rank of Sardar on Koli chiefs who held charge of hill tracts.

In contrast, Kolis of Gujarat were mostly perceived as a predatory tribe. From the literature of the medieval period and in travellers' accounts, there is suspicion that some descendants of medieval Bhil chiefs, particularly those of Ahmedabad, could have claimed the status of Koli. Records of Koli people exist from at least the 15th century, when rulers in the present-day Gujarat region called their chieftains marauding robbers, dacoits, and pirates. Over a period of several centuries, some of them were able to establish chiefdoms throughout the region, mostly comprising just a single village. Although not Rajputs, this relatively small subset of the Kolis claimed the status of the higher-ranked Rajput community, adopting their customs and intermixing with less significant Rajput families through the practice of hypergamous marriage, which was commonly used to enhance or secure social status. There were significant differences in status throughout the Koli community, however, and little cohesion either geographically or in terms of communal norms, such as the establishment of endogamous marriage groups.

=== Criminal Tribes Act ===
The Koli caste of Maharashtra and Gujarat was classified as Criminal Tribes under Criminal Tribes Act of 1871 by the Government of India because of their anti-social activities such as robberies, murder, blackmailing, and crop and animal theft. In 1914, Kolis of Maharashtra revolted against British rule and attacked government officials. In retribution, the government again declared the Kolis as a criminal tribe under the Bombay Criminal Tribes Act.

=== Twentieth century ===
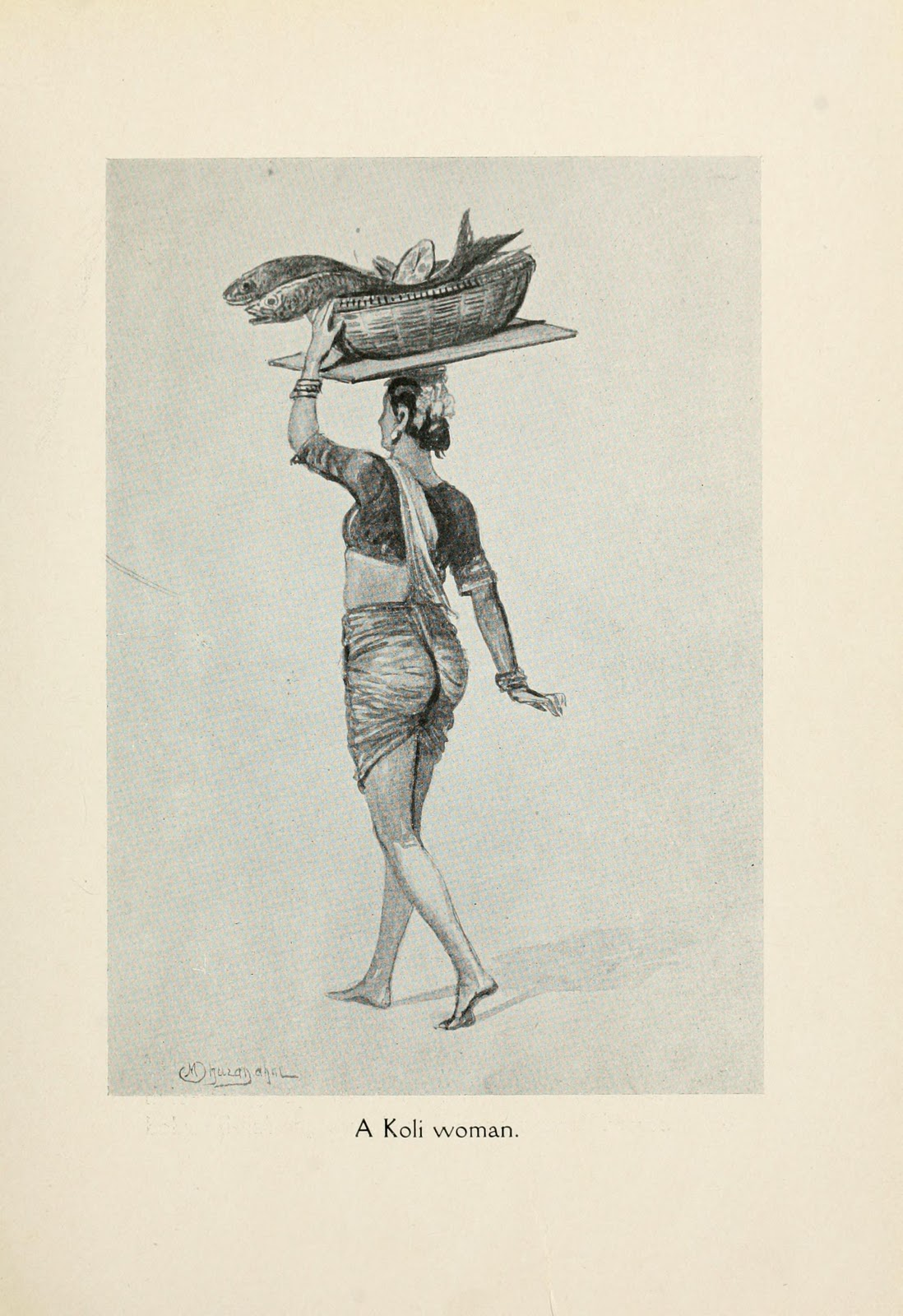
A Koli woman

Throughout the colonial British Raj period and into the 20th century, some Kolis remained significant landholders and tenants, although most had never been more than minor landowners and labourers. By this time, however, most Kolis had lost their once-equal standing with the Patidar (Note: The Patidars were formerly known as Kanbi, but by 1931 had gained official recognition as Patidar.) community due to the land reforms of the Raj period. The Kolis preferred the landlord-based tenure system, which was not so mutually beneficial. They were subject to interference from the British revenue collectors, who intervened to ensure that the stipulated revenue was remitted to the government before any surplus went to the landlord. Being less inclined to take an active role in agriculture personally and thus maximise revenues from their landholdings, the Koli possessions were often left uncultivated or underused. The Kanbi land takeovers also reduced the Kolis to being the tenants and agricultural labourers of Kanbis rather than landowners, thus increasing the economic inequality between the communities. The difference was further exacerbated by the Kanbis' providing better tenancy arrangements for members of their own community than for Kolis.

During the later period of the British Raj, the Gujarati Kolis became involved in the process of what has subsequently been termed sanskritisation. At that time, in the 1930s, they represented around 20 percent of the region's population. Members of the local Rajput community were seeking to extend their own influence by co-opting other significant groups as claimants to the ritual title of Kshatriya. The Rajputs were politically, economically, and socially marginalised because their own numbers — around 4 to 5 per cent of the population — were lesser to the dominant Patidars, with whom the Kolis were also disenchanted.

=== Post Independence ===
The Patidars of central and north Gujarat were agricultural labour on the lands of Koli landlords or Koli chieftains. After India achieved independence, Patidars occupied Koli lands through the Urban Land Ceiling Act, reducing the Kolis in social status. The Kolis, upset at their loss of rights, formed gangs to plunder Patidar villages. The Rajputs of Gujarat, similarly in contention with the Patidars over land rights, allied with Kolis. In central and north Gujarat, the Kolis and their allies had several battles with the Patidars on the issue of land tenancy, land rights, and use of common village resources.

==== KKGKS ====
In 1947, around the time that India gained independence, the Kutch, Kathiawar, Gujarat Kshatriya Sabha (KKGKS) caste association emerged as an umbrella organisation to continue the work begun during the Raj. Christophe Jaffrelot, a French political scientist, says that this body, which claimed to represent the Rajputs and Kolis, "...is a good example of the way castes, with very different ritual status, join hands to defend their common interests... The use of the word Kshatriya was largely tactical and the original caste identity was seriously diluted."

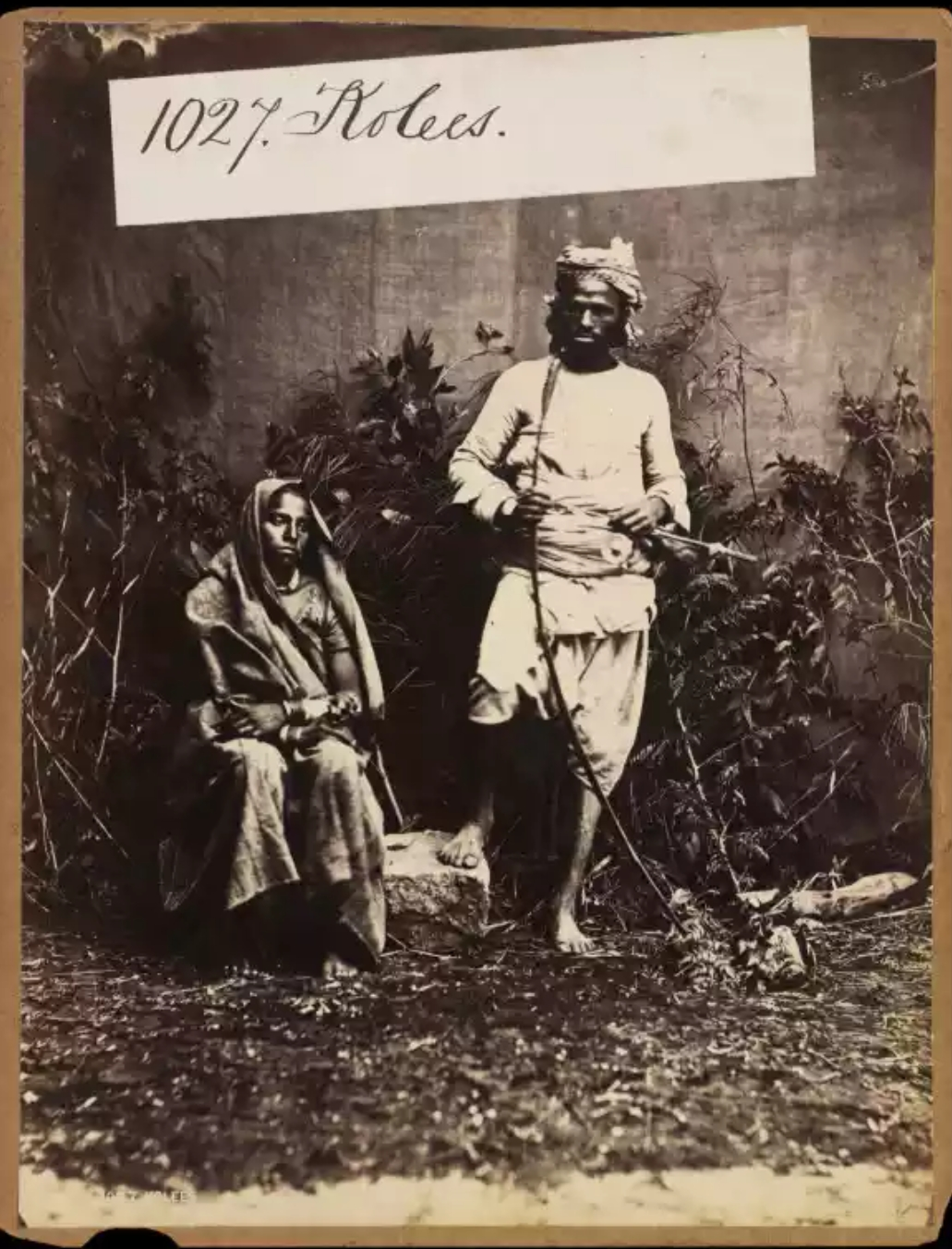
Koli woman and Koli man with the Bow and Arrow, 19th century

The relevance of the Kshatriya label in terms of ritual was diminished by the practical actions of the KKGKS which, among other things, saw demands for the constituent communities to be classified as Backward Classes in the Indian scheme for positive discrimination. The Kolis gained more from the actions of the KKGKS than did the Rajputs, and Jaffrelot believes that it was around this time that a Koli intelligentsia emerged. Ghanshyam Shah, a professor at Jawaharlal Nehru University, describes the organisation today as covering a broad group of communities, from disadvantaged Rajputs of high prestige to the semi-tribal Bhils, with the Kolis in the middle. He notes that its composition reflects "a common economic interest and a growing secular identity born partly out of folklore but more out of common resentment against the well-to-do castes".

In the election years of 1962 and 1967, the Gujarat Swatantra Party, dominated by the Patidars, won over some of the Koli leaders of the Gujarat Kshatriya Sabha, allowing Sabha to be controlled by Kolis of North Gujarat. The Party nominated a large number of the Kolis as party candidates and also gave them positions within the party organization. The alliance between the Koli and the Party quickly broke down. The party and the Kshatriya Sabha's Koli leaders could not resolve ground-level conflicts between the Koli peasants and Patidar peasants. The Patidar's issues were resolved by Gujarat Kshatriya Sabha but the large population prevented the issues of the Kolis from being solved. For example, the majority of the Patidar's children were engaged in college education while few Kolis received similar education.

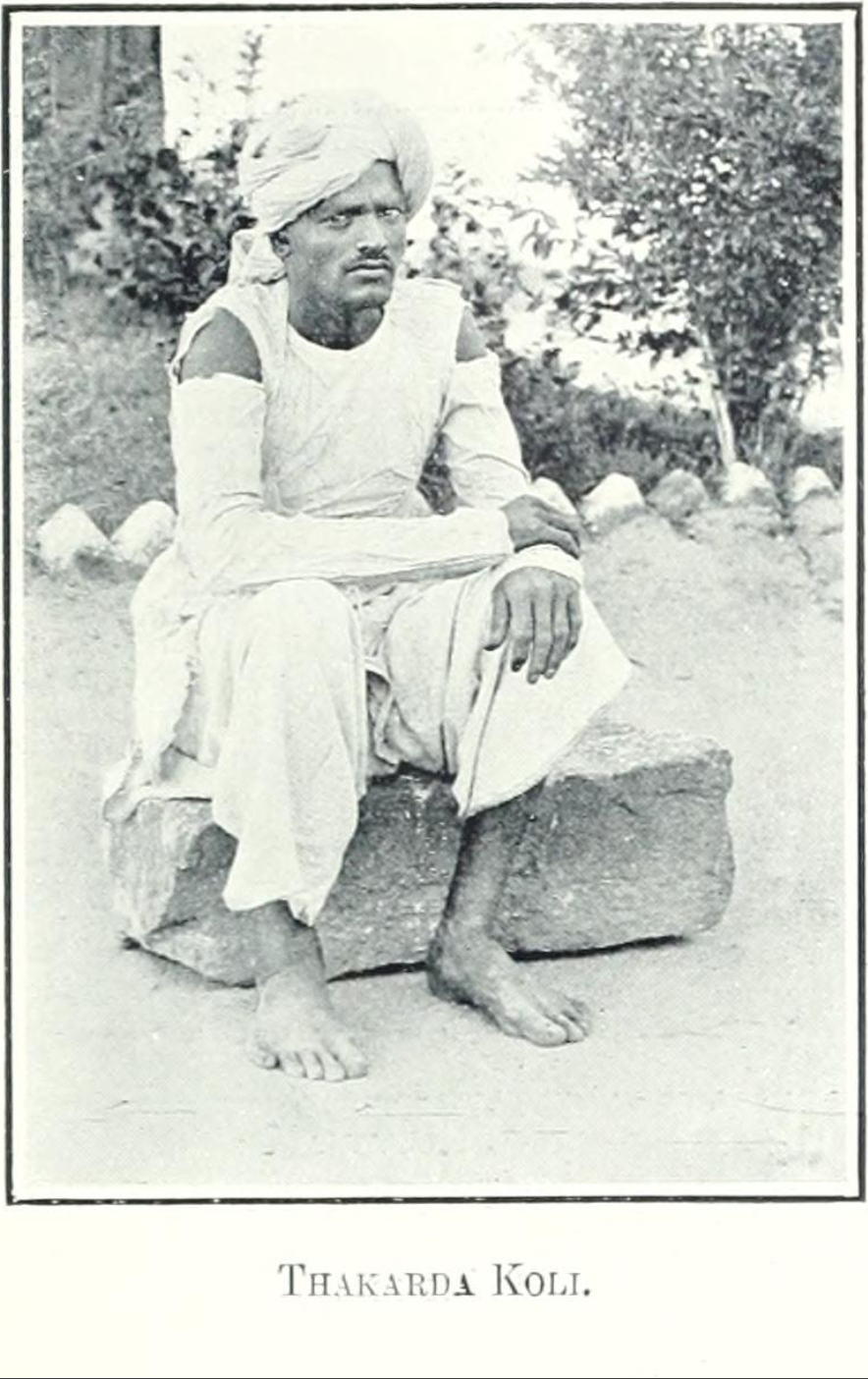
A Thakarda Koli from Baroda State in 1911.

The Kolis of Gujarat remained educationally and occupationally disadvantaged compared to communities such as the Brahmins and Patidars. Their many Jātis include the Bareeya, Khant and Thakor, and they also use Koli as a suffix, giving rise to groups such as the Gulam Koli and Matia Koli. Some do not refer to themselves as Koli at all.

== Military ==
=== Maratha Empire ===
When Shivaji began his revolt against Mughal sultanates, the Kolis were among the first to join him under the leadership of the Khemirao Sarnaik. The Kolis of Maharashtra joined the Maratha Army during the reign of Shivaji. The Kolis also served in the Maratha navy. The grand admiral of Maratha Navy was manned by Koli chieftain Kanhoji Angre, which earnt him the title Shivaji of the Sea. The army warriors were manned by Koli commander Tanaji Malusare. The Kolis formed the important Mavala army of Shivaji at the Shivneri Fort in Junnar. A Koli chief named Laya Patil who was the fleet chief in the Maratha navy was honoured by Shivaji with the title of Sarpatil for his courageous attack at Janjira. In 1665, under Shivaji, Koli soldiers played an important role during the battle of Purandar.

=== Deccan Sultanate ===
The Kolis of Maharashtra, served in the Deccan sultanates. They also served in the Bahmani sultanate as fortkeepers and the Sultans respected the Koli officers with the title of Sardar. The Ahmednagar sultanate conferred important positions to Kolis such as Sardar and Mansabdar.

=== Gujarat Sultanate ===
The Kolis of Gujarat served in the royal army of Gujarat Sultanate during the reign of Bahadur Shah. Kolis attacked the Mughal emperor Humayun in the defence of Gujarat sultan Bahadur Shah and looted the Mughal army at the Gulf of Khambhat.

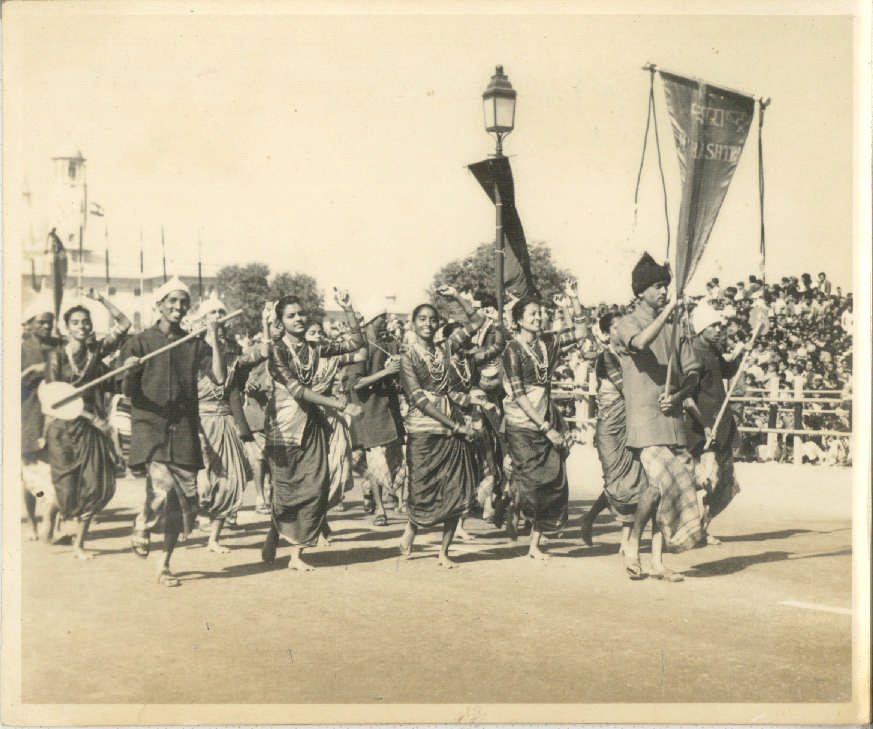
Kolis of Bandra during Republic day parade performing Koli Dance

=== British Indian Empire ===
During the 1857 mutiny, the Deccan Koli Corps was formed under Captain Nuttall. When the regular troops were withdrawn in 1860, their places were taken by detachments of Koli corps. The Koli corps continued to perform this duty till 1861 when they were disbanded and some of them entered in police service. Like the Deccan Koli Corps of Maharashtra, the Gujarat Koli Corps was formed in Gujarat to subdue local rebellions. The Gujarat Koli Corps was honoured with the Mutiny Medal for the courage of Koli soldiers by the then Governor of Bombay Lord Elphinstone.

During the First World War, Kolis of Himachal Pradesh were recruited in the British Indian Army and Kolis of Punjab were enlisted in British infantry troops. The British Indian Navy, or Bombay Navy, was manned by the Kolis of Mumbai during the British Raj in India.

The Shial is a clan of Koli caste found in the Indian state of Gujarat. They were noted pirates of Gujarat. The Shial Kolis got their name from the Shial island situated at the south coast of Kathiawar. Shial Kolis defeated and captured the Shial island from Portuguese India and made it their stronghold along with Chanch, Gujarat but were later defeated by the Nawab of Janjira and Jafrabad. During the World War I, they were enlisted as soldiers in the British Indian Army by the British Indian government.

=== Portuguese India ===
The Kolis of Maharashtra served in the Portuguese Indian navy. Kolis were most important for the Portuguese Indian rulers because in wartime, Kolis often fought with their own boats and gallivats. Despite their difficult financial state, the Portuguese rulers built two warships especially for Kolis to fight against pirates and other marine threats.

=== Princely States ===
The Princely State of Baroda enlisted eight to ten thousand Koli soldiers in their army. The Kotwals of the royal palaces of Bhavnagar, Morvi, and Rajkot princely states were Talpada Kolis of Radhavanaj village of the Kheda district.

== Classification ==
The Koli community has been classified as an Other Backward Class community by the Government of India in the Indian States of Gujarat, Karnataka, Maharashtra and Uttar Pradesh. However, Tokre Koli, Malhar Koli, and Mahadev Kolis are listed as Scheduled Tribe by the State Government of Maharashtra. The Government of India classified the Koli community as Scheduled Caste in the 2011 census for the states of Himachal Pradesh, Delhi, Madhya Pradesh and Rajasthan.

== See also ==
- List of Koli people
