= Kachi Koli language =

Gujarati language

Kachi Koli
- Native to: Pakistan, India
- Native speakers: (500,000 cited 1995–2000)
- Language family: Indo-European: Indo-Iranian; Indo-Aryan; Western; Gujarati; Kachi Koli
- Writing system: Arabic (Naskh), Gujarati

Language codes
- ISO 639-3: gjk
- Glottolog: kach1272 Kachi

Kachi Koli is an Indo-Aryan language spoken in India. There is a small population of Koli who live across the border in eastern Sindh province in neighbouring Pakistan. Part of the Gujarati subfamily, Kachi Koli is closely related to Parkari Koli and Wadiyara Koli.
