= Wadiyara Koli language =

Indo-Aryan language of India and Pakistan

Wadiyara Koli
- Native to: India and Pakistan
- Region: Gujarat state and Sindh province
- Native speakers: 583,000 (2018)
- Language family: Indo-European: Indo-Iranian; Indo-Aryan; Western; Gujarati; Wadiyara Koli

Language codes
- ISO 639-3: kxp
- Glottolog: wadi1248

Wadiyara Koli is an Indo-Aryan language of the Gujarati group. It is spoken by the Wadiyara people, who originate from Wadiyar in Gujarat; many of whom are thought to have migrated to Sindh in the early twentieth century, following the onset of famine. The Wadiyara people are affiliated with the Bhil people and Koli people, but are generally more inclined towards associating themselves with the Koli; they are often regarded as a subgroup of the latter.

== Phonology ==
=== Vowels ===
Wadiyari possesses eight distinct oral monophthongs coupled with five nasal monophthongs, in addition to five oral diphthongs and two contrastive nasal diphthongs. Oral vowels are also assimilated before nasal consonants.

==== Monophthongs ====
The word-initial occurrence of close front oral monophthongs is exceedingly rare. Generally, the close back monophthong is the most regular; but this is also uncommon in word-initial contexts. The short nasal monophthong is decidedly less frequent than its nasal counterparts, while the mid-back nasal monophthong does not occur word-finally. Occurrences of nasal monophthongs word-initially are extremely uncommon.

==== Diphthongs ====
No oral diphthongs can occur word-initially. As a whole, diphthongs are profoundly limited in occurrence; some can only occur word-medially and others word-finally.

Vowels
	Front	Central	Back
Close	i		u
Close-mid	e	ə	o
Open-mid	ɛ	ə	ɔ
Open	(æ)	ɑ	

=== Consonants ===
Wadiyara Koli possesses 38 distinct phonemic consonants, which entail seven places and eight manners of articulation.

		Labial	Dental/ Alveolar	Retroflex	Postal. /Palatal	Velar	Glottal
Nasal		m	n	ɳ		ŋ	
Plosive	voiceless	p	t	ʈ	tʃ	k	
Plosive	voiced	b	d	ɖ	dʒ	ɡ	
Plosive	aspirated	pʰ	tʰ	ʈʰ	tʃʰ	kʰ	
Plosive	murmured	bʱ	dʱ	ɖʱ	dʒʱ	ɡʱ	
Implosive		ɓ	ɗ	ᶑ	ʄ	ɠ	
Fricative	voiceless	(f)	s		ʃ		
Fricative	voiced		(z)				ɦ
Approximant		ʋ	l	ɭ̆	j		
Flap			ɾ				

==== Implosives and plosives ====
Implosives in Wadiyari involve five different places of articulation. It is noteworthy that bilabial and dental implosives do not appear word-finally; and the manifestation of the pre-palatal/palatal implosive is relatively less frequent. Wadiyara Koli's 16 plosive consonants have four places of articulation: the bilabial, alveolar, retroflex, and velar. There are clear contrasts between voicing and unvoicing, as well an unaspirated and aspirated consonants. Plosives are generally unrestricted, with the exception of the voiced bilabial and voiced retroflex aspirated stops. These do not appear word-finally, although the other aspirated plosives do so rather infrequently.

==== Nasal consonants ====
Wadiyari possesses four discernible nasal phonemes; the bilabial, the alveolar, the retroflex, and the velar; the latter two are restricted. The retroflex nasal is visible word-medially and word-finally, but never at the beginning of a word. However, it does manifest itself pre-syllabically. The velar nasal is similarly constrained, and also exclusive to the coda of a syllable. Most of the time it is followed by the voiced velar plosive, but it can also be followed by the lateral retroflex, as well as occurring independently.

==== Fricatives and affricates ====
Unusually for Indo-Aryan languages, four distinct phonemic fricatives are recorded in Wadiyari; contrasting at three places of articulation: the alveolar, the post-alveolar, and the glottal. All of these are unrestricted. A labiodental fricative was also observed; however, this is wholly restricted to Persian loanwords. Alveolar fricatives are often affricatized. The post-alveolar produces three distinct affricates: the voiced, the voiceless, and the voiceless aspirated. The latter cannot occur word-finally; the unaspirated counterparts can, but not regularly.

==== Flaps, laterals, and approximants ====
The alveolar flap and retroflex flap are distinguished at two places of articulation: the alveolar and the retroflex. The former is sometimes articulated as a trill, and the latter only occurs word-medially or word-finally. Unlike some Indo-Aryan languages, the retroflex flap stands in contrastive distribution with the voiced retroflex stop.

Like flaps, Wadiyari possesses two separate laterals at two separate places of articulation: the alveolar and the retroflex. The former is unrestricted in its occurrence, unlike the latter, which can only occur word-medially and word-finally. Wadiyari has a bilabial approximant in addition to a palatal approximant; the latter is restricted to word-initial and word-medial occurrences.
