= Code page 1127 =

Character encoding

Code page 1127 (CCSID 1127), also known as Arabic / French PC Data, is used by IBM in its PC DOS operating system. It is closely related to code page 1046.

== Code page layout ==
Code page 1127
	0	1	2	3	4	5	6	7	8	9	A	B	C	D	E	F
0x		☺	─	│	┼	┤	┬	•	◘	○	◙	♂	♀	♪	♫	☼
1x	►	◄	├	┴	¶	§	┐	┌	↑	↓	→	←	└	┘	▲	▼
2x	SP	!	"	#	$	٪	&	'	(	)	٭	+	,	-	.	/
3x	0	1	2	3	4	5	6	7	8	9	:	;	<	=	>	?
4x	@	A	B	C	D	E	F	G	H	I	J	K	L	M	N	O
5x	P	Q	R	S	T	U	V	W	X	Y	Z	[	\	]		_
6x	`	a	b	c	d	e	f	g	h	i	j	k	l	m	n	o
7x	p	q	r	s	t	u	v	w	x	y	z	{	|	}	~	
8x	ﺈ	ﻰ	é	â	ﻳ	à	ﹿ	ç	ê	ﹱ	è	ï	î	×	÷	¬
9x	ﹹ	ﹻ	ﹽ	ô	ﹷ	ﺊ	û	ù	ﻲ	ﻎ	ﻏ	ﻐ	س	ش	ص	ض
Ax	NBSP	�	�	�	¤	�	ئ	ﺑ	ﺗ	ﺛ	ﺟ	ﺣ	،	SHY	ﺧ	ﺳ
Bx	٠	١	٢	٣	٤	٥	٦	٧	٨	٩	ﺷ	؛	ﺻ	ﺿ	ﻊ	؟
Cx	ﻋ	ء	آ	أ	ؤ	إ	ئ	ﺍ	ب	ة	ت	ث	ج	ح	خ	د
Dx	ذ	ر	ز	س	ش	ص	ض	ط	ظ	ع	غ	ﻌ	ﺂ	ﺄ	ﺎ	ﻓ
Ex	ـ	ف	ق	ك	ل	م	ن	ﻫ	و	ى	ي	ً	ٌ	ٍ	َ	ُ
Fx	ِ	ّ	ْ	ﻗ	ﻛ	ﻟ	ﹳ	�	�	�	�	ﻣ	ﻧ	ﻬ	ه	¢

� Not in Unicode
