= Code page 1046 =

Computer character set for Arabic

Code page 1046 (CCSID 1046 and euro sign extended CCSID 9238), also known as Arabic Extended-Euro, is used by IBM platforms in Egypt, Iraq, Jordan, Saudi Arabia, and Syria for Arabic. It is similar to the DOS code page 1127.

== Code page layout ==
Code page 1046
	0	1	2	3	4	5	6	7	8	9	A	B	C	D	E	F
2x	SP	!	"	#	$	٪	&	'	(	)	٭	+	,	-	.	/
3x	0	1	2	3	4	5	6	7	8	9	:	;	<	=	>	?
4x	@	A	B	C	D	E	F	G	H	I	J	K	L	M	N	O
5x	P	Q	R	S	T	U	V	W	X	Y	Z	[	\	]		_
6x	`	a	b	c	d	e	f	g	h	i	j	k	l	m	n	o
7x	p	q	r	s	t	u	v	w	x	y	z	{	|	}	~	
8x	ﺈ	×	÷	س	ش	ص	ض	ﹱ		■	│	─	┐	┌	└	┘
9x	ﹹ	ﹻ	ﹽ	ﹿ	ﹷ	ﺊ	ﻰ	ﻳ	ﻲ	ﻎ	ﻏ	ﻐ	ﻶ	ﻸ	ﻺ	ﻼ
Ax	NBSP	�	�	�	¤	�	ئ	ﺑ	ﺗ	ﺛ	ﺟ	ﺣ	،	SHY	ﺧ	ﺳ
Bx	٠	١	٢	٣	٤	٥	٦	٧	٨	٩	ﺷ	؛	ﺻ	ﺿ	ﻊ	؟
Cx	ﻋ	ء	آ	أ	ؤ	إ	ئ	ﺍ	ب	ة	ت	ث	ج	ح	خ	د
Dx	ذ	ر	ز	س	ش	ص	ض	ط	ظ	ع	غ	ﻌ	ﺂ	ﺄ	ﺎ	ﻓ
Ex	ـ	ف	ق	ك	ل	م	ن	ﻫ	و	ى	ي	◌ً	◌ٌ	◌ٍ	◌َ	◌ُ
Fx	◌ِ	◌ّ	◌ْ	ﻗ	ﻛ	ﻟ	ﹳ	ﻵ	ﻷ	ﻹ	ﻻ	ﻣ	ﻧ	ﻬ	ه	€
Not in Unicode, mapped to private use area: second (left) halves of لآ, لأ, لإ and لا respectively, for use in conjunction with the U+FEDF ﻟ ARABIC LETTER LAM INITIAL FORM at 0xF5. Notice also the pre-composed forms of this ligature at 0x9C–9F and 0xF7–FA.

=== Code page 1029 ===
Code page 1029 is an older variant of Code page 1046.

Code page 1029
	0	1	2	3	4	5	6	7	8	9	A	B	C	D	E	F
2x	SP	!	"	#	$	٪	&	'	(	)	٭	+	,	-	.	/
3x	0	1	2	3	4	5	6	7	8	9	:	;	<	=	>	?
4x	@	A	B	C	D	E	F	G	H	I	J	K	L	M	N	O
5x	P	Q	R	S	T	U	V	W	X	Y	Z	[	\	]		_
6x	`	a	b	c	d	e	f	g	h	i	j	k	l	m	n	o
7x	p	q	r	s	t	u	v	w	x	y	z	{	|	}	~	
8x																
9x																
Ax	NBSP	�	�	�	¤	ئ	�	ﺑ	ﺗ	ﺛ	ﺟ	ﺣ	،	SHY	ﺧ	ﺳ
Bx	٠	١	٢	٣	٤	٥	٦	٧	٨	٩	ﺷ	؛	ﺻ	ﺿ	ﻊ	؟
Cx	ﻋ	ء	آ	أ	ؤ	إ	ئ	ﺍ	ب	ة	ت	ث	ج	ح	خ	د
Dx	ذ	ر	ز	س	ش	ص	ض	ط	ظ	ع	غ	ﻌ	ﻎ	ﻏ	ﻐ	ﻓ
Ex	ـ	ف	ق	ك	ل	م	ن	ه	و	ى	ي	◌ً	◌ٌ	◌ٍ	◌َ	◌ُ
Fx	◌ِ	◌ّ	◌ْ	ﻗ	ﻛ	ﻟ	ﻣ	ﻧ	ﻫ	ﻳ	ﹷ	ﹹ	ﹻ	ﹽ	ﹿ	
Not in Unicode, mapped to private use area: second (left) halves of لآ, لأ, لإ and لا respectively, for use in conjunction with the U+FEDF ﻟ ARABIC LETTER LAM INITIAL FORM at 0xF5. Code page 1029 does not include the pre-composed forms of this ligature found in code page 1046. Differences from code page 1046.
