= Xerox Character Code Standard =

Obsolete character code standard developed by Xerox Corporation

Xerox Character Code Standard (XCCS)
- Languages: English, French, German, Russian, Chinese, Japanese, Korean
- Created by: Xerox

The Xerox Character Code Standard (XCCS) is a historical 16-bit character encoding that was created by Xerox in 1980 for the exchange of information between elements of the Xerox Network Systems Architecture. It encodes the characters required for languages using the Latin, Arabic, Hebrew, Greek and Cyrillic scripts, the Chinese, Japanese and Korean writing systems, and technical symbols.

It can be viewed as an early precursor of, and inspiration for, the Unicode Standard.

The International Character Set (ICS) is compatible with XCCS.

The XCCS 2.0 (1990) revision covers Latin, Arabic, Hebrew, Gothic, Armenian, Runic, Georgian, Greek, Cyrillic, Hiragana, Katakana, Bopomofo scripts, technical, and mathematical symbols.

== Code charts ==
=== Character sets overview ===
XCCS Lead byte
	0	1	2	3	4	5	6	7	8	9	A	B	C	D	E	F
0x	00															
1x																
2x		21	22	23	24	25	26	27	28	29						
3x	30	31	32	33	34	35	36	37	38	39	3A	3B	3C	3D	3E	3F
4x	40	41	42	43	44	45	46	47	48	49	4A	4B	4C	4D	4E	4F
5x	50	51	52	53	54	55	56	57	58	59	5A	5B	5C	5D	5E	5F
6x	60	61	62	63	64	65	66	67	68	69	6A	6B	6C	6D	6E	6F
7x	70	71	72	73	74	75	76									
8x																
9x																
Ax																
Bx																
Cx																
Dx																
Ex	E0	E1	E2	E3											EE	EF
Fx	F0	F1													FE	FF

=== Character set 0x00 (ASCII/ISO/CCITT Latin alphabet and punctuation) ===
XCCS (prefixed with 0x00)
	0	1	2	3	4	5	6	7	8	9	A	B	C	D	E	F
0x																
1x																
2x	SP	!	"	#	¤	%	&	ʼ	(	)	*	+	,	-	.	/
3x	0	1	2	3	4	5	6	7	8	9	:	;	<	=	>	?
4x	@	A	B	C	D	E	F	G	H	I	J	K	L	M	N	O
5x	P	Q	R	S	T	U	V	W	X	Y	Z	[	\	]		_
6x	`	a	b	c	d	e	f	g	h	i	j	k	l	m	n	o
7x	p	q	r	s	t	u	v	w	x	y	z	{	|	}	~	
8x																
9x																
Ax		¡	¢	£	$	¥		§		‘	“	«	←	↑	→	↓
Bx	°	±	²	³	×	µ	¶	·	÷	’	”	»	¼	½	¾	¿
Cx		`	´	ˆ	˜	¯	˘	˙	¨		˚	¸	ˍ	˝	˛	ˇ
Dx	―	¹	©	®	™	♪							⅛	⅜	⅝	⅞
Ex	Ω	Æ	Ð	ª	Ħ	ȷ	Ĳ	Ŀ	Ł	Ø	Œ	º	Þ	Ŧ	Ŋ	ŉ
Fx	ĸ	æ	đ	ð	ħ	ı	ĳ	ŀ	ł	ø	œ	ß	þ	ŧ	ŋ	

=== Character set 0x21 (Symbols 1 - Japanese punctuation and math symbols) ===
XCCS (prefixed with 0x21)
	0	1	2	3	4	5	6	7	8	9	A	B	C	D	E	F
0x																
1x																
2x		IDSP	、	。			·					゙	゚	´		¨
3x		‾		ヽ	ヾ	ゝ	ゞ	〃	仝	々	〆	〇	ー	—	–	
4x		〜	‖		…	‥	‘	’	“	”			〔	〕		
5x			〈	〉	《	》	「	」	『	』	【	】		−		×
6x	÷		≠			≦	≧	∞	∴	♀	♂	°	′	″	℃	¥
7x		¢	£						§	☆	★	○	●	◎	◇	
8x																
9x																
Ax																
Bx																
Cx																
Dx																
Ex																
Fx																

=== Character set 0x22: Symbols 2 - Japanese and mathematical symbols ===
XCCS (prefixed with 0x22)
	0	1	2	3	4	5	6	7	8	9	A	B	C	D	E	F
0x																
1x																
2x		◆	□	■	△	▲	▽	▼	※	〒	→	←	↑	↓	〓	
3x											∈	∋	⊆	⊇	⊂	⊃
4x	∪	∩									∧	∨	¬	⇒	⇔	∀
5x	∃												∠	⊥	⌒	∂
6x	∇	≡	≒	≪	≫	√	∽	∝	∵	∫	∬					
7x			Å	‰	♯	♭	♩	†	‡	¶					◯	
8x																
9x																
Ax																
Bx																
Cx																
Dx																
Ex																
Fx																

=== Character set 0x23: Extended Latin alphabet ===
XCCS (prefixed with 0x23)
	0	1	2	3	4	5	6	7	8	9	A	B	C	D	E	F
0x																
1x																
2x																
3x																
4x																
5x																
6x																
7x																
8x																
9x																
Ax																
Bx																
Cx																
Dx							̣									
Ex																
Fx																

=== Character set 0x24: (Top) Japanese hiragana syllabary (Bottom) Chinese Bo-po-mo-fo ===
XCCS (prefixed with 0x24)
	0	1	2	3	4	5	6	7	8	9	A	B	C	D	E	F
0x																
1x																
2x		ぁ	あ	ぃ	い	ぅ	う	ぇ	え	ぉ	お	か	が	き	ぎ	く
3x	ぐ	け	げ	こ	ご	さ	ざ	し	じ	す	ず	せ	ぜ	そ	ぞ	た
4x	だ	ち	ぢ	っ	つ	づ	て	で	と	ど	な	に	ぬ	ね	の	は
5x	ば	ぱ	ひ	び	ぴ	ふ	ぶ	ぷ	へ	べ	ぺ	ほ	ぼ	ぱ	ま	み
6x	む	め	も	ゃ	や	ゅ	ゆ	ょ	よ	ら	り	る	れ	ろ	ゎ	わ
7x	ゐ	ゑ	を	ん												
8x																
9x																
Ax																
Bx																
Cx																
Dx																
Ex																
Fx																

=== Character set 0x25: Japanese katakana syllabary ===
XCCS (prefixed with 0x25)
	0	1	2	3	4	5	6	7	8	9	A	B	C	D	E	F
0x																
1x																
2x		ァ	ア	ィ	イ	ゥ	ウ	ェ	エ	ォ	オ	カ	ガ	キ	ギ	ク
3x	グ	ケ	ゲ	コ	ゴ	サ	ザ	シ	ジ	ス	ズ	セ	ゼ	ソ	ゾ	タ
4x	ダ	チ	ヂ	ッ	ツ	ヅ	テ	デ	ト	ド	ナ	ニ	ヌ	ネ	ノ	ハ
5x	バ	パ	ヒ	ビ	ピ	フ	ブ	プ	ヘ	ベ	ペ	ホ	ボ	ポ	マ	ミ
6x	ム	メ	モ	ャ	ヤ	ュ	ユ	ョ	ヨ	ラ	リ	ル	レ	ロ	ヮ	ワ
7x	ヰ	ヱ	ヲ	ン												
8x																
9x																
Ax																
Bx																
Cx																
Dx																
Ex																
Fx																

=== Character set 0x26: Greek alphabet ===
XCCS (prefixed with 0x26)
	0	1	2	3	4	5	6	7	8	9	A	B	C	D	E	F
0x																
1x																
2x		Α	Β	Γ	Δ	Ε	Ζ	Η	Θ	Ι	Κ	Λ	Μ	Ν	Ξ	Ο
3x	Π	Ρ	Σ	Τ	Υ	Φ	Χ	Ψ	Ω							;
4x		α	β	γ	δ	ε	ζ	η	θ	ι	κ	λ	μ	ν	ξ	ο
5x	π	ρ	σ	τ	υ	φ	χ	ψ	ω							
6x																
7x								ς								
8x																
9x																
Ax																
Bx					΄	΅										
Cx																
Dx																
Ex																
Fx																

=== Character set 0x27: Cyrillic alphabet ===
XCCS (prefixed with 0x27)
	0	1	2	3	4	5	6	7	8	9	A	B	C	D	E	F
0x																
1x																
2x		А	Б	В	Г	Д	Е	Ё	Ж	З	И	Й	К	Л	М	Н
3x	О	П	Р	С	Т	У	Ф	Х	Ц	Ч	Ш	Щ	Ъ	Ы	Ь	Э
4x	Ю	Я														
5x		а	б	в	г	д	е	ё	ж	з	и	й	к	л	м	н
6x	о	п	р	с	т	у	ф	х	ц	ч	ш	щ	ъ	ы	ь	э
7x	ю	я														
8x																
9x																
Ax																
Bx																
Cx																
Dx																
Ex																
Fx																

=== Character set 0x28: (Top) JIS and IBM forms characters (Bottom) Mosaic characters ===
XCCS (prefixed with 0x28)
	0	1	2	3	4	5	6	7	8	9	A	B	C	D	E	F
0x																
1x																
2x		│	─	┐	┌	└	┘	┤	┬	├	┴	┼	━	┃	┏	┓
3x	┗	┛	┫	┳	┣	┻	╋	┠	┯	┨	┷	┿	┝	┰	┥	┷
4x	╂															
5x																
6x																
7x																
8x																
9x																
Ax																
Bx																
Cx																
Dx																
Ex																
Fx																

=== Character set 0x30 ===
XCCS (prefixed with 0x30)
	0	1	2	3	4	5	6	7	8	9	A	B	C	D	E	F
0x																
1x																
2x		亜	唖	娃	阿	哀	愛	挨	姶	逢	葵	茛	穐	悪	握	湅
3x	旭	葦	芦	鯵	梓	圧	斡	扱	宛	姐	虻	飴	絢	綾	鮎	或
4x	粟	袷	安	庵	按	暗	案	闇	鞍	杏	以	伊	位	依	偉	囲
5x	夷	委	威	尉	悿	意	慰	易	椅	為	畏	異	禿	維	緯	胃
6x	萎	衣	謂	違	遺	医	井	亥	育	域	郁	碿	一	壱	溢	逸
7x	稲	茨	芋	鰯	允	印	咽	員	因	姻	引	飲	淫	胤	蔭	
8x																
9x																
Ax																
Bx																
Cx																
Dx																
Ex																
Fx																

=== Character set 0x31 ===
XCCS (prefixed with 0x31)
	0	1	2	3	4	5	6	7	8	9	A	B	C	D	E	F
0x																
1x																
2x		院	陰	隠	韻	吋	右	宇	烏	羽	迂	雨	卯	鵜	窺	丑
3x	碓	臼	渦	嘘	唄	欝	蔚	鰻	姥	厩	浦	瓜	閏	噂	云	運
4x	雲	荏	餌	叡	営	嬰	影	映	曳	栄	永	泳	洩	瑛	盈	穎
5x	頴	英	衛	詠	鋭	液	疫	益	駅	悦	謁	越	閲	榎	厭	円
6x	園	堰	奄	宴	延	怨	掩	援	沿	演	炎	焔	煙	燕	猿	縁
7x	艶	苑	薗	遠	鉛	鴛	塩	於	汚	甥	凹	央	奥	往	応	
8x																
9x																
Ax																
Bx																
Cx																
Dx																
Ex																
Fx																

=== Character set 0xE0 ===
XCCS (prefixed with 0xE0)
	0	1	2	3	4	5	6	7	8	9	A	B	C	D	E	F
0x																
1x																
2x																
3x																
4x																
5x																
6x		א	ב	ג	ד	ה	ו	ז	ח	ט	י	ך	כ	ל	ם	מ
7x	ן	נ	ס	ע	ף	פ	ץ	צ	ק	ר	ש	ת				
8x																
9x																
Ax																
Bx																
Cx																
Dx																
Ex																
Fx																

=== Character set 0xE1 ===
XCCS (prefixed with 0xE1)
	0	1	2	3	4	5	6	7	8	9	A	B	C	D	E	F
0x																
1x																
2x																
3x																
4x		ء	آ	أ	ؤ	إ	ئ	ا	ب	ة	ت	ث	ج	ح	خ	د
5x	ذ	ر	ز	س	ش	ص	ض	ط	ظ	ع	غ					
6x	ـ	ف	ق	ك	ل	م	ن	ه	و	ى	ي	ً	ٌ	ٍ	َ	ُ
7x	ِ	ّ	ْ	ٓ	ٔ	ٕ	ٖ	ٗ	٘	ٙ	ٚ					
8x																
9x																
Ax																
Bx																
Cx																
Dx																
Ex																
Fx																

=== Character set 0xE2 ===
XCCS (prefixed with 0xE2)
	0	1	2	3	4	5	6	7	8	9	A	B	C	D	E	F
0x																
1x																
2x																
3x																
4x																
5x																
6x																
7x																
8x																
9x																
Ax																
Bx																
Cx																
Dx												j	ʎ	ŋ	k	ɡ
Ex	x	ɣ	ɰ	g	ɴ	ƞ	q	ɢ	χ	ʁ	ʀ	ħ	ʕ	ʔ	h	ɦ
Fx																

=== Character set 0xE3 ===
XCCS (prefixed with 0xE3)
	0	1	2	3	4	5	6	7	8	9	A	B	C	D	E	F
0x																
1x																
2x																
3x																
4x																
5x																
6x																
7x																
8x																
9x																
Ax			￦													
Bx																
Cx		ﾡ	ﾢ	ﾣ	ﾤ	ﾥ	ﾦ	ﾧ	ﾨ	ﾩ	ﾪ	ﾫ	ﾬ	ﾭ	ﾮ	ﾯ
Dx	ﾰ	ﾱ	ﾲ	ﾳ	ﾴ	ﾵ	ﾶ	ﾷ	ﾸ	ﾹ	ﾺ	ﾻ	ﾼ	ﾽ	ﾾ	HCF
Ex			ￂ	ￃ	ￄ	ￅ	ￆ	ￇ			ￊ	ￋ	ￌ	ￍ	ￎ	ￏ
Fx			ￒ	ￓ	ￔ	ￕ	ￖ	ￗ			ￚ	ￛ	ￜ	HVF		

=== Character set 0xEE ===
XCCS (prefixed with 0xEE)
	0	1	2	3	4	5	6	7	8	9	A	B	C	D	E	F
0x																
1x																
2x	NBSP	3/MSP	4/MSP	HSP	PSP	ENSP	EMSP	FSP							.	
3x																
4x																
5x																
6x																
7x				⌈/⎡	⌊/⎣		⌉/⎤	⌋/⎦					|		∼	
8x																
9x																
Ax			․	‥	…											
Bx																
Cx																
Dx																
Ex	⎫	⎪	⎬	⎭	⎧	⎩	⎨	⎪								
Fx																

=== Character set 0xEF ===
XCCS (prefixed with 0xEF)
	0	1	2	3	4	5	6	7	8	9	A	B	C	D	E	F
0x																
1x																
2x		∝	∞					'	⊥	⊤	⋆				∙/⋅	∕
3x	†	‡	〈	〉	☞		⊢	⊣	⊨	⫤	≈	∈	↖	↘	↗	↙
4x	℅	‰	≪	≫	≮	≯	∣	∤	∥	∦	∌	∉	∋	⇐	↔	⇒
5x	⇋	⇄		↝	∊	∍	∩	∪	⊇	⊆	⊃	⊂	⊉	⊈	⊅	⊄
6x	⊐	⊏	⊕	⊖	⊗	⊘	•	∘	ℏ	∅	¬	¦	∠	∢	∟	∵
7x	≐	≘	≡	≢	≟	≙	≂	≃	≅	≊	∫	∮	√	∓	∔	
8x																
9x																
Ax			ƒ	₣				ℵ	№		ℚ	ℍ	ℂ	ℕ	ℝ	ℤ
Bx			∃	∄	ℓ	∀	∧	∨	∎	∇	∂		☎	⤸		
Cx																✓
Dx																
Ex	∑	∏			│	─	┼									
Fx		∐												⅓	⅔	

=== Character set 0xF0 ===
XCCS (prefixed with 0xF0)
	0	1	2	3	4	5	6	7	8	9	A	B	C	D	E	F
0x																
1x																
2x		ﬀ	ﬃ	ﬄ	ﬁ	ﬂ										
3x																
4x																
5x																
6x																
7x																
8x																
9x																
Ax																
Bx																
Cx																
Dx																
Ex																
Fx																

=== Character set 0xF1 ===
XCCS (prefixed with 0xF1)
	0	1	2	3	4	5	6	7	8	9	A	B	C	D	E	F
0x																
1x																
2x		Á	À	Â	É	Ü	Î	Ä	Å	Ó	Ò	Ú	Ù	Ç	Í	Ì
3x	Æ	Ø	Œ													
4x																
5x					Ö											
6x																
7x																
8x																
9x																
Ax		á	à	â	é	ü	î	ä	å	ó	ò	ú	ù	ç	í	ì
Bx	æ	ø	œ													
Cx																
Dx					ö											
Ex																
Fx																

== See also ==
- Interscript
- Lotus Multi-Byte Character Set (LMBCS)
