= Code page 1008 =

Character encoding

Code page 1008 (CCSIDs 1008 and 5104), also known as ISO 8-bit Arabic, is used by IBM in its AIX operating system.

== Code page layout ==
Code page 1008
| | 0 | 1 | 2 | 3 | 4 | 5 | 6 | 7 | 8 | 9 | A | B | C | D | E | F |
|---|---|---|---|---|---|---|---|---|---|---|---|---|---|---|---|---|
| 2x | SP | ! | " | # | $ | ٪ | & | ' | ( | ) | ٭ | + | , | - | . | / |
| 3x | 0 | 1 | 2 | 3 | 4 | 5 | 6 | 7 | 8 | 9 | : | ; | < | = | > | ? |
| 4x | @ | A | B | C | D | E | F | G | H | I | J | K | L | M | N | O |
| 5x | P | Q | R | S | T | U | V | W | X | Y | Z | [ | \ | ] | | _ |
| 6x | ` | a | b | c | d | e | f | g | h | i | j | k | l | m | n | o |
| 7x | p | q | r | s | t | u | v | w | x | y | z | { | | | } | ~ | |
| 8x | | | | | | | | | | | | | | | | |
| 9x | | | | | | | | | | | | | | | | |
| Ax | NBSP | ، | ¢ | ؛ | ؟ | ّ | ¦ | ﹽ | ـ | ﹳ | ء | آ | ¬ | SHY | ﺂ | أ |
| Bx | ٠ | ١ | ٢ | ٣ | ٤ | ٥ | ٦ | ٧ | ٨ | ٩ | ﺄ | ؤ | ئ | ﺍ | ﺎ | ب |
| Cx | ﺑ | ة | ت | ﺗ | ث | ﺛ | ج | ﺟ | ح | ﺣ | خ | ﺧ | د | ذ | ر | ز |
| Dx | س | ﺳ | ش | ﺷ | ص | ﺻ | ض | × | ﺿ | ط | ظ | ع | ﻊ | ﻋ | ﻌ | غ |
| Ex | ﻎ | ﻏ | ﻐ | ف | ﻓ | ق | ﻗ | ك | ﻛ | ل | ﻵ | ﻶ | ﻷ | ﻸ | ﻻ | ﻼ |
| Fx | ﻟ | م | ﻣ | ن | ﻧ | ه | ﻫ | ÷ | ﻬ | و | ى | ﻰ | ي | ﻲ | ﻳ | € |
