= Code page 864 =

Code page used to write Arabic

- MIME / IANA: IBM864
- Alias(es): cp864

Code page 864 (CCSID 864) (also known as CP 864, IBM 00864) is a code page used to write Arabic in Egypt, Iraq, Jordan, Saudi Arabia, and Syria.

CCSID 17248 is the euro currency update of code page/CCSID 864. The euro sign was assigned to the previously undefined code point A7_{hex} in 1999.

== Character set ==
The following table shows code page 864. Each character is shown with its equivalent Unicode code point.

Code page 864
	0	1	2	3	4	5	6	7	8	9	A	B	C	D	E	F
0x	NUL	☺	♪	♫	☼	═	║	╬	╣	╦	╠	╩	╗	╔	╚	╝
1x	►	◄	↕	‼	¶	§	▬	↨	↑	↓	→	←	∟	↔	▲	▼
2x	SP	!	"	#	$	٪	&	'	(	)	٭	+	,	-	.	/
3x	0	1	2	3	4	5	6	7	8	9	:	;	<	=	>	?
4x	@	A	B	C	D	E	F	G	H	I	J	K	L	M	N	O
5x	P	Q	R	S	T	U	V	W	X	Y	Z	[	\	]		_
6x	`	a	b	c	d	e	f	g	h	i	j	k	l	m	n	o
7x	p	q	r	s	t	u	v	w	x	y	z	{	|	}	~	⌂
8x	°	·	∙	√	▒	─	│	┼	┤	┬	├	┴	┐	┌	└	┘
9x	β	∞	φ	±	½	¼	≈	«	»	ﻷ	ﻸ			ﻻ	ﻼ	ﹳ
Ax	NBSP	SHY	ﺂ	£	¤	ﺄ		€	ﺎ	ﺏ	ﺕ	ﺙ	،	ﺝ	ﺡ	ﺥ
Bx	٠	١	٢	٣	٤	٥	٦	٧	٨	٩	ﻑ	؛	ﺱ	ﺵ	ﺹ	؟
Cx	¢	ﺀ	ﺁ	ﺃ	ﺅ	ﻊ	ﺋ	ﺍ	ﺑ	ﺓ	ﺗ	ﺛ	ﺟ	ﺣ	ﺧ	ﺩ
Dx	ﺫ	ﺭ	ﺯ	ﺳ	ﺷ	ﺻ	ﺿ	ﻁ	ﻅ	ﻋ	ﻏ	¦	¬	÷	×	ﻉ
Ex	ـ	ﻓ	ﻗ	ﻛ	ﻟ	ﻣ	ﻧ	ﻫ	ﻭ	ﻯ	ﻳ	ﺽ	ﻌ	ﻎ	ﻍ	ﻡ
Fx	ﹽ	_ّ	ﻥ	ﻩ	ﻬ	ﻰ	ﻲ	ﻐ	ﻕ	ﻵ	ﻶ	ﻝ	ﻙ	ﻱ	■	

== Code page 165 ==
Code page 165 adds characters in the five empty spots in the original code page 864. This code page is used by ADOS.

Code page 165
	0	1	2	3	4	5	6	7	8	9	A	B	C	D	E	F
8x	°	·	∙	√	▒	─	│	┼	┤	┬	├	┴	┐	┌	└	┘
9x	β	∞	φ	±	½	¼	≈	«	»	ﻷ	ﻸ	ﻹ	ﻺ	ﻻ	ﻼ	ﹳ
Ax	NBSP	SHY	ﺂ	£	¤	ﺄ	ﺇ	ﺈ	ﺎ	ﺏ	ﺕ	ﺙ	،	ﺝ	ﺡ	ﺥ
Bx	٠	١	٢	٣	٤	٥	٦	٧	٨	٩	ﻑ	؛	ﺱ	ﺵ	ﺹ	؟
Cx	¢	ﺀ	ﺁ	ﺃ	ﺅ	ﻊ	ﺋ	ﺍ	ﺑ	ﺓ	ﺗ	ﺛ	ﺟ	ﺣ	ﺧ	ﺩ
Dx	ﺫ	ﺭ	ﺯ	ﺳ	ﺷ	ﺻ	ﺿ	ﻁ	ﻅ	ﻋ	ﻏ	¦	¬	÷	×	ﻉ
Ex	ـ	ﻓ	ﻗ	ﻛ	ﻟ	ﻣ	ﻧ	ﻫ	ﻭ	ﻯ	ﻳ	ﺽ	ﻌ	ﻎ	ﻍ	ﻡ
Fx	ﹽ	_ّ	ﻥ	ﻩ	ﻬ	ﻰ	ﻲ	ﻐ	ﻕ	ﻵ	ﻶ	ﻝ	ﻙ	ﻱ	■	NBSP
