= Dagger alif =

Form of the Arabic letter alif

Alif maqṣūra with alif khanjariah above it, often used in Egypt, Sudan, Iran, and various other countries to distinguish it from the dotless yā (ی).

ــٰ

The dagger alif (Arabic: ألف خنجرية alif khanjariyya) or superscript alif is written as a short vertical stroke on top of an Arabic letter. It indicates a long /aː/ sound where an alif is normally not written, e.g. هَٰذَا hādhā or رَحْمَٰن raḥmān. The dagger alif occurs in only a few modern words, but these include some common ones. It is rarely written, however, even in fully vocalised texts, except in the Qur'an. As Wright notes "[alif] was at first more rarely marked than the other long vowels, and hence it happens that, at a later period, after the invention of the vowel-points, it was indicated in some very common words merely by a fatḥa [i.e. the dagger alif.]" Most keyboards do not have the dagger alif. The word الله (Allāh) is usually produced automatically by entering "alif lām lām hāʾ"; or in Arabic "ا ل ل ه". The word consists of alif + ligature of doubled lām with a shadda and a dagger alif above lām.

== With fatḥah ==
There are two possible ways of representing the dagger alif in modern editions of Quran. In the editions printed in the Middle East, the dagger alif is written with fatḥah: الرَّحْمَٰنِ (a)r-raḥmāni. In the editions printed in Türkiye and South Asia (Pakistan, India and Bangladesh), the dagger alif is written without fatḥah: الرَّحْمٰنِ (a)r-raḥmāni.

== See also ==
- Arabic diacritics
