= Mimation =

Feature in some Semitic languages

Mimation (Arabic: تَمْيِيم, tamyīm) is the phenomenon of a suffixed -m (the letter mem in many Semitic abjads) which occurs in some Semitic languages.

This occurs in Akkadian in singular nouns. It was also present in the Proto-Semitic language.

It is retained in the plural and dual forms in Hebrew. It corresponds to the letter nun (-n) in Classical Arabic and is retained in the singular (nunation), dual, and plural.

== See also ==
- Nunation
