= Interscript =

Rich text document markup language designed by Xerox

Interscript was a rich text document markup language designed by Xerox to act as a common interchange format between disparate document formats. It was part of a system that included the Xerox Character Code Standard (XCCS) and the InterPress page description representation.
