= Final form =

Character used to represent a letter at the end of a word

In certain languages, the final form or terminal form is a special character used to represent a letter only when it occurs at the end of a word. Some languages that use final form characters are: Arabic, Hebrew, Manchu and one letter in Greek (ς).

The lowercase Latin letter "s" had separate medial (ſ) and final (s) in the orthographies of many European languages from the medieval period to the early 19th century; it survived in the German Fraktur script until the 1940s.

== Hebrew ==
In the Hebrew alphabet the final form is called sofit (Hebrew: סופית, meaning "final" or "ending").

Hebrew letters that have a final form
Letter name	Non-final	Final (sofit)
Mem	מ	ם
Nun	נ	ן
Tsadi	צ	ץ
Pe	פ	ף
Kaf	כ	ך

This set of letters is known acronymically as אותיות מנצפ"ך (otiyot menetzepekh, 'MNTzPK letters').

The now final forms ן ץ ף ך predate their non-final counterparts; They were the default forms used in any position within a word. Their descender eventually bent forwards when preceding another letter to facilitate writing. A final form of these letters is also called pshuta (פשוטה, meaning extended or plain).

The letter Mem also had a descender 𐡌, however, its current final form ם was a variant of מ used interchangeably in all positions. The standardization is mentioned in the Babylonian Talmud (Megillah 2b-3a and Shabbas 104a). One instance of a medial ם is preserved in Isaiah 9:6 of the Hebrew Bible, while Nehemiah 2:13 and arguably Genesis 49:19–20 have a final מ.

Modern Hebrew uses the forms פ כ finally, when transcribing a plosive pronunciation, for example מיקרוסקופ (microscope), מובארכ (Mubarak, مبارك), while their final forms ף ך, are transcribing a fricative pronunciation, for example כך (Kach), שף (Chef).
