= Arabic machine translation =

Arabic is one of the major languages that have been given attention by machine translation (MT) researchers since the very early days of MT and specifically in the U.S. The language has been considered "due to its morphological, syntactic, phonetic and phonological properties [to be] one of the most difficult languages for written and spoken language processing."
