= Nunation =

Type of Arabic diacritic

Nunation (Arabic: تَنوِين, tanwīn), in some Semitic languages such as Arabic, is the addition of one of three diacritics (cf. ḥarakāt) to a noun or adjective in order to indicate that the word ends in a sequence of a vowel and an alveolar nasal (English 'n'). Thus, the presence of a consonant is exceptionally expressed without the addition of the corresponding letter (which otherwise normally would have been nūn). The sequences marked by the diacritics represent case endings (nominative, accusative and genitive). The noun phrase is fully declinable and syntactically unmarked for definiteness, identifiable in speech.

== Literary Arabic ==
When writing Literary Arabic in full diacritics, there are three nunation diacritics, which indicate the suffixes -un (IPA: /-un/) (nominative case), -in /-in/ (genitive), and -an /an/ (accusative). The orthographical rules for nunation with the fatḥah sign ـً is by an additional ا alif (اً, diacritic above alif; or ـًا, diacritic before alif; see below), above ةً (tāʾ marbūṭah تاء مربوطة) or above ءً (hamzah همزة).

In most dialects of spoken Arabic, nunation only exists in words and phrases borrowed from the literary language, especially those that are declined in the accusative (that is, with -an). It is still used in some Bedouin dialects in its genitive form -in, such as in Najdi Arabic.

Since Arabic has no indefinite article, nouns that are nunated (except for proper nouns) are indefinite, and so the absence of the definite article ʼal triggers nunation in all nouns and substantives except diptotes (that is, derivations with only two cases in the indefinite state, -u in the nominative and -a in the accusative and genitive). A given name, if it is not a diptote, is also nunated when declined, as in أَشْهَدُ أَنَّ مُحَمَّدًا رَسُولُ الله (ashhadu anna Muḥammadan rasūlu l-lāh(i) /ʔaʃ.ha.du ʔan.na mu.ħam.ma.dan ra.suː.lul.laː(.hi)/ "I bear witness that Muhammad is the messenger of Allah."), in which the word محمد Muḥammad, a given name derived from the passive participle of حَمَّدَ ("to praise"), is nunated to مُحَمَّدًا Muḥammadan to signal that it is in the accusative case, as it is the grammatical subject of a sentence introduced by أنَّ ("that").

Nunation - tanwīn تَنْوِين
Symbol	ـٌ (Note: In teaching and in handwriting, it looks like actual two ḍammah symbols: U+08F1 ࣱ ARABIC OPEN DAMMATAN.)	ـٍ	ـً
Transliteration	-un	-in	-an
Case	Nom	Gen	Acc
Example on the word بيت bayt	بيتٌ	بيتٍ	بيتًا
Transliteration	baytun	baytin	baytan
Example on the word دودة dūdah	دودةٌ	دودةٍ	دودةً
Transliteration	dūdatun	dūdatin	dūdatan
Example on the word هدوء hudūʼ	هدوءٌ	هدوءٍ	هدوءًا
Transliteration	hudūʼun	hudūʼin	hudūʼan

In Levantine Arabic, it is standard to write fatḥatān on the alif, rather than on the previous letter: بيتاً - هدوءاً

== Xiao'erjing ==
Xiao'erjing is a Perso-Arabic script adopted for writing of Sinitic languages such as Mandarin (especially the Lanyin, Zhongyuan and Northeastern dialects) or the Dungan language. This writing system is unique (compared to other Arabic-based writing systems) in that all vowels, long and short, are explicitly marked at all times with Arabic diacritics. In this script, the three nunations are used extensively to represent the alveolar (front) nasal sounds ("-n"), and also sometimes to represent velar (back) nasal sounds ("-ng").

Nunation - tanwīn
Symbol	ـًا	ـٌ	ـٍ	ْـٍ
Transliteration	-an	-un	-en	-eng
Example on a word	بًا	جٌ	مٍ	مٍْ
Chinese Character	半	准	们	梦
Pinyin	bàn	zhǔn	mén	mèng

== Akkadian language ==
Nunation may also refer to the -n ending of duals in Akkadian (until it was dropped in the Old Babylonian period).

== Character encodings ==
Character information
Preview	ً		ٌ		ٍ		ࣰ		ࣱ		ࣲ	
Unicode name	ARABIC FATHATAN		ARABIC DAMMATAN		ARABIC KASRATAN		ARABIC OPEN FATHATAN		ARABIC OPEN DAMMATAN		ARABIC OPEN KASRATAN	
Encodings	decimal	hex	dec	hex	dec	hex	dec	hex	dec	hex	dec	hex
Unicode	1611	U+064B	1612	U+064C	1613	U+064D	2288	U+08F0	2289	U+08F1	2290	U+08F2
UTF-8	217 139	D9 8B	217 140	D9 8C	217 141	D9 8D	224 163 176	E0 A3 B0	224 163 177	E0 A3 B1	224 163 178	E0 A3 B2
Numeric character reference	&#1611;	&#x64B;	&#1612;	&#x64C;	&#1613;	&#x64D;	&#2288;	&#x8F0;	&#2289;	&#x8F1;	&#2290;	&#x8F2;

== See also ==
- Arabic diacritics
- Mimation
- iʿrāb
