= Vertical bar =

Typographic symbol

|o

Vertical bar
- In Unicode: U+007C | VERTICAL LINE (&verbar;, &vert;, &VerticalLine;)

Related
- See also: U+00A6 ¦ BROKEN BAR (&brvbar;) U+2016 ‖ DOUBLE VERTICAL LINE (&Verbar;, &Vert;) U+2223 ∣ DIVIDES

The vertical bar, |, is a glyph with various uses in mathematics, computing, and typography. It has many names, often related to particular meanings: Sheffer stroke (in logic), pipe, bar, or (literally, the word "or"), vbar, and others.

== Usage ==
=== Mathematics ===
The vertical bar is used as a mathematical symbol in numerous ways. If used as a pair of brackets, it suggests the notion of size. These are:

- absolute value: $|x|$, read "the absolute value of x"
- cardinality: $|S|$, read "the cardinality of the set S" or "the length of a string S"
- determinant: $|A|$, read "the determinant of the matrix A". When the matrix entries are written out, the determinant is denoted by surrounding the matrix entries by vertical bars instead of the usual brackets or parentheses of the matrix, as in
  $$\begin{vmatrix} a & b \\ c & d\end{vmatrix}$$.
- order: $|G|$, read "the order of the group G", or $|g|$, "the order of the element $g \in G$"

A single vertical bar is also used in many different ways:

- conditional probability: $P(X|Y)$, read "the probability of X given Y"
- distance: $P|ab$, denoting the shortest distance between point $P$ to line $ab$, so line $P|ab$ is perpendicular to line $ab$
- divisibility: $a \mid b$, read "a divides b" or "a is a factor of b", though Unicode also provides special 'divides' and 'does not divide' symbols (U+2223 ∣ DIVIDES and U+2224 ∤ DOES NOT DIVIDE)
- function evaluation: $f(x)|_{x=4}$, read "f of x, evaluated at x equals 4" (see subscripts at Wikibooks)
- restriction: $f|_{A}$, denoting the restriction of the function $f$, with a domain that is a superset of $A$, to just $A$
- set-builder notation: $\{x|x<2\}$, read "the set of x such that x is less than two". Often, a colon ':' is used instead of a vertical bar
- the Sheffer stroke in logic: $a|b$, read "a nand b"
- subtraction: $f(x) \vert _a ^b$, read "f(x) from a to b", denoting $f(b) - f(a)$. Used in the context of a definite integral with variable x.
- A vertical bar can be used to separate variables from fixed parameters in a function, for example $f(x|\mu,\sigma)$, or in the notation for elliptic integrals.

The double vertical bar, $\|$, is also employed in mathematics.

- Parallelism: $AB \parallel CD$; reads "the line $AB$ is parallel to the line $CD$"
- Norm: $\|A\|$; reads "the norm (length, size, magnitude etc.) of the matrix $A$". The norm of a one-dimensional vector is the absolute value and single bars are used.
- Propositional truncation (a type former that truncates a type down to a mere proposition in homotopy type theory): for any $a : A$ (read "term $a$ of type $A$") we have $|a| : \left\| A \right\|$ (here $|a|$ reads "image of $a : A$ in $\left\| A \right\|$" and $|a| : \left\| A \right\|$ reads "propositional truncation of $A$")
- Integer complexity: $\|n\|$; reads "the complexity of the integer n".

In LaTeX mathematical mode, the ASCII vertical bar produces a vertical line, and \| creates a double vertical line (a | b \| c is set as $a | b \| c$). This has different spacing from \mid and \parallel, which are relational operators: a \mid b \parallel c is set as $a \mid b \parallel c$. See below about LaTeX in text mode.

=== Chemistry ===
In chemistry, the vertical line is used in cell notation of electrochemical cells.

Example,

Zn | Zn^{2+} || Cu^{2+} | Cu

Single vertical lines show components of the cell which do not mix, usually being in different phases. The double vertical line ( || ) is used to represent the salt bridge, which is used to maintain electrical neutrality within the electrochemical cell.

=== Physics ===
The vertical bar is used in bra–ket notation in quantum physics. Examples:

- $|\psi\rangle$: the quantum physical state $\psi$
- $\langle\psi|$: the dual state corresponding to the state above
- $\langle\psi|\rho\rangle$: the inner product of states $\psi$ and $\rho$
- Supergroups in physics are denoted G(N|M), which reads "G, M vertical bar N"; here G denotes any supergroup, M denotes the bosonic dimensions, and N denotes the Grassmann dimensions.

=== Computing ===
==== Pipe ====
A pipe is an inter-process communication mechanism originating in Unix, which directs the output (standard out and, optionally, standard error) of one process to the input (standard in) of another. In this way, a series of commands can be "piped" together, giving users the ability to quickly perform complex multi-stage processing from the command line or as part of a Unix shell script ("bash file"). In most Unix shells (command interpreters), this is represented by the vertical bar character. For example:

grep -i 'blair' filename.log | more

where the output from the grep process (all lines containing 'blair') is piped to the more process (which allows a command line user to read through results one page at a time).

The same "pipe" feature has been adopted in other operating systems.

This usage has led to the character itself being called "pipe".

==== Disjunction ====
In many programming languages, the vertical bar is used to designate the logic operation or, either bitwise or or logical or.

Specifically, in C and other languages following C syntax conventions, such as C++, Perl, Java and C#, a | b denotes a bitwise or; whereas a double vertical bar a || b denotes a (short-circuited) logical or. Since the character was originally not available in all code pages and keyboard layouts, ANSI C can transcribe it in form of the trigraph ??!, which, outside string literals, is equivalent to the | character.

In regular expression syntax, the vertical bar again indicates logical or (alternation). For example: the Unix command grep -E 'fu|bar' matches lines containing 'fu' or 'bar'.

==== Concatenation ====
The double vertical bar operator "||" denotes string concatenation in PL/I, REXX, ooRexx, standard ANSI SQL, and theoretical computer science (particularly cryptography).

==== Delimiter ====
Although not as common as commas or tabs, the vertical bar can be used as a delimiter in a flat file. Examples of a pipe-delimited standard data format are LEDES 1998B and HL7. It is frequently used because vertical bars are typically uncommon in the data itself.

Similarly, the vertical bar may see use as a delimiter for regular expression operations (e.g. in sed). This is useful when the regular expression contains instances of the more common forward slash (/) delimiter; using a vertical bar eliminates the need to escape all instances of the forward slash. However, this makes the bar unusable as the regular expression "alternative" operator.

==== Backus–Naur form ====
In Backus–Naur form, an expression consists of sequences of symbols and/or sequences separated by '|', indicating a choice, the whole being a possible substitution for the symbol on the left.

<personal-name> ::= <name> | <initial>

==== Concurrency operator ====
In calculi of communicating processes (like pi-calculus), the vertical bar is used to indicate that processes execute in parallel.

==== APL ====
The pipe in APL is the modulo or residue function between two operands and the absolute value function next to one operand.

==== List comprehensions ====
The vertical bar is used for list comprehensions in some functional languages, e.g. Haskell and Erlang. Compare set-builder notation.

==== Text markup ====
The vertical bar is used as a special character in lightweight markup languages, notably MediaWiki's Wikitext (in the templates and internal links).

In LaTeX text mode, the vertical bar produces an em dash (—). The \textbar command can be used to produce a vertical bar.

==== Closures ====
The vertical bar is used to denote closures certain languages such as Ruby and Rust.

=== Phonetics and orthography ===
In the Khoisan languages and the International Phonetic Alphabet, the vertical bar is used to write the dental click (ǀ). A double vertical bar is used to write the alveolar lateral click (ǁ). Since these are technically letters, they have their own Unicode code points in the Latin Extended-B range: U+01C0 ǀ LATIN LETTER DENTAL CLICK and U+01C1 ǁ LATIN LETTER LATERAL CLICK.

Some Northwest and Northeast Caucasian languages written in the Cyrillic script have a vertical bar called palochka (Russian: палочка, lit. 'little stick'), indicating the preceding consonant is an ejective.

Longer single and double vertical bars are used to mark prosodic boundaries in the IPA, being | (minor (foot) boundary symbol), with a major boundary being indicated with two bars, conventionally ‖ (U+2016 ‖ DOUBLE VERTICAL LINE).

=== Literature ===
In medieval European manuscripts, a single vertical bar was a common variant of the virgula / used as a comma, or caesura mark.

In Sanskrit and other Indian languages, a single vertical mark,।, called a danda, has a similar function as a period (full stop). Two bars,॥, (a 'double danda') is the equivalent of a pilcrow in marking the end of a stanza, paragraph or section. The danda has its own Unicode code point, U+0964 । DEVANAGARI DANDA; as does the double danda: U+0965 ॥ DEVANAGARI DOUBLE DANDA.

==== Poetry ====
A double vertical bar ⟨||⟩ or ⟨‖⟩ is the standard caesura mark in English literary criticism and analysis. It marks the strong break or caesura common to many forms of poetry, particularly Old English verse. It is also traditionally used to mark the division between lines of verse printed as prose (the style preferred by Oxford University Press), though it is now often replaced by the forward slash.

==== Notation ====
In the Geneva Bible and early printings of the King James Version, a double vertical bar is used to mark margin notes that contain an alternative translation from the original text. These margin notes always begin with the conjunction "or". In later printings of the King James Version, the double vertical bar is irregularly used to mark any comment in the margins.

A double vertical bar symbol may be used to call out a footnote. (The traditional order of these symbols in English is *, †, ‡, §, ‖, ¶, so its use is very rare; in modern usage, numbers and letters are preferred for endnotes and footnotes.)

==== Music scoring ====
In music, when writing chord sheets, single vertical bars associated with a colon (|: A / / / :|) represents the beginning and end of a section (e.g. Intro, Interlude, Verse, Chorus) of music. Single bars can also represent the beginning and end of measures (|: A / / / | D / / / | E / / / :|). A double vertical bar associated with a colon can represent the repeat of a given section (||: A / / / :|| - play twice).

== Broken bar ==
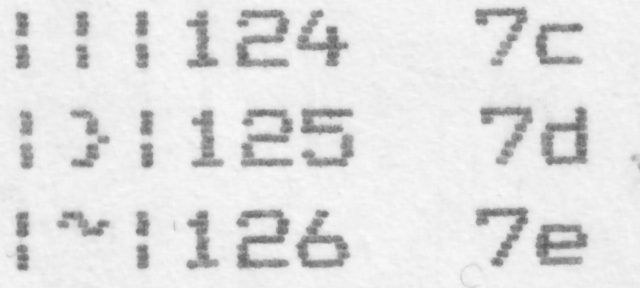
The code point 124 (7C hexadecimal) is occupied by a broken bar in a dot matrix printer of the late 1980s, which apparently lacks a solid vertical bar. See the full picture.

Many early video terminals and dot-matrix printers rendered the vertical bar character as the allograph broken bar ¦. This variant (briefly) replaced the continuous vertical bar in the 1967 version (only) of the ASCII standard. (Note: USAS X3.4-1967)

An initial draft for a 7-bit character set that was published by the X3.2 subcommittee for Coded Character Sets and Data Format on 8 June 1961, was the first to include the vertical bar in a standard set. The (unbroken) vertical bar was intended to be used as the representation for the logical OR symbol. A subsequent draft on 12 May 1966, places the vertical bar in column 7 alongside regional entry codepoints, and formed the basis for the original draft proposal used by the International Standards Organisation. This draft received opposition from the IBM user group SHARE, with its chairman, H. W. Nelson, writing a letter to the American Standards Association titled "The Proposed revised American Standard Code for Information Interchange does NOT meet the needs of computer programmers!"; in this letter, he argues that no characters within the international subset designated at columns 2-5 of the character set would be able to adequately represent logical OR and logical NOT in languages such as IBM's PL/I universally on all platforms. As a compromise, a requirement was introduced where the exclamation mark (!) and circumflex (^) would display as logical OR (|) and logical NOT (¬) respectively in use cases such as programming, while outside of these use cases they would represent their original typographic symbols:

"It may be desirable to employ distinctive styling to facilitate their use for specific purposes as, for example, to stylize the graphics in code positions 2/1 and 5/14 to those frequently associated with logical OR (|) and logical NOT (¬) respectively."

— X3.2 document X3.2/475

The original vertical bar encoded at 0x7C in the original 12 May 1966 draft was then broken as ¦, so it could not be confused with the unbroken logical OR. In the 1967 revision of ASCII, along with the equivalent ISO 464 code published the same year, the code point was defined to be a broken vertical bar, and the exclamation mark character was allowed to be rendered as a solid vertical bar. However, the 1977 revision (ANSI X.3-1977) undid the changes made in the 1967 revision, enforcing that the circumflex could no longer be stylised as a logical NOT symbol, the exclamation mark likewise no longer allowing stylisation as a vertical bar, and defining the code point originally set to the broken bar as a solid vertical bar instead; the same changes were also reverted in ISO 646-1973 published four years prior.

Some variants of EBCDIC included both versions of the character as different code points. The broad implementation of the extended ASCII ISO/IEC 8859 series in the 1990s also made a distinction between the two forms. This was preserved in Unicode as a separate character at U+00A6 ¦ BROKEN BAR (the term "parted rule" is used sometimes in Unicode documentation). Some fonts draw the characters the same (both are solid vertical bars, or both are broken vertical bars).

The broken bar does not appear to have any clearly identified uses distinct from those of the vertical bar. In non-computing use — for example in mathematics, physics and general typography — the broken bar is not an acceptable substitute for the vertical bar. In some dictionaries, the broken bar is used to mark stress that may be either primary or secondary: [¦ba] covers the pronunciations [ˈba] and [ˌba].

== Unicode ==
- U+007C | VERTICAL LINE (&verbar;, &vert;, &VerticalLine;) (single vertical line)
- U+00A6 ¦ BROKEN BAR (&brvbar;) (single broken line)
- U+2016 ‖ DOUBLE VERTICAL LINE (&Verbar;, &Vert;) (double vertical line ( $\|$ ): used in pairs to indicate norm)
- U+FF5C ｜ FULLWIDTH VERTICAL LINE (Fullwidth form)
- U+FFE4 ￤ FULLWIDTH BROKEN BAR
- U+2225 ∥ PARALLEL TO (&DoubleVerticalBar;, &par;, &parallel;, &shortparallel;, &spar;)
- U+01C0 ǀ LATIN LETTER DENTAL CLICK
- U+01C1 ǁ LATIN LETTER LATERAL CLICK
- U+2223 ∣ DIVIDES (&mid;, &shortmid;, &smid;, &VerticalBar;)
- U+2502 │ BOX DRAWINGS LIGHT VERTICAL (&boxv;) (and various other box drawing characters in the range U+2500 to U+257F)
- U+2758 ❘ LIGHT VERTICAL BAR
- U+0964 । DEVANAGARI DANDA
- U+0965 ॥ DEVANAGARI DOUBLE DANDA

=== Historical encodings ===
Code pages, ASCII, ISO/IEC, EBCDIC, Shift-JIS, etc.	Vertical bar (|)	Broken bar (¦)
ASCII, CP437, CP667, CP720, CP737, CP790, CP819, CP852, CP855, CP860, CP861, CP862, CP865, CP866, CP867, CP869, CP872, CP895, CP932, CP991	124 (7Ch)	none
CP775	124 (7Ch)	167 (A7h)
CP850, CP857, CP858	124 (7Ch)	221 (DDh)
CP863	124 (7Ch)	160 (A0h)
CP864	124 (7Ch)	219 (DBh)
ISO/IEC 8859-1, -7, -8, -9, -13, CP1250, CP1251, CP1252, CP1253, CP1254, CP1255, CP1256, CP1257, CP1258	124 (7Ch)	166 (A6h)
ISO/IEC 8859-2, -3, -4, -5, -6, -10, -11, -14, -15, -16	124 (7Ch)	none
EBCDIC CCSID 37	79 (4Fh)	106 (6Ah)
EBCDIC CCSID 500	187 (BBh)	106 (6Ah)
JIS X 0208, JIS X 0213	Men-ku-ten 1-01-35 (7-bit: 2143h; Shift JIS: 8162h; EUC: A1C3h) (Note: The Shift JIS and EUC encoded forms also include the ASCII vertical bar in its usual encoding (see halfwidth and fullwidth forms). The same applies when the 7-bit form is used as part of ISO-2022-JP (allowing switching to and from ASCII).)	none

== See also ==
- Bar (diacritic) – Diacritic used in some languages
- Triple bar – Symbol with multiple meanings
