= Arabic star =

Punctuation mark used for Arabic

٭o

Arabic star
- U+066D ٭ ARABIC FIVE POINTED STAR

The Arabic star is a punctuation mark added to Unicode 1.1 by political and cultural reasons to use it in typing instead of asterisk (U+002A * ASTERISK), which might take a six-lobed form (^{✻}) in some typesets reminding a six-pointed Star of David (✡) or might be even mistaken for it in a print of poor quality.

The Arabic star is given a distinct character in Unicode, U+066D ٭ ARABIC FIVE POINTED STAR (the note "appearance rather variable" was added in Unicode 5.1), in the range Arabic punctuation. Despite its name, the character might take an eight-lobed form in some typesets, which could be related to octagram shape of the Rub el Hizb sign (۞).

== Variants ==
In many modern fonts, however, the asterisk is five- or six-pointed, and the Arabic star is sometimes six- or eight-pointed. The two symbols are compared below (the display depends on your browser's default sans-serif font).

Asterisk	Full-width Asterisk	Arabic star	five-pointed star	six-pointed star	eight-pointed star
*	＊	٭	★	✶	✴

=== Unicode ===
In Unicode, Arabic and similar stars are encoded at:

- U+066D ٭ ARABIC FIVE POINTED STAR
- U+06DE ۞ ARABIC START OF RUB EL HIZB

In some displays, the use of the ٭ character can cause the text directionality to change.

== See also ==
- Star (grapheme)
