= Hamza =

Mark used in Arabic-based orthographies

Hamza همزة
- ء

Usage
- Writing system: Arabic script
- Type: Abjad
- Language of origin: Arabic language
- Sound values: /ʔ/
- In Unicode: U+0621 ARABIC LETTER HAMZA

Other
- Writing direction: Right-to-left

The hamza (Arabic: هَمْزَة hamza) (ء) is an Arabic script character that, in the Arabic alphabet, denotes a glottal stop and, in non-Arabic languages, indicates a diphthong, vowel, or other features, depending on the language. Derived from the letter ʿayn (ع), the hamza is written in initial, medial, and final positions as an unlinked letter or placed above or under a carrier character. Despite its common usage as a letter in Modern Standard Arabic, it is generally not considered to be one of its letters, although some argue that it should be considered so.

The hamza is often romanized as a typewriter apostrophe ('), a modifier letter apostrophe (ʼ), a modifier letter right half ring (ʾ), or as the International Phonetic Alphabet symbol ⟨ʔ⟩. In Arabizi, it is either written as "2" or not written at all.

In the Phoenician, Hebrew and Aramaic alphabets, from which the Arabic alphabet is descended, the glottal stop was expressed by aleph (𐤀), continued by alif (ا) in the Arabic alphabet. However, alif was used to express both a glottal stop /ʔ/ and a long vowel /aː/. In order to indicate that a glottal stop is used and not a vowel, the hamza was added to alif diacritically. Just as Greek vowels were used as diacritical marks to indicate vowel sounds in Western Syriac, the hamza (in effect a lower-case Greek alpha) was used as a diacritical mark in Arabic to indicate the original Alif glottal stop. In modern Arabic orthography, hamza may also appear on the line under certain circumstances as though it were a full letter, independent of an alif.

== Etymology ==
Hamza is derived from the verb hamaza (هَمَزَ) meaning 'to prick, goad, drive' or 'to provide (a letter or word) with hamzah'.

== Hamzat al-waṣl ⟨ٱ⟩ ==
The hamza ⟨ء⟩ on its own is hamzat al-qaṭʿ (هَمْزَة الْقَطْع, "the hamzah which breaks, ceases or halts", i.e. the broken, cessation, halting"), otherwise referred to as qaṭʿat (قَطْعَة), that is, a phonemic glottal stop unlike the hamzat al-waṣl (هَمْزَة الوَصْل, "the hamzah which attaches, connects or joins", i.e. the attachment, connection, joining"), a non-phonemic glottal stop produced automatically only if at the beginning of an utterance, otherwise assimilated. Although the hamzat al-waṣl can be written as an alif carrying a waṣlah sign ⟨ٱ⟩ (only in the Quran), it is normally indicated by a plain alif without a hamza ⟨ا⟩.

⟨ٱ⟩ occurs in:

- the definite article al-
- some short words with two of their three-consonant roots apparent: ism اِسْم 'name', ibn اِبْن 'son', imruʾ اِمْرُؤ 'man', iṯnān اِثْنَان 'two'
- the imperative verbs of forms I and VII to X
- the perfective aspect of verb forms VII to X and their verbal nouns
- some borrowed words that start with consonant clusters such as ʾistūdiyū إِسْتُودِيُو

It is not pronounced following a vowel (الْبَيْتُ الكَبِير, al-baytu l-kabīru). This event occurs in the definite article, or at the beginning of a noun following a preposition, or a verb following a relative pronoun. If the definite article al- is followed by a sun letter, -l- also gives way for the next letter for lām ⟨ل⟩ is assimilated.

== Orthography ==
The hamza can be written either alone, as if it were a letter, or with a carrier, when it becomes a diacritic:

- Low hamza (only one form):

Position in word:	Isolated	Final	Medial	Initial
Glyph form: (Help)	ء	ء	ء	(none)

- By itself:
- High Hamza (used in Kazakh; only one form, though used in medial and final positions where it is non-joining), after any Arabic letter (if that letter has an initial or medial form, these forms will be changed to isolated or final forms respectively):

Position in word:	Isolated	Final	Medial	Initial
Glyph form: (Help)	ٴ	ٴ	ٴ	(none)

- Three-Quarter High Hamza (used in Malay; only one form, though used in medial and final positions where it is non-joining):

Position in word:	Isolated	Final	Medial	Initial
Glyph form: (Help)	ء	ء	ء	(none)

This form has been proposed for the inclusion to the Unicode Standard, but the Unicode Script Ad Hoc Group stated that it can be unified with the existing U+0674 ٴ ARABIC LETTER HIGH HAMZA. The form above currently being displayed using a standard Arabic Hamza with an altered vertical position.
- Combined with a letter:
- Above or below an Alif:

Position in word:	Isolated	Final	Medial	Initial
Glyph form: (Help)	أ	ـأ	ـأ	أ

Position in word:	Isolated	Final	Medial	Initial
Glyph form: (Help)	إ	ـإ	ـإ	إ

- Above a Wāw:

Position in word:	Isolated	Final	Medial	Initial
Glyph form: (Help)	ؤ	ـؤ	ـؤ	ؤ

- Above a dotless Yāʾ, also called Hamza ʿAlā Nabrah (Arabic: همزة على نبرة, lit. 'Hamza on a seat'). Joined medially and finally in Arabic, other languages written in Arabic-based script may have it initially as well (or it may take its isolated or initial shape, even in Arabic, after a non-joining letter in the same word):

Position in word:	Isolated	Final	Medial	Initial
Glyph form: (Help)	ئ	ـئ	ـئـ	ئـ

- Above Hāʾ. In the Persian and Pashto alphabets, not used in Arabic:

Position in word:	Isolated	Final	Medial	Initial
Glyph form: (Help)	هٔ	ـهٔ	ـهٔـ	هٔـ

- Above Ḥāʾ. In the Pashto alphabet, not used in Arabic:

Position in word:	Isolated	Final	Medial	Initial
Glyph form: (Help)	ځ	ـځ	ـځـ	ځـ

- Above Rāʾ. In the Khowar alphabet, not used in Arabic:

Position in word:	Isolated	Final	Medial	Initial
Glyph form: (Help)	ݬ	ـݬ	ـݬ	ݬ

- Above a Baṛī yē. In the Urdu alphabet, not used in Arabic:

Position in word:	Isolated	Final	Medial	Initial
Glyph form: (Help)	ۓ	ـۓ	ـۓ	ۓ

- Above a Choṭī hē. In the Urdu alphabet, not used in Arabic

Position in word:	Isolated	Final	Medial	Initial
Glyph form: (Help)	ۂ	ـۂ	ـۂـ	ۂـ

== Arabic "seat" rules ==
The rules for writing hamza differ somewhat between languages even if the writing is based on the Arabic abjad. The following addresses Arabic specifically.

=== Summary ===
- Initial hamza is always placed over (أ for ʾa- or ʾu-) or under (إ for ʾi-) an alif.
- Medial hamza will have a seat or be written alone:
  - Surrounding vowels determine the seat of the hamza with preceding long vowels and diphthongs (such as aw or ay) being ignored.
  - i- (ئ) over u- (ؤ) over a- (أ) if there are two conflicting vowels that count; on the line (ء) if there are none.
  - As a special case, āʾa, ūʾa and awʾa require hamza on the line, instead of over an alif as one would expect. (See III.1b below.)
- Final hamza will have a seat or be written alone:
  - Alone on the line when preceded by a long vowel or final consonant.
  - Has a seat matching the final short vowel for words ending in a short vowel.
- Two adjacent alifs are never allowed. If the rules call for this, replace the combination by a single alif maddah.

=== Detailed description ===
- Logically, hamza is just like any other letter, but it may be written in different ways. It has no effect on the way other letters are written. In particular, surrounding long vowels are written just as they always are, regardless of the "seat" of the hamza—even if this results in the appearance of two consecutive wāws or yāʾs.
- The hamza can be written in five ways: on its own ("on the line"), under an alif, or over an alif, wāw, or yāʾ, called the "seat" of the hamza. When written over yāʾ, the dots that would normally be written underneath are omitted.
- When according to the rules below, a hamza with an alif seat would occur before an alif which represents the vowel ā, a single alif is instead written with the maddah symbol over it.
- The rules for hamza depend on whether it occurs as the initial, middle, or final letter (not sound) in a word. (Thus, final short inflectional vowels do not count, but -an is written as alif + nunation, counts, and the hamza is considered medial.)

I. If the hamza is initial:

- If the following letter is a short vowel, fatḥah (a) (as in أَفْرَاد ʾafrād) or ḍammah (u) (as in أُصُول ʾuṣūl), the hamza is written over a place-holding alif; kasrah (i) (as in إِسْلَام ʾislām) the hamza is written under a place-holding alif and is called "hamza on a wall."
- If the letter following the hamza is an alif itself: (as in آكُل ʾākul) alif maddah will occur.

II. If the hamza is final:

- If a short vowel precedes, the hamza is written over the letter (alif, wāw, or yāʾ) corresponding to the short vowel.
- Otherwise, the hamza is written on the line (as in شَيْء shayʾ "thing").

III. If the hamza is medial:

- If a long vowel or diphthong precedes, the seat of the hamza is determined mostly by what follows:

- If i or u follows, the hamza is written over yāʾ or wāw, accordingly.
- Otherwise, the hamza would be written on the line. If a yāʾ precedes, however, that would conflict with the stroke joining the yāʾ to the following letter, so the hamza is written over yāʾ. (as in بطِيئَة)

- Otherwise, both preceding and following vowels have an effect on the hamza.

- If there is only one vowel (or two of the same kind), that vowel determines the seat (alif, wāw, or yāʾ).
- If there are two conflicting vowels, i takes precedence over u, u over a so miʾah 'hundred' is written مِئَة, with hamza over the yāʾ.
- Alif-maddah occurs if appropriate.

Not surprisingly, the complexity of the rules causes some disagreement.

- Barron's 201 Arabic Verbs follows the rules exactly (but the sequence ūʾū does not occur; see below).
- John Mace's Teach Yourself Arabic Verbs and Essential Grammar presents alternative forms in almost all cases when hamza is followed by a long ū. The motivation appears to be to avoid two wāws in a row. Generally, the choice is between the form following the rules here or an alternative form using hamza over yāʾ in all cases. Example forms are masʾūl (مَسْئُول, [adj: responsible, in charge, accountable]; [noun: official, functionary]), yajīʾūna (يَجِيئُونَ, verb: jāʾa جَاءَ "to come"), yashāʾūna (يَشَائُونَ، يَشَاءُونَ, verb: shāʾa شَاءَ "to will, to want, to intend, to wish"). Exceptions:

- In the sequence ūʾū (yasūʾūna, verb: sā'a سَاءَ "to act badly, be bad") the alternatives are hamza on the line يَسُوءُونَ, or hamza over yāʾ يَسُوئُونَ, when the rules here would call for hamza over wāw. Perhaps, the resulting sequence of three wāws would be especially repugnant.
- In the sequence yaqraʾūna (يَقْرَأُونَ, verb: qaraʾa قَرَأَ "to read, to recite, to review/ study") the alternative form has hamza over alif, not yāʾ.
- The forms yabṭuʾūna (يَبْطُؤُونَ, verb: baṭuʾa بَطُؤَ "to be or become slow, late or backward, "to come late", "to move slowly") and yaʾūbu (يَؤُوبُ, verb: آبَ "move to the back", "to return to come back", "to repent") have no alternative form. (Note yaqraʾūna with the same sequence of vowels.)

- Haywood and Nahmad's A new Arabic Grammar of the Written Language does not write the paradigms out in full, but in general agrees with John Mace's book, including the alternative forms and sometimes lists a third alternative with the entire sequence ʾū written as a single hamza over wāw instead of as two letters.
- Al-Kitāb fī Taʿallum... presents paradigms with hamza written the same way throughout, regardless of the rules above. Thus yabdaʾūna with hamza only over alif, yajīʾūna with hamza only over yāʾ, yaqraʾīna with hamza only over alif, but that is not allowed in any of the previous three books. (It appears to be an overgeneralization on the part of the al-Kitāb writers.)

== Overview tables ==
The letter ط (ṭ) stands here for any consonant.

Note: The table shows only potential combinations and their graphic representations according to the spelling rules; not every possible combination exists in Arabic.

Intervocalic
first	second					
first	ʾiṭ	ʾuṭ	ʾaṭ	ʾīṭ	ʾūṭ	ʾāṭ
ṭiʾ	ṭiʾiṭ	ṭiʾuṭ	ṭiʾaṭ	ṭiʾīṭ	ṭiʾūṭ	ṭiʾāṭ
ṭiʾ	طِئِط	طِئُط	طِئَط	طِئِيط	طِئُوط	طِئَاط
ṭuʾ	ṭuʾiṭ	ṭuʾuṭ	ṭuʾaṭ	ṭuʾīṭ	ṭuʾūṭ (Note: Arabic writing has tried to avoid two consecutive wāws, however, in Modern Arabic this rule is less applicable, thus modern رُؤُوس ruʾūs "heads" corresponds to رُءُوس in the Quran.)	ṭuʾāṭ
ṭuʾ	طُئِط	طُؤُط	طُؤَط	طُئِيط	طُؤُوط	طُؤَاط
ṭaʾ	ṭaʾiṭ	ṭaʾuṭ	ṭaʾaṭ	ṭaʾīṭ	ṭaʾūṭ	ṭaʾāṭ
ṭaʾ	طَئِط	طَؤُط	طَأَط	طَئِيط	طَؤُوط	طَآط
ṭīʾ	ṭīʾiṭ	ṭīʾuṭ	ṭīʾaṭ	ṭīʾīṭ	ṭīʾūṭ	ṭīʾāṭ
ṭīʾ	طِيئِط	طِيئُط	طِيئَط	طِيئِيط	طِيئُوط	طِيئَاط
ṭayʾ	ṭayʾiṭ	ṭayʾuṭ	ṭayʾaṭ	ṭayʾīṭ	ṭayʾūṭ	ṭayʾāṭ
ṭayʾ	طَيْئِط	طَيْئُط	طَيْئَط	طَيْئِيط	طَيْئُوط	طَيْئَاط
ṭūʾ	ṭūʾiṭ	ṭūʾuṭ	ṭūʾaṭ	ṭūʾīṭ	ṭūʾūṭ	ṭūʾāṭ
ṭūʾ	طُوءِط	طُوءُط	طُوءَط	طُوءِيط	طُوءُوط	طُوءَاط
ṭawʾ	ṭawʾiṭ	ṭawʾuṭ	ṭawʾaṭ	ṭawʾīṭ	ṭawʾūṭ	ṭawʾāṭ
ṭawʾ	طَوْءِط	طَوْءُط	طَوْءَط	طَوْءِيط	طَوْءُوط	طَوْءَاط
ṭawʾ	طَوْئِط	طَوْؤُط	طَوْأَط	طَوْئِيط	طَوْءُوط	طَوْآط
ṭāʾ	ṭāʾiṭ	ṭāʾuṭ	ṭāʾaṭ	ṭāʾīṭ	ṭāʾūṭ	ṭāʾāṭ
ṭāʾ	طَائِط	طَاؤُط	طَاءَط	طَائِيط	طَاءُوط	طَاءَاط

Other cases
condition	vowel					
condition	i	u	a	ī	ū	ā
#_VC	ʾiṭ	ʾuṭ	ʾaṭ	ʾīṭ	ʾūṭ	ʾāṭ
#_VC	إِط	أُط	أَط	إِيط	أُوط	آط
C_VC	ṭʾiṭ	ṭʾuṭ	ṭʾaṭ	ṭʾīṭ	ṭʾūṭ	ṭʾāṭ
C_VC	طْئِط	طْؤُط	طْأَط	طْئِيط	طْؤُوط	طْآط
CV_C	ṭiʾṭ	ṭuʾṭ	ṭaʾṭ	ṭīʾṭ	ṭūʾṭ	ṭāʾṭ
CV_C	طِئْط	طُؤْط	طَأْط	طِيئْط	طُوءْط	طَاءْط
CV_#	ṭiʾ	ṭuʾ	ṭaʾ	ṭīʾ	ṭūʾ	ṭāʾ
CV_#	طِئ	طُؤ	طَأ	طِيء	طُوء	طَاء
CV_#	طِء	طُء	طَء	طِيء	طُوء	طَاء

Colours:

The hamza is written over yāʾ ئ
The hamza is written over wāw ؤ
The hamza is written over or under alif أ , آ , إ
The hamza is written on the line ء

== Hamza in other Arabic-script alphabets ==
=== Jawi alphabet ===
In the Jawi alphabet (Arabic script used to write Malay), hamza is used for various purposes, but is rarely used to denote a glottal stop except in certain Arabic loanwords. The default isolated hamza form (Malay: hamzah setara) is the second least common form of hamza, whereas another form unique to the Jawi script, the three-quarter high hamza (Malay: hamzah tiga suku) is most commonly used in daily Jawi writing. The three-quarter high hamza itself is used in many cases:

- Separating vowel letters of a diphthongs such as ai, au, and oi when present in certain positions within words
- Preceding certain suffixes such as ⟨ن⟩ (-an) and ⟨ي⟩ (-i)
- To write non-Malay single-syllable words (most commonly names) that starts with a vowel other than alif ⟨ا⟩
- Glottal stops for archaic words (specifically titles and names which have a fixed spelling)
- In some instances Arabic loanwords which change their original spelling may change the hamza to the three-quarter high hamza instead

This exact form is not available in Unicode Standard, as it is unified with U+0674 ٴ ARABIC LETTER HIGH HAMZA, but the common way of writing this form is by using a normal hamza and altering its vertical position.

Hamza above alif ⟨أ⟩ is used for prefixed words using the prefixes ⟨ک⟩, ⟨د⟩, or ⟨س⟩, where its root word starts with a vowel (such as د+امبيل (di+ambil), becomes دأمبيل (diambil)). This form as well as hamza below alif ⟨إ⟩ are both also in Arabic loanwords where the original spelling has been retained.

The hamza above ya ⟨ئ⟩ is known as a "housed hamzah" (Malay: hamzah berumah), and is most commonly used in Arabic loanwords. It is also used for words which repeat or combine "i" and "é" vowels like چميئيه (cemeeh meaning "taunt") and for denoting a glottal stop in the middle of a word after a consonant such as سوبئيديتور (subeditor). More commonly, however, it is used for denoting a schwa after the vowels "i", "é", "o", and "u" such as چندليئر (chandelier).

Hamza above waw ⟨ؤ⟩ is completely removed from the Jawi alphabet, and for Arabic loanwords using the letter, it is replaced with a normal waw followed by a three-quarter high hamza instead.

=== Urdu (Shahmukhi) alphabet ===
In the Urdu alphabet, hamza does not occur at the initial position over alif since alif is not used as a glottal stop in Urdu. In the middle position, if hamza is surrounded by vowels, it indicates a diphthong or syllable break between the two vowels. In the middle position, if hamza is surrounded by only one vowel, it takes the sound of that vowel. In the final position hamza is silent or produces a glottal sound, as in Arabic.

In Urdu, hamza usually represents a diphthong between two vowels. It rarely acts like the Arabic hamza except in a few loanwords from Arabic.

Hamza is also added at the last letter of the first word of ezāfe compound to represent -e- if the first word ends with yeh or with he or over bari yeh if it is added at the end of the first word of the ezāfe compound.

Hamza is always written on the line in the middle position unless in waw if that letter is preceded by a non-joiner letter; then, it is seated above waw. Hamza is also seated when written above baṛi yeh. In the final form, Hamza is written in its full form. In ezāfe, hamza is seated above choṭi he, yeh or baṛi yeh of the first word to represent the -e- of ezāfe compound.

=== Uyghur alphabet ===
In the Uyghur Arabic alphabet, the hamza is not a distinct letter, but indicates a glottal stop preceding a vowel. Combinations of hamza and the vowel, such as ئا (a), are considered independent letters, while the vowel letters in isolation (without hamza, such as ا) are considered their joining forms. Hence, the vowel letters that do not join with the following letter have four joining forms (isolated and final, both with and without hamza), while the letters ئې (ë) and ئى (i) have eight forms.

=== Kazakh alphabet ===
In the Kazakh Arabic alphabet, the hamza is used only at the beginning of words, and the only form is high hamza. It is not used to denote any sound, but to indicate that the vowels in the word will be the four front vowels: ⟨ٵ⟩ (ä), ⟨ٸ⟩ (ı), ⟨ٶ⟩ (ö), ⟨ٷ⟩ (ü). However, it is not used for words containing another front vowel ⟨ە⟩ (e) or words containing four consonants ⟨گ⟩ (g), ⟨ع⟩ (ğ), ⟨ك⟩ (k), ⟨ق⟩ (q).

=== Persian alphabet ===
In the Persian alphabet, the hamza often denotes glottal stop (a similar function to the letter 'ayn ⟨ع⟩), and is commonly found in Arabic loanwords only. Hamza below alif ⟨إ⟩ is completely removed from the Persian alphabet, and in Arabic loanwords, alif maddah ⟨آ⟩ is used instead.

The hamza may be used over the letters heh or yeh for the ezāfe suffix, though a non-connecting yeh may be used instead.

== Wavy hamza in Kashmiri ==
ٲ
اٟ

The Kashmiri language written in Arabic script includes the diacritic or "wavy hamza". In Kashmiri the diacritic is called amālü mad when used above alif: ٲ to create the vowel /əː/. Kashmiri calls the "wavy hamza" as sāyi mad when below the alif: اٟ to create the sound /ɨː/.

== Latin representations ==
There are different ways to represent hamza in Latin transliteration:

- In the International Phonetic Alphabet (IPA), the sound of the glottal stop is represented by the letter ʔ, resembling a dotless question mark.
- There is a tradition of using ', the simple apostrophe; and a grave accent ` represents `ayn (ع).
- Some standard transliterations such as DIN 31635 transliterate it with a modifier letter right half ring ʾ. Others such as ALA-LC use the modifier letter apostrophe ʼ or sometimes substitute the similar-looking Right Single Quotation Mark ’.
- Different unstandardized symbols exist such as 2 in Arabic chat alphabet.

== See also ==
- ʼ and ʾ
- ʻOkina
- Glottal stop
- Saltillo
- Aleph
- Arabic alphabet
- Arabic phonology
- Dagger alif
- Glottal stop (letter)
- Hamza (name)
- Harakat
- Help:IPA/Arabic
- Romanization of Arabic
- Varieties of Arabic
