= Yodh =

Tenth letter of many Semitic alphabets

← Teth Yodh Kaph →
- Phoenician: 𐤉
- Hebrew: י
- Samaritan: ࠉ
- Aramaic: 𐡉
- Syriac: ܝ
- Nabataean: 𐢍𐢌
- Arabic: ي
- South Arabian: 𐩺
- Geʽez: የ
- North Arabian: 𐪚
- Ugaritic: 𐎊
- Phonemic representation: j, i, e
- Position in alphabet: 10
- Numerical value: 10

Alphabetic derivatives of the Phoenician
- Greek: Ι
- Latin: I, J, İ, J̇
- Cyrillic: І, Ј

Yodh (also spelled jodh, yod, or jod) is the tenth letter of the Semitic abjads, including Phoenician yōd 𐤉, Hebrew yod י, Aramaic yod 𐡉, Syriac yōḏ ܝ, and Arabic yāʾ ي. It is also related to the Ancient North Arabian 𐪚, South Arabian 𐩺, and Ge'ez የ. Its sound value is /j/ in all languages for which it is used; in many languages, it also serves as a long vowel, representing /iː/.

The Phoenician letter gave rise to the Greek Iota (Ι), Latin I and J, Cyrillic І, Coptic Iauda (Ⲓ) and Gothic eis.

The term yod is often used to refer to the speech sound [j], a palatal approximant, even in discussions of languages not written in Semitic abjads, as in phonological phenomena such as English "yod-dropping".

== Origins ==
Yod is derived from an Egyptian hieroglyph representing a hand, as in the Biblical Hebrew word yad (יָד) 'hand'.

Before the late nineteenth century, the letter yāʼ was written without its two dots, especially those in the Levant.

== Arabic yāʼ ==
Yāʾ ياء
- ي

Usage
- Writing system: Arabic script
- Type: Abjad
- Language of origin: Arabic language
- Sound values: [j], [iː]
- Alphabetical position: 4

History
Development
D36
  - 𐤉
    - 𐡉
      - ى
        - ي

Other
- Writing direction: Right-to-left

The letter ي is named yāʼ (يَاء). It is written in several ways depending on its position in the word:

Position in word:	Isolated	Final	Medial	Initial
Glyph form: (Help)	ي	ـي	ـيـ	يـ

It is pronounced in four ways:

- As a consonant, it is pronounced as a palatal approximant /j/, typically at the beginnings of words in front of short or long vowels.
- A long /iː/ usually in the middle or end of words. In this case it has no diacritic, but could be marked with a kasra in the preceding letter in some traditions.
- A long /eː/ In many dialects, as a result of the monophthongization that the diphthong /aj/ underwent in most words.
- A part of a diphthong, /aj/. Then, it has no diacritic but could be marked with a sukun in some traditions. The preceding consonant could have no diacritic or have fatḥa sign, hinting to the first vowel in the diphthong, i.e. /a/.

As a vowel, yāʾ can serve as the "seat" of the hamza: ئ

Yāʾ serves several functions in the Arabic language. Yāʾ as a prefix is the marker for a singular imperfective verb, as in يَكْتُب yaktub "he writes" from the root ك-ت-ب K-T-B ("write, writing"). Yāʾ with a shadda is particularly used to turn a noun into an adjective, called a nisbah (نِسْبَة). For instance, مِصْر Miṣr (Egypt) → مِصْرِيّ Miṣriyy (Egyptian). The transformation can be more abstract; for instance, مَوْضُوع mawḍūʿ (matter, object) → مَوْضُوعِيّ mawḍūʿiyy (objective). Still other uses of this function can be a bit further from the root: اِشْتِرَاك ishtirāk (cooperation) → اِشْتِرَاكِيّ ishtirākiyy (socialist). The common pronunciation of the final /-ijj/ is most often pronounced as [i] or [iː].

A form similar to but distinguished from yāʾ is the ʾalif maqṣūrah (أَلِف مَقْصُورَة) "limited/restricted alif", with the form ى. It indicates a final long /aː/.

=== Alif maqṣūrah ===
In Arabic, alif maqṣūrah is the letter yāʼ without its two dots, and it is thus written as:

Position in word:	Isolated	Final	Medial	Initial
Glyph form: (Help)	ى	ـى	ـىـ	ىـ

However, this letter cannot be used initially or medially in Arabic. The alif maqṣūrah with hamza is thus written as:

Position in word:	Isolated	Final	Medial	Initial
Glyph form: (Help)	ئ	ـئ	ـئـ	ئـ

=== Perso-Arabic ye ===
In the Persian alphabet, the letter is generally called ye following Persian-language custom. Traditionally, in its isolated and final forms, the letter does not have dots (ی), much like the Arabic Alif maqṣūrah or, in the Quran, much like the custom in Egypt, Sudan, and sometimes Maghreb. On account of this difference, Perso-Arabic ye is located at a different Unicode code point than both of the standard Arabic letters. In computers, the Persian version of the letter automatically appears with two dots initially and medially: (یـ ـیـ ـی).

Position in word:	Isolated	Final	Medial	Initial
Naskh glyph form: (Help)	ی	ـی	ـیـ	یـ
Nastaliq glyph form:	ی	ــــی	ــــیــــ	یــــ

In Kashmiri, it uses a ring instead of dots below (ؠ) (ؠ ؠـ ـؠـ ـؠ).

Position in word:	Isolated	Final	Medial	Initial
Glyph form: (Help)	ؠ	ـؠ	ـؠـ	ؠـ

=== Returned yāʾ ===
In different calligraphic styles like the Hijazi script, Kufic, and Nastaʿlīq script, a final yāʾ might have a particular shape with the descender turned to the right (ـے), called al-yāʾ al-mardūdah/al-rājiʿah ("returned, recurred yāʾ"), either with two dots or without them.

In Urdu this is called baṛī ye ("big ye"), but is an independent letter used for /ɛː, eː/ and differs from the basic ye (choṭī ye, "little ye"). For this reason the letter has its own code point in Unicode. Nevertheless, its initial and medial forms are not different from the other ye (practically baṛī ye is not used in these positions).

Position in word:	Isolated	Final	Medial	Initial
Naskh glyph form: (Help)	ے	ـے	ـے	ے
Nastaliq glyph form:	ے	ــــے	ــــے	ے

== Hebrew yod ==
Orthographic variants
Various print fonts			Cursive Hebrew	Solitreo	Rashi script
Serif	Sans-serif	Monospaced	Cursive Hebrew	Solitreo	Rashi script
י	י	י			

Hebrew spelling: יוֹד ; colloquial יוּד

The letter appears with or without a hook on different sans-serif fonts, for example

- Arial, Arimo, DejaVu Sans, Liberation Sans: י
- Tahoma, Noto Sans Hebrew, Alef, Heebo: י

=== Pronunciation ===
In both Biblical and Modern Hebrew, Yod represents a palatal approximant [j]. As a mater lectionis, it represents the vowel [i].

=== Significance ===
In gematria, Yod represents the number ten.

As a prefix, it designates the third person singular (or plural, with a Vav as a suffix) in the future tense.

As a suffix, it indicates first person singular possessive; av (father) becomes avi (my father).

==== In religion ====
Two Yods in a row (יי) designate the name of God and in pointed texts are written with the vowels of Adonai, which is done as well with the Tetragrammaton.

As Yod is the smallest letter, much kabbalistic and mystical significance is attached. According to the Gospel of Matthew, Jesus mentioned it during the Antithesis of the Law, when he says: "One jot or one tittle shall in no wise pass from the law, till all be fulfilled." Jot, or iota, refers to the letter Yod; scribes often overlooked it because of its size and position as a mater lectionis. In Modern Hebrew, "tip of the yod" refers to a small and insignificant thing, and someone who "worries about the tip of a yod" is picky and meticulous about minor details.

Much kabbalistic and mystical significance is also attached to it because of its gematria value as ten, which is an important number in Judaism, and its place in the name of God.

=== Yiddish ===
In Yiddish, the letter yod is used for several orthographic purposes in native words:

- Alone, a single yod י may represent the vowel [i] or the consonant [j]. When adjacent to another vowel, or another yod, [i] may be distinguished from [j] by the addition of a dot below. Thus the word Yidish 'Yiddish' is spelled ייִדיש. The first yod represents [j]; the second yod represents [i] and is distinguished from the adjacent [j] by a dot; the third yod represents [i] as well, but no dot is necessary.
- The digraph יי, consisting of two yods, represents the diphthong [ej].
- A pair of yods with a horizontal line (pasekh) under them, ײַ, represents the diphthong [aj] in standard Yiddish.
- The digraph consisting of a vov followed by a yod, וי, represents the diphthong [oj].

In traditional and YIVO Yiddish orthography, loanwords from Hebrew or Aramaic ("loshn koydesh") are spelled as they are in their language of origin. In the Soviet orthography, they are written phonetically like other Yiddish words.

== Syriac yod ==
The Syriac script variant is ⟨ܝ⟩.

== Character encodings ==
Character information
Preview	י		ي		ی		ܝ		ࠉ	
Unicode name	HEBREW LETTER YOD		ARABIC LETTER YEH		ARABIC LETTER FARSI YEH		SYRIAC LETTER YUDH		SAMARITAN LETTER YUT	
Encodings	decimal	hex	dec	hex	dec	hex	dec	hex	dec	hex
Unicode	1497	U+05D9	1610	U+064A	1740	U+06CC	1821	U+071D	2057	U+0809
UTF-8	215 153	D7 99	217 138	D9 8A	219 140	DB 8C	220 157	DC 9D	224 160 137	E0 A0 89
Numeric character reference	&#1497;	&#x5D9;	&#1610;	&#x64A;	&#1740;	&#x6CC;	&#1821;	&#x71D;	&#2057;	&#x809;

Character information
Preview	𐎊		𐡉		𐤉	
Unicode name	UGARITIC LETTER YOD		IMPERIAL ARAMAIC LETTER YODH		PHOENICIAN LETTER YOD	
Encodings	decimal	hex	dec	hex	dec	hex
Unicode	66442	U+1038A	67657	U+10849	67849	U+10909
UTF-8	240 144 142 138	F0 90 8E 8A	240 144 161 137	F0 90 A1 89	240 144 164 137	F0 90 A4 89
UTF-16	55296 57226	D800 DF8A	55298 56393	D802 DC49	55298 56585	D802 DD09
Numeric character reference	&#66442;	&#x1038A;	&#67657;	&#x10849;	&#67849;	&#x10909;
