= Shaddah =

Arabic diacritic marking gemination

Shaddah (Arabic: شَدّة shaddah [ˈʃæd.dæ], '[sign of] emphasis', also called by the verbal noun from the same root, tashdid تشديد tashdīd 'emphasis') is one of the diacritics used with the Arabic alphabet, indicating a geminated (long) consonant. It is functionally equivalent to writing a consonant twice in the orthographies of languages such as for example Latin, Italian, Swedish, and Ancient Greek, and is rendered as such in Latin script in most schemes of Arabic transliteration, e.g. رُمّان = rummān 'pomegranate'.

== Form ==
In shape, it is a small letter س sin, standing for shaddah. It was devised for poetry by al-Khalil ibn Ahmad in the eighth century, replacing an earlier dot.

General Unicode	Name	Transliteration
0651 ّ^{ّ}	shaddah	(consonant doubled)

== Combination with other diacritics ==
When a shaddah is used on a consonant which also takes a fatḥah /a/, the fatḥah is written above the shaddah. If the consonant takes a kasrah /i/, it is written between the consonant and the shaddah instead of its usual place below the consonant, however this last case is an exclusively Arabic language practice, not in other languages that use the Arabic script.

For example, see the location of the diacritics on the letter ـهـ h in the following words:

Arabic	Transliteration	Meaning	Diacritic	Location of the diacritic
يَفْهَمُ	yafhamu	[he] understands	fatḥah	Above the letter
فَهَّمَ	fahhama	[he] explained	fatḥah	Above the shaddah
فَهِمَ	fahima	[he] understood	kasrah	Below the letter
فَهِّمْ	fahhim	explain!	kasrah	Between the shaddah and the letter

When writing Arabic by hand, it is customary first to write the shaddah and then the vowel diacritic.

In Unicode representation, the shaddah can appear either before or after the vowel diacritic, and most modern fonts can handle both options. However, in the canonical Unicode ordering the shaddah appears following the vowel diacritic, even though phonetically it should follow directly the consonantal letter.

== Significance of marking consonant length ==
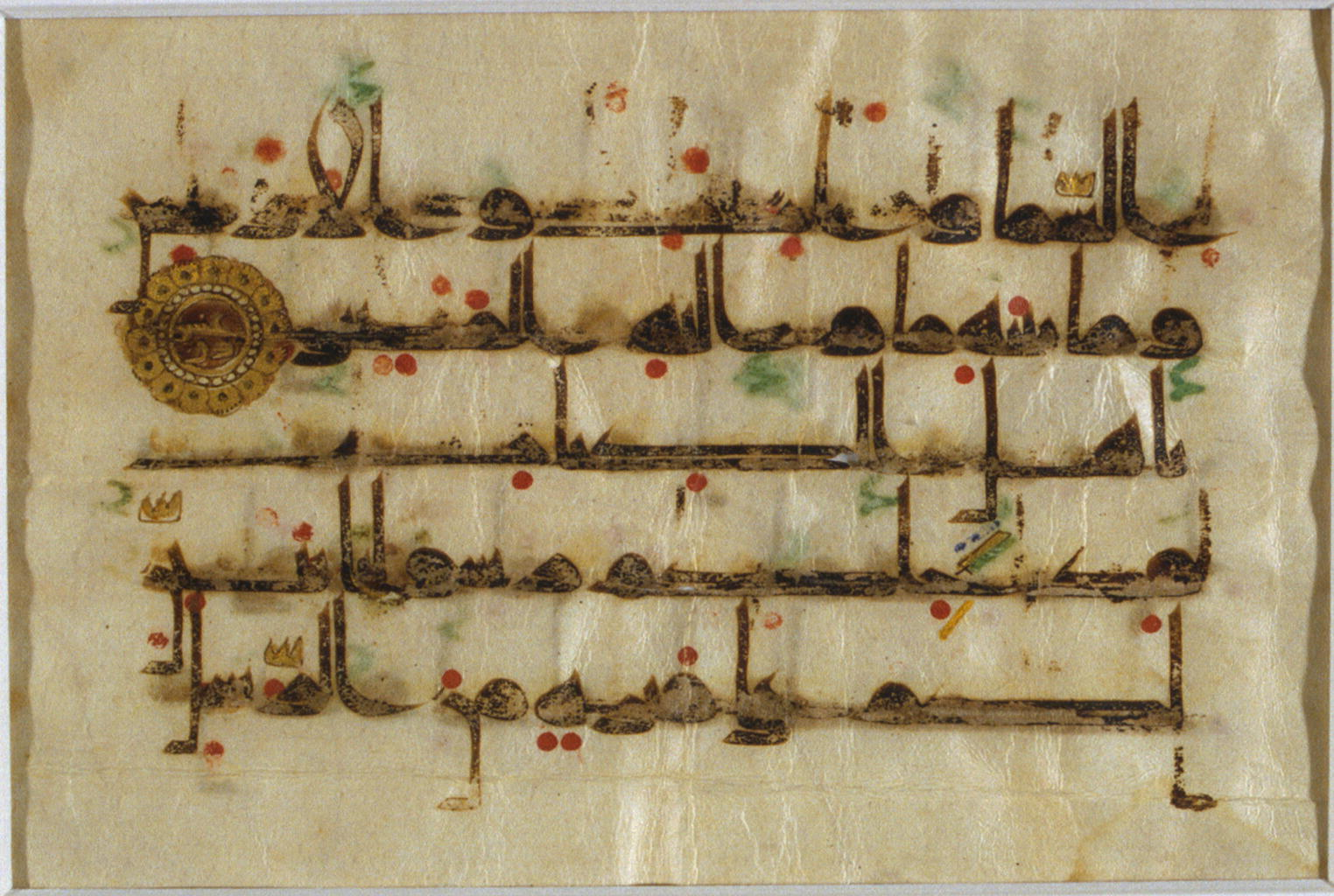
10th-century Qu'ran with the shaddat in gold

Consonant length in Arabic is contrastive: دَرَسَ darasa means "he studied", while دَرَّسَ darrasa means "he taught"; بَكى صَبي bakā ṣabiyy means "a youth cried" while بَكّى الصَّبي bakkā ṣ-ṣabiyy means "the youth was made to cry".

A consonant may be long because of the form of the noun or verb; e.g., the causative form of the verb requires the second consonant of the root to be long, as in darrasa above, or by assimilation of consonants, for example the l- of the Arabic definite article al- assimilates to all dental consonants, e.g. (الصّبي) (a)ṣ-ṣabiyy instead of (a)l-ṣabiyy, or through metathesis, the switching of sounds, for example أَقَلّ aqall 'less, fewer' (instead of *أَقْلَل aqlal), as compared to أَكْبَر akbar 'greater'.

A syllable closed by a long consonant is made a long syllable. This affects both stress and prosody. Stress falls on the first long syllable from the end of the word, hence أَقَلّ aqáll (or, with iʻrāb, aqállu) as opposed to أَكْبَر ákbar, مَحَبّة maḥábbah "love, agape" as opposed to مَعْرِفة maʻrifah '(experiential) knowledge'. In Arabic verse, when scanning the meter, a syllable closed by a long consonant is counted as long, just like any other syllable closed by a consonant or a syllable ending in a long vowel: أَلا تَمْدَحَنَّ a-lā tamdaḥanna 'Will you not indeed praise...?' is scanned as a-lā tam-da-ḥan-na: short, long, long, short, long, short.

== See also ==
- Arabic diacritics
- Arabic alphabet
- Dagesh ḥazak, a functionally similar diacritic used to indicate gemination in Biblical Hebrew
