= Sin (letter) =

Arabic letter

← Nun Sin Ayin →
- Arabic: س
- Phonemic representation: s
- Position in alphabet: 15
- Numerical value: 60

Alphabetic derivatives of the Phoenician

Sīn سين
- س

Usage
- Writing system: Arabic script
- Type: Abjad
- Language of origin: Arabic language
- Sound values: s
- Alphabetical position: 12

History
- Development: 𐤔: 𐡔; 𐢜 ,𐢝; س

Other
- Writing direction: Right-to-left

The Arabic letter س sīn /s/ (Arabic: سِينْ, sīn or seen /siːn/) is the 12th letter in the common Hijā'i order, and the 15th letter in the Abjadi order (corresponding to the 15th letter Phoenician letter Samekh). Based on Semitic linguistics, Samekh has no surviving descendant in the Arabic alphabet, and that sīn is derived from Phoenician šīn 𐤔 rather than Phoenician sāmek 𐤎, but unlike the Aramaic 𐡔 sīn/šīn and the Hebrew ש sīn/šīn, Arabic س sīn /s/ is considered a completely separate letter from ش šīn /ʃ/, and is written thus:

Position in word:	Isolated	Final	Medial	Initial
Glyph form: (Help)	س	ـس	ـسـ	سـ

The history of the letters expressing sibilants in the various Semitic alphabets is somewhat complicated, due to different mergers between Proto-Semitic phonemes. As usually reconstructed, there are four plain Proto-Semitic coronal voiceless fricative phonemes (not counting emphatic ones) that evolved into the various voiceless sibilants of its daughter languages, as follows:

Proto-Semitic		Ancient South Arabian	Ancient North Arabian	Modern South Arabian languages	Arabic		Aramaic		Hebrew		Phoenician		Ge'ez	
s₃ (s)	[s] / [ts]	𐩯	𐪏	/s/	س	/s/	ס	/s/	ס	/s/	𐤎	/s/	ሰ	/s/
s₁ (š)	[ʃ] / [s]	𐩪	𐪊	/ʃ/; sometimes /h/	س	/s/	ש	/ʃ/	ש	/ʃ/	𐤔	/ʃ/	ሰ	/s/
ṯ	[θ]	𐩻	𐪛	/θ/	ث	/θ/	ת	/t/	ש	/ʃ/	𐤔	/ʃ/	ሰ	/s/
s₂ (ś)	[ɬ] / [tɬ]	𐩦	𐪆	/ɬ/	ش	/ʃ/	ס	/s/	ש	/s/	𐤔	/ʃ/	ሠ	/ɬ/

== Order ==
In the Maghrebian abjad sequence (quoted in apparently earliest authorities and considered older by Michael Macdonald):

- ص Ṣād replaces Samekh at 15th position and acquires the numerical value of 60;
  - ض Ḍād, a variant of ص ṣād, is at the 18th position and has the numerical value of 90;
- س Sīn is still at its original 21st position and retains the numerical value of 300.

== See also ==
- Shin (letter)
- Samekh (letter)
