= Nun (letter) =

Fourteenth letter of many Semitic alphabets

← Mem Nun Samekh →
- Phoenician: 𐤍
- Hebrew: נן
- Samaritan: ࠍ
- Aramaic: 𐡍
- Syriac: ܢ
- Nabataean: 𐢕𐢔
- Arabic: ن
- South Arabian: 𐩬
- Geʽez: ነ
- North Arabian: 𐪌
- Ugaritic: 𐎐
- Phonemic representation: n
- Position in alphabet: 14
- Numerical value: 50

Alphabetic derivatives of the Phoenician
- Greek: Ν
- Latin: N
- Cyrillic: Н

Nun is the fourteenth letter of the Semitic abjads, including Phoenician nūn 𐤍, Hebrew nūn נ, Aramaic nūn 𐡍, Syriac nūn ܢ, and Arabic nūn ن (in abjadi order). Its numerical value is 50. It is the third letter in Thaana (ނ), pronounced as "noonu". In all languages, it represents the alveolar nasal /n/. It is related to the Ancient North Arabian 𐪌, South Arabian 𐩬, and Ge'ez ነ.

The Phoenician letter gave rise to the Greek nu (Ν), Etruscan, Latin N, and Cyrillic Н.

== Origins ==
Nun is believed to descend from an Egyptian hieroglyph of a snake (the Hebrew word for snake, נָחָשׁ (nakhash), begins with Nun) or eel. Some have hypothesized a hieroglyph of fish in water as its origin (In Aramaic and Akkadian nun means fish, and in Arabic, nūn means large fish or whale). The Phoenician letter was also named nūn "fish", but this name has been suggested to descend from a hypothetical Proto-Canaanite word naḥš "snake", based on the letter name in Ethiopic, ultimately from a hieroglyph representing a snake,

I10

== Arabic nūn ==
Nūn نون
- ن

Usage
- Writing system: Arabic script
- Type: Abjad
- Language of origin: Arabic language
- Sound values: n
- Alphabetical position: 25

History
- Development: 𓆓: 𐤫; 𐡍; 𐢔, 𐢕; ں; ن
- Descendants: ݨ ں ڻ ڼ

Other
- Writing direction: Right-to-left

The letter is named nūn, and is written is several ways depending on its position in the word:

Position in word:	Isolated	Final	Medial	Initial
Naskh glyph form: (Help)	ن	ـن	ـنـ	نـ
Nastaliq glyph form:	ن	ــــن	ــــنــــ	نــــ

Some examples on its uses in Modern Standard Arabic:

Nūn is used as a suffix indicating feminine plural verb conjugations; for example هِيَ تَكْتُب hiya taktub ("she writes") becomes هُنَّ يَكْتُبْنَ hunna yaktubna ("they [feminine] write").

Nūn is also used as the prefix for first-person plural imperfective/present tense verbs. Thus هُوَ يَكْتُب huwa yaktub ("he writes") → نَحْنُ نَكْتُب naḥnu naktub ("we write").

=== Punjabi/Saraiki nūn ===
It is retroflex nasal consonantal sound in some languages. Its symbol in the International Phonetic Alphabet is ⟨ɳ⟩, formed by adding a rightward hook to the bottom of ⟨n⟩, the symbol for the corresponding alveolar consonant. IIt is similar to ݨ, combining nūn and rre ڑ: for example کݨ مݨ، چھݨ چھݨ، ونڄݨ۔, which is the velar nasal ⟨ŋ⟩.

=== Social media campaign (2014) ===
After the fall of Mosul, ISIL demanded Assyrian Christians in the city to convert to Islam, pay tribute, or face execution. ISIL troops begun spray painting homes of Christian residents with the letter nūn for naṣrānī (نصراني; plural naṣārā نصارى, "Nazarene"), a disparaging Arabic term for Christians. Thousands were forced to abandon their homes and land, including Christians, Yazidis (given the choice of conversion or death), Shi'a Muslims, and Muslims loyal to other Islamic nations considered apostates by ISIL.

In response to the persecution of Christians and Yazidis by ISIL, an international social media campaign was launched to raise global awareness, symbolized by the letter ن (nun)—the mark painted by ISIL. Some Christians changed their profile pictures to the letter ن as a symbol of support, calling it the "Mark of the Nazarene".

Naṣārā/nosrim designates Christians in Arabic, Aramaic and Hebrew, although the more common term for Christians in Modern Standard Arabic is masihi (مسيحي, plural مسيحيون).

=== Jawi nya ===
In the Jawi alphabet, the letter nya is a modified form of the letter nūn with two additional dots. However, if nya is initial or medial, its dots will be three dots below instead of three dots above, similarly how the Persian letter pe works on medial or initial form due to its similar looking. This letter also looks like tsa in general. This letter is thus written as:

Position in word:	Isolated	Final	Medial	Initial
Glyph form: (Help)	ڽ	ـڽ	ـڽـ	ڽـ

The letter nya is also a suffix for indirect object belonging to him/her/it. The example is رومهڽ (rumahnya in Rumi alphabet), which means his/her/its house.

== Hebrew nun ==
Orthographic variants
position in word	Various print fonts			Cursive Hebrew	Solitreo	Rashi script
position in word	Serif	Sans-serif	Monospaced	Cursive Hebrew	Solitreo	Rashi script
non final	נ	נ	נ			
final	ן	ן	ן			

Hebrew spelling: נוּן

The letter in its final position appears with or without a top hook on different sans-serif fonts, for example

- Arial, DejaVu Sans, Liberation Sans, Arimo: ן
- Tahoma, Noto Sans Hebrew, Alef, Heebo: ן

=== Pronunciation ===
Nun represents an alveolar nasal, (IPA: /n/), like the English letter N.

=== Variations ===
Nun, like Kaph, Mem, Pe, and Tzadi, has a final form, used at the end of words. Its shape changes from נ to ן. There are also nine instances of an inverted nun (׆) in the Tanakh.

=== Significance ===
In gematria, Nun represents the number 50. Its final form represents 700 but this is rarely used, Tav and Shin (400+300) being used instead.

As in Arabic, nun as an abbreviation can stand for neqevah, feminine. In medieval Rabbinic writings, Nun Sophit (Final Nun) stood for "Son of" (Hebrew ben).

Nun is also one of the seven letters which receive a special crown (called a tag: plural tagin ) when written in a Sefer Torah. See Tag (Hebrew writing), Shin, Ayin, Teth, Gimmel, Zayin, and Tzadi.

In the game of dreidel, a rolled Nun passes play to the next player with no other action.

== Syriac nun ==
Position in word:	Isolated	Final	Medial	Initial
Glyph form: (Help)	ܢ	ـܢ	ـܢـ	ܢـ

== Character encodings ==
Character information
Preview	נ		ן		ن		ࢽ		ܢ		ࠍ	
Unicode name	HEBREW LETTER NUN		HEBREW LETTER FINAL NUN		ARABIC LETTER NOON		ARABIC LETTER AFRICAN NOON		SYRIAC LETTER NUN		SAMARITAN LETTER NUN	
Encodings	decimal	hex	dec	hex	dec	hex	dec	hex	dec	hex	dec	hex
Unicode	1504	U+05E0	1503	U+05DF	1606	U+0646	2237	U+08BD	1826	U+0722	2061	U+080D
UTF-8	215 160	D7 A0	215 159	D7 9F	217 134	D9 86	224 162 189	E0 A2 BD	220 162	DC A2	224 160 141	E0 A0 8D
Numeric character reference	&#1504;	&#x5E0;	&#1503;	&#x5DF;	&#1606;	&#x646;	&#2237;	&#x8BD;	&#1826;	&#x722;	&#2061;	&#x80D;

Character information
Preview	𐎐		𐡍		𐤍	
Unicode name	UGARITIC LETTER NUN		IMPERIAL ARAMAIC LETTER NUN		PHOENICIAN LETTER NUN	
Encodings	decimal	hex	dec	hex	dec	hex
Unicode	66448	U+10390	67661	U+1084D	67853	U+1090D
UTF-8	240 144 142 144	F0 90 8E 90	240 144 161 141	F0 90 A1 8D	240 144 164 141	F0 90 A4 8D
UTF-16	55296 57232	D800 DF90	55298 56397	D802 DC4D	55298 56589	D802 DD0D
Numeric character reference	&#66448;	&#x10390;	&#67661;	&#x1084D;	&#67853;	&#x1090D;

== See also ==
- Nunation
- Setaceous Hebrew Character (Xestia c-nigrum) - a moth of the family Noctuidae.
