= Northwest Semitic languages =

Division of the Semitic languages of the Levant

Northwest Semitic
- Levantine
- Geographic distribution: Concentrated in the Middle East
- Linguistic classification: Afro-Asiatic: Semitic; West Semitic; Central Semitic; Northwest Semitic
- Subdivisions: Aramaic; Canaanite; Ugaritic †; Amorite †; Samalian †; South Gileadite †; ? Taymanitic †; ? Sutean †

Language codes
- Glottolog: nort3165

Northwest Semitic is a division of the Semitic languages comprising indigenous languages of the Levant. It emerged from Proto-Semitic in the Early Bronze Age. It is first attested in proper names identified as Amorite in the Middle Bronze Age. The oldest coherent texts are in Ugaritic, dating to the Late Bronze Age, which by the time of the Bronze Age collapse are joined by Old Aramaic, and by the Iron Age by Sutean and the Canaanite languages (Hebrew, Phoenician–Punic, Edomite and Moabite).

The term was coined by Carl Brockelmann in 1908, who separated Fritz Hommel's 1883 classification of Semitic languages into Northwest (Canaanite and Aramaic), East Semitic (Akkadian, its Assyrian and Babylonian dialects, Eblaite) and Southwest (Arabic, Old South Arabian languages and Abyssinian).

Brockelmann's Canaanite sub-group includes Ugaritic, Phoenician and Hebrew. Some scholars now regard Ugaritic either as belonging to a separate branch of Northwest Semitic (alongside Canaanite) or a dialect of Amorite.

Central Semitic is a proposed intermediate group comprising Northwest Semitic and Arabic. Central Semitic is either a subgroup of West Semitic or a top-level division of Semitic alongside East Semitic and South Semitic. SIL Ethnologue in its system of classification (of living languages only) eliminates Northwest Semitic entirely by joining Canaanite and Arabic in a "South-Central" group which together with Aramaic forms Central Semitic. South Gileadite and Samalian have been identified as language varieties falling outside Aramaic proper but with some similarities to it, possibly in an "Aramoid" or "Syrian" subgroup.

It is clear that the Taymanitic script expressed a distinct linguistic variety that is not Arabic and not closely related to Hismaic or Safaitic, while it can tentatively be suggested that it was more closely related to Northwest Semitic.

== Historical development ==
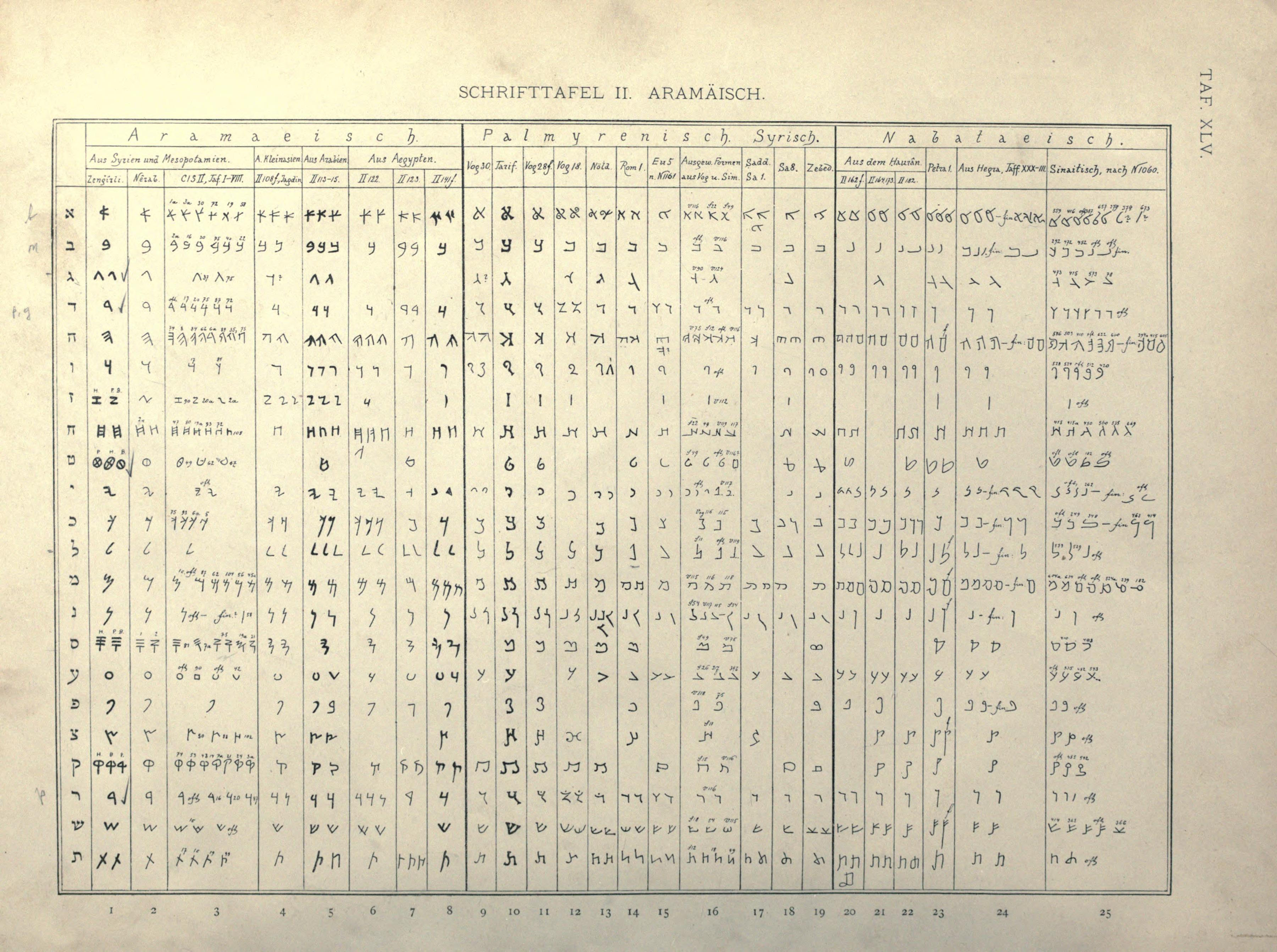
Aramaic alphabets

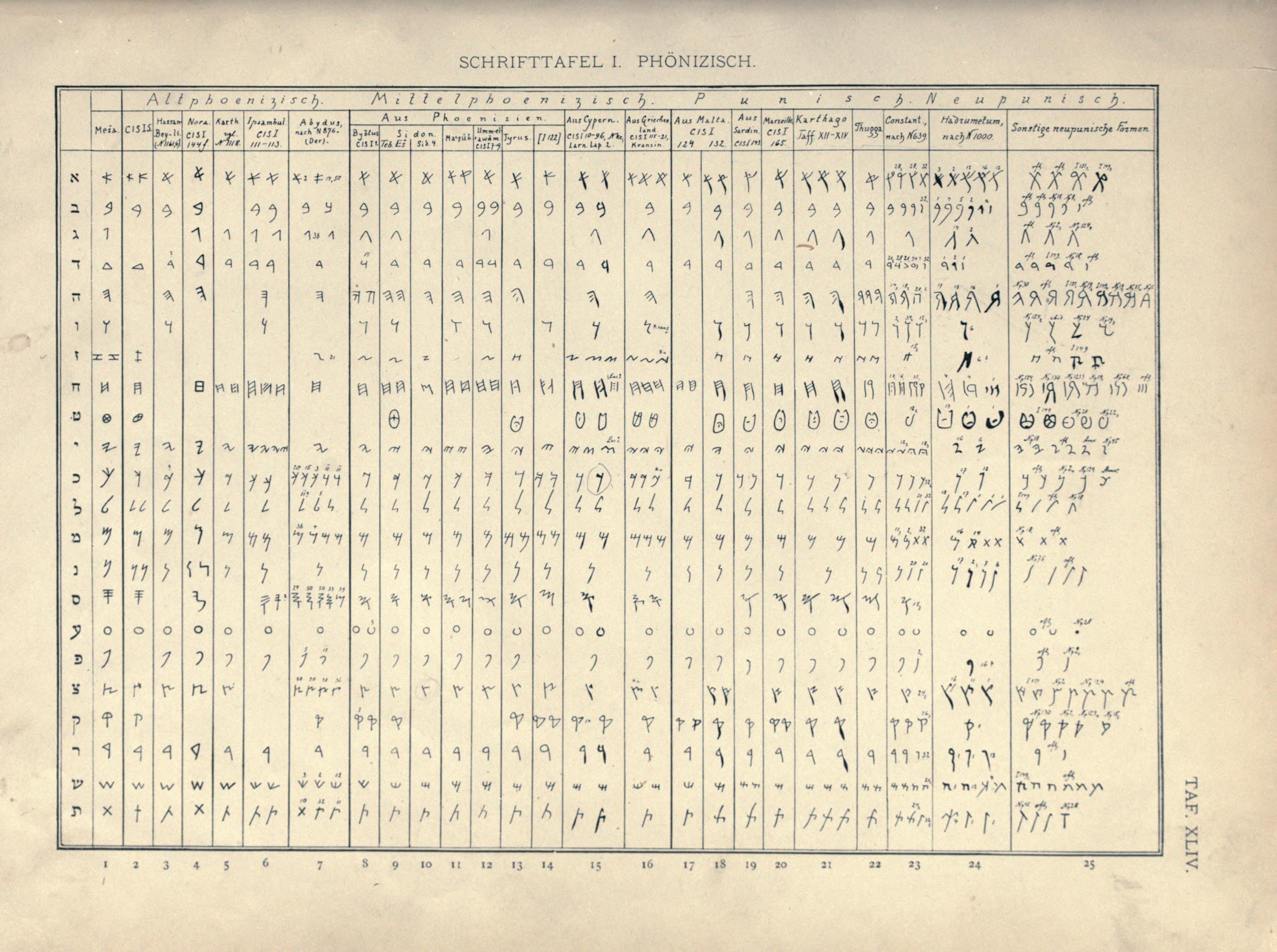
Phoenician alphabets

Comparison of Northwest Semitic scripts, by Mark Lidzbarski in 1898

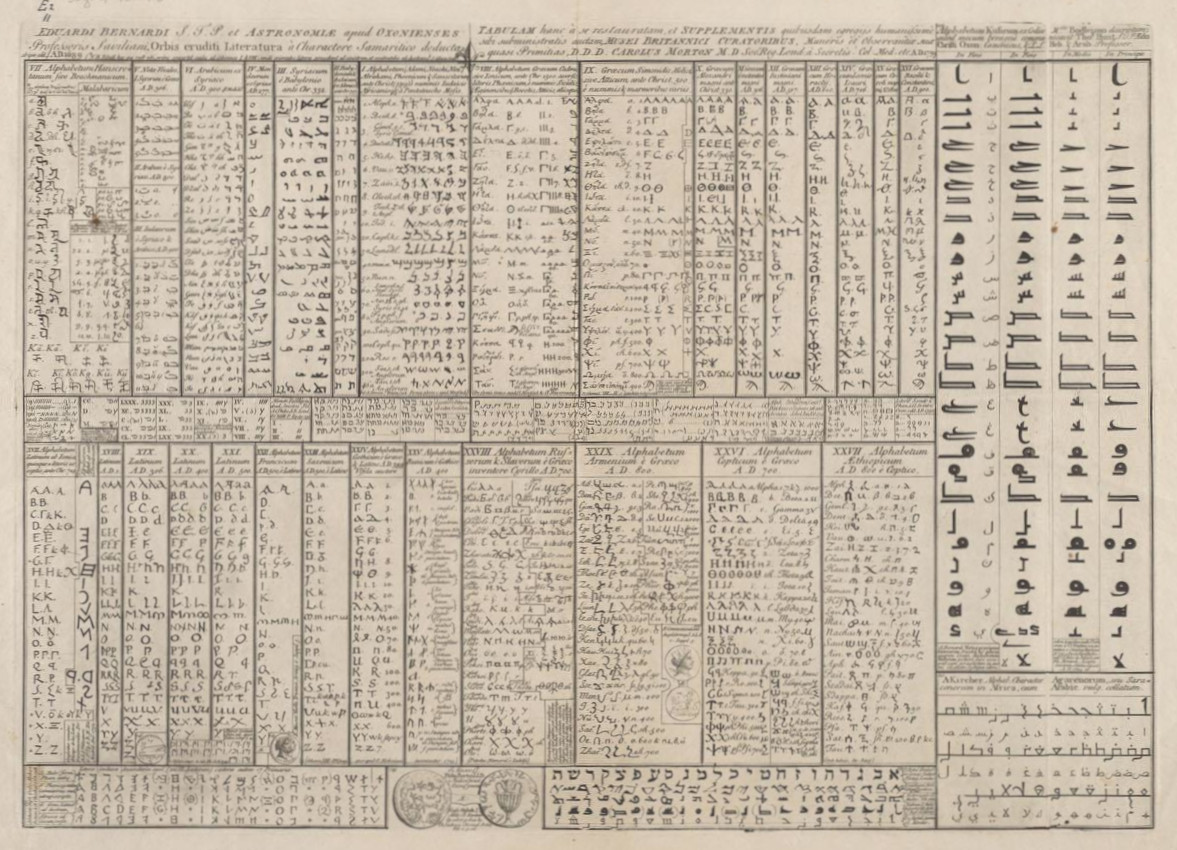
Charles Morton's 1759 updated version of Edward Bernard's "Orbis eruditi", comparing all known alphabets as of 1689, including Northwest Semitic which is described as "Adami, Noachi, Nini, Abrahami, Phoenicum et Samaritarum ante Christe (5509) a nummis Iudaicis Africanisque Pentateucho Mosis"

The time period for the split of Northwest Semitic from Proto-Semitic or from other Semitic groups is uncertain. Richard C. Steiner suggested in 2011 that the earliest attestation of Northwest Semitic is to be found in snake spells from the Egyptian Pyramid Texts, dating to the mid-third millennium BC. However, other scholars question these findings. Amorite personal names and words in Akkadian and Egyptian texts from the late third millennium to the mid-second millennium BC and the language of the Proto-Sinaitic inscriptions dated to the first half of the second millennium otherwise constitute the earliest traces of Northwest Semitic, the first Northwest Semitic language attested in full being Ugaritic in the 14th century BC.

During the early 1st millennium, the Phoenician language was spread throughout the Mediterranean by Phoenician colonists, most notably to Carthage in today's Tunisia. The Phoenician alphabet is of fundamental importance in human history as the source and ancestor of the Greek alphabet, the later Latin alphabet, the Aramaic (Square Hebrew), Syriac, and Arabic writing systems, Germanic runes, and ultimately Cyrillic.

From the 8th century BC, the use of Imperial Aramaic by the Neo-Assyrian Empire (935–608 BC) and the succeeding Neo-Babylonian Empire (612–539 BC) and Achaemenid Empire (539–332 BC), a form of the Aramaic language, spread throughout the Northwest Semitic region of the Levant, northern regions of the Arabian peninsula and southern regions of Anatolia, and gradually drove most of the other Northwest Semitic languages to extinction. The ancient Judaeans adopted Aramaic for daily use, and parts of the Tanakh are written in it. Hebrew was preserved, however, as a Jewish liturgical language and language of scholarship, and resurrected in the 19th century, with modern adaptations, to become the Modern Hebrew language of the State of Israel.

After the Muslim conquests of the 7th century, Arabic began to gradually replace Aramaic throughout the region. Classical Syriac-Aramaic survives today as the liturgical language of the Assyrian Church of the East, Syriac Orthodox Church, Chaldean Catholic Church, and other churches of Syriac Christians. It is spoken in modern dialects with an estimated one million fluent speakers by endangered indigenous populations scattered throughout the Middle East, most commonly by the Assyrians, Gnostic Mandeans, the Arameans (Syriacs) of Maaloula and Jubb'adin, and Mizrahi Jews. There is also an Aramaic substratum in Levantine and Mesopotamian Arabic.

== Phonology ==
=== Sound changes ===
Phonologically, Ugaritic lost the sound *ṣ́, replacing it with /sˁ/ (ṣ) (the same shift occurred in Canaanite and Akkadian). That this same sound became /ʕ/ in Aramaic (although in Ancient Aramaic, it was written with qoph), suggests that Ugaritic is not the parent language of the group. An example of this sound shift can be seen in the word for earth: Ugaritic /ʔarsˁ/ (’arṣ), Punic /ʔarsˁ/ (’arṣ), Tiberian Hebrew /ʔɛrɛsˁ/ (’ereṣ), Biblical Hebrew /ʔarsˁ/ (’arṣ) and Aramaic /ʔarʕaː/ (’ar‘ā’).

The vowel shift from *aː to /oː/ distinguishes Canaanite from Ugaritic. Also, in the Canaanite group, the series of Semitic interdental fricatives become sibilants: *ð (ḏ), *θ (ṯ) and *θ̣ (ṱ) became /z/, /ʃ/ (š) and /sˤ/ (ṣ) respectively. The effect of this sound shift can be seen by comparing the following words:

shift	Ugaritic	Aramaic	Biblical Hebrew	translation
*ð (ḏ)→/z/	𐎏𐎐𐎁 ḏanabu	דנבא danḇā	זנב zānāḇ	tail
*θ (ṯ)→/ʃ/ (š)	𐎘𐎍𐎘 ṯalāṯu	תלת təlāṯ	שלש šālōš	three
*θ̣ (ẓ)→/sˤ/ (ṣ)	𐎑𐎍𐎍 ẓillu	טללא ṭillālā	צל ṣēl	shadow

=== Vowels ===
Proto-Northwest Semitic had three contrastive vowel qualities and a length distinction, resulting in six vocalic phonemes: *a, *ā, *i, *ī, *u, and *ū. While *aw, *ay, *iw, *iy, *uw, and *uy are often referred to as diphthongs, they do not seem to have had a different status as such, rather being a normal sequence of a short vowel and a glide.

=== Consonants ===
Proto-Northwest Semitic consonant phonemes
Type	Manner	Voicing	Labial	Interdental	Alveolar	Lateral	Postalveolar	Palatal	Velar/Uvular	Pharyngeal	Glottal
Obstruent	Stop	voiceless	*p [p]		*t [t]				*k [k]		
Obstruent	Stop	emphatic			*ṭ [tˤ]				*q/ḳ [kˤ]		*ʼ, ˀ [ʔ]
Obstruent	Stop	voiced	*b [b]		*d [d]				*g [ɡ]		
Obstruent	Fricative	voiceless		*ṯ [θ]	*s [t͡s]	*ś [ɬ]	*š [s~ʃ]		*ḫ [x~χ]	*ḥ [ħ]	*h [h]
Obstruent	Fricative	emphatic		*ṯ̣/θ̣/ẓ [t͡θˤ]	*ṣ [t͡sˤ]	*ṣ́/ḏ̣ [t͡ɬˤ]					
Obstruent	Fricative	voiced		*ḏ [ð]	*z [d͡z]				*ġ/ǵ [ɣ~ʁ]	*ʻ, ˤ [ʕ]	
Resonant	Trill				*r [r]						
Resonant	Approximant		*w [w]			*l [l]		*y [j]			
Resonant	Nasal		*m [m]		*n [n]						

Suchard proposes that: "*s, both from original *s and original *ṯ, then shifted further back to a postalveolar *š, while deaffrication of *ts and *dz to *s and *z gave these phonemes their Hebrew values, as well as merging original *dz with original *ḏ. In fact, original *s may have been realized as anything between [s] and [ʃ]; both values are attested in foreign transcriptions of early Northwest Semitic languages".

=== Emphatics ===
In Proto-Northwest Semitic the emphatics were articulated with pharyngealization. Its shift to backing (as opposed to Proto-Semitic glottalization of emphatics) has been considered a Central Semitic innovation.

According to Faber, the assimilation *-ṣt->-ṣṭ- in the Dt stem in Hebrew (hiṣṭaddēḳ ‘he declared himself righteous’) suggests backing rather than glottalization. The same assimilation is attested in Aramaic (yiṣṭabba ‘he will be moistened’).

== Grammar ==
=== Nouns ===
Three cases can be reconstructed for Proto-Northwest Semitic nouns (nominative, accusative, genitive), two genders (masculine, feminine) and three numbers (single, dual, plural).

Number/case	‘dog(s)’ (m.)	‘bitch(es)’ (f.)
sg.nominative	*kalbu(m)	*kalbatu(m)
sg.genitive	*kalbi(m)	*kalbati(m)
sg.accusative	*kalba(m)	*kalbata(m)
du.nominative	*kalbā(na)	*kalbatā(na)
du.genitive/accusative	*kalbay(na)	*kalbatay(na)
pl.nominative	*kalabū(na)	*kalabātu(m)
pl.genitive/accusative	*kalabī(na)	*kalabāti(m)

=== Pronouns ===
Proto-Northwest Semitic pronouns had 2 genders and 3 grammatical cases.

	independent nominative	enclitic		
	independent nominative	accusative	genitive	nominative
1.sg.	*ʔanāku/ *ʔana	*-nī	*-ī, *-ya	*-tu
2.sg.masc.	*ʔanta	*-ka		*-ta
2.sg.fem.	*ʔanti	*-ki		*-ti
3.sg.masc.	*hūʔa	*-hu		*-a
3.sg.fem.	*hīʔa	*-hā		*-at
1.pl.	*naḥnu/ *naḥnā	*-nā		
2.pl.masc.	*ʔantum	*-kum		*-tum
2.pl.fem.	*ʔantin	*-kin		*-tin
3.pl.masc.	*hum(ū)	*-hum		*-ū
3.pl.fem.	*hin(na)	*-hin		*-ā

=== Numerals ===
Reconstruction of Proto-Northwest Semitic numbers.

Number	Masculine	Feminine
One	*ʔaḥadum	*ʔaḥattum
Two	*ṯnāna	*ṯintāna
Three	*ṯalāṯatum	*ṯalāṯum
Four	*ʔarbaʕatum	*ʔarbaʕum
Five	*ḫamisatum	*ḫamisum
Six	*siṯṯatum	*siṯṯum
Seven	*sabʕatum	*sabʕum
Eight	*ṯamāniyatum	*ṯamāniyum
Nine	*tisʕatum	*tisʕum
Ten	*ʕaśaratum	*ʕaśrum

=== Verbs ===
Paradigm of the strong verb (G-stem)
			Suffix conjugation (Perfect)		Prefix conjugations (Imperfect)	
1st person		singular	*qaṭal-tu	'I have killed'	*ʔa-qṭul(-u/-a)	'I will kill'
1st person		plural	*qaṭal-nā	'we have killed'	*na-qṭul(-u/-a)	'we will kill'
2nd person	singular	masc.	*qaṭal-ta	'you have killed'	*ta-qṭul(-u/-a)	'you will kill'
2nd person	singular	fem.	*qaṭal-ti	'you have killed'	*ta-qṭul-ī(-na)	'you will kill'
2nd person	plural	masc.	*qaṭal-tum	'you have killed'	*ta-qṭul-ū(-na)	'you will kill'
2nd person	plural	fem.	*qaṭal-tin	'you have killed'	*ta-qṭul-na	'you will kill'
3rd person	singular	masc.	*qaṭal-a	'he has killed'	*ya-qṭul(-u/-a)	'he will kill'
3rd person	singular	fem.	*qaṭal-at	'she has killed'	*ta-qṭul(-u/-a)	'she will kill'
3rd person	plural	masc.	*qaṭal-ū	'they have killed'	*ya-qṭul-ū(-na)	'they will kill'
3rd person	plural	fem.	*qaṭal-ā	'they have killed'	*ta-qṭul-na	'they will kill'

The G fientive or G-stem (Hebrew qal) is the basic, most common, unmarked stem. The G-stem expresses events. The vowel of the prefix of the prefix conjugations in Proto-Northwest Semitic was *-a- and the stem was *-qṭul- or *-qṭil-, as in *ya-qṭul-u 'he will kill', while the stem of the suffix conjugation had two *a vowels, as in *qaṭal-a 'he has killed'.

The G stative is like the fientive but expressing states instead of events. For the prefix conjugation of stative roots, the vowel of the prefix was *-i- and it contained an *a vowel, e.g. *yi-kbad-u 'he will become heavy', while the second vowel of the suffix conjugation was either *-i-, as in *kabid-a 'he is/was/will be heavy', or *-u-, as in *ʕamuq-a 'it is/was/will be deep'. Whether the G-stem stative suffix conjugation has *i or *u in the stem is lexically determined.

The N-stem (Hebrew nip̄ʕal) is marked by a prefixed *n(a)-. It is mediopassive which is a grammatical voice that subsumes the meanings of both the middle voice and the passive voice. In other words, it expresses a range of meanings where the subject is the patient of the verb, e.g. passive, medial, and reciprocal. The stem of the suffix conjugation is *naqṭal-, and the stem of the prefix conjugations is *-nqaṭil-; as is the case with stative G-stem verbs, the prefix vowel is *-i-, resulting in forms like *yi-nqaṭil-u 'he will be killed'.

The D-stem (Hebrew piʕel) is marked by gemination of the second radical in all forms. It has a range of different meanings, mostly transitive. The stem of the suffix conjugation is *qaṭṭil-, and the same stem is used for the prefix conjugations. It is not clear whether the Proto-Northwest-Semitic prefix vowel should be reconstructed as *-u-, the form inherited from Proto-Semitic (i.e. *yuqaṭṭil-u), or as *-a-, which is somewhat supported by evidence from Ugaritic and Hebrew (*yaqaṭṭil-u).

The C-stem (Hebrew hip̄ʕil) more often than not expresses a causative meaning. The most likely reconstructions are *haqṭil- (from older *saqṭil-) for the stem of the suffix conjugation and *-saqṭil- for the stem of the prefix conjugations. The reconstructed prefix vowel is the same as that of the D-stem, and similarly, the participle is to be reconstructed as *musaqṭilum.

All of the stems listed here, except the N-stem, could bring forth further derivation. The "internal passive stems" (Gp, Dp, and Cp; Hebrew passive qal, puʕal, and hɔp̄ʕal) aren't marked by affixes, but express their passivity through a different vowel pattern. The Gp prefix conjugation can be reconstructed as *yu-qṭal-u 'he will be killed'. Reflexive or reciprocal meanings can be expressed by the t-stems, formed with a *t which was either infixed after the first radical (Gt, Ct) or prefixed before it (tD).

The precise reconstruction are uncertain.

Proto-Northwest-Semitic verbal stems
	G fientive	G stative	D	C
perfect	*qaṭal-a	*kabid-a	*qaṭṭil-a	*ha-qṭil-a
imperfect	*ya-qṭul-u	*yi-kbad-u	*yV-qaṭṭil-u	*yVsa-qṭil-u
participle	*qāṭil-um	*kabid-um	*mu-qaṭṭil-um	*musa-qṭil-um
	Gp	N	Dp	Cp
perfect	*quṭVl-a	*na-qṭal-a	*quṭṭVl-a	*hu-qṭVl-a
imperfect	*yu-qṭal-u	*yin-qaṭil-u	*yu-qVṭṭal-u	*yusV-qṭal-u
participle	*qaṭīl-um, *qaṭūl-um	*na-qṭal-um or *mun-qaṭil-um?	*mu-qVṭṭal-um	*musV-qṭal-um
	Gt		tD	Ct
perfect	*qtaṭVl-a?		*ta-qaṭṭVl-a	*sta-qṭVl-a?
imperfect	*yi-qtaṭVl-u		*yVt-qaṭṭVl-u	*yVsta-qṭVl-u
participle	*mu-qtaṭVl-um		*mut-qaṭṭVl-um	*musta-qṭVl-um

==== Conjunctions and Prepositions ====
- *wa, 'and'
- *pa/ʔap, 'and then, and so'
- *ʔaw, 'or'
- *huʼāti and *hiʼāti, direct object markers
- *ha, 'to, for'
- *ka also *kī, (and *kaj?) 'like, as'
- *bal, 'without, non-'
- *bi, 'in, with'
- *la, 'to, for' (dat/dir)
- *min(V), 'from'
- *ʕad(aj), 'up to, until'
- *ʕal(aj), 'on, against'
- *jiθ, 'there is/are'

== Bibliography ==
- Blau, J. 1968. "Some Difficulties in the Reconstruction of 'Proto-Hebrew' and 'Proto-Canaanite'," in In Memoriam Paul Kahle. BZAW, 103. pp. 29–43
- Cross, F. M. 1965. “The Development of the Jewish Scripts,” in The Bible and the Ancient Near East: Essays in Honor of W. F. Albright, ed. G. E. Wright. New York. Reprinted 1965, Anchor Book Edition; New York, pp. 133–202.
- Cross, F. M. 1967. “The Origin and Early Evolution of the Alphabet,” EI 5: 8*-24*.
- Cross, F. M. 1982. “Alphabets and pots: Reflections on typological method in the dating of human artifacts,” MAARAV 3: 121–136.
- Cross, F. M. 1989. “The Invention and Development of the Alphabet,” in The Origins of Writing (ed. W. M. Senner; Lincoln: University of Nebraska), pp. 77–90.
- Cross, F. M. and Freedman, D. N. 1952. Early Hebrew Orthography: A Study of the Epigraphic Evidence New Haven: American Oriental Society.
- Daniels, Peter. 1996. The World’s Writing Systems. New York: Oxford.
- de Moor, Johannes C. 1988. "Narrative Poetry in Canaan," UF 20:149–171.
- Donner, H. and Rollig, W. 1962–64. Kanaanäische und aramäische Inschriften. 3 volumes. Wiesbaden. (5th ed.)
- Driver, G. R. 1976. Semitic Writing: From Pictograph to Alphabet. 3rd edition. London.
- Garbini, G. 1960. Il Semitico di nord-ovest. (And a critique by E.Y. Kutscher, JSS 10 (1965):21–51.)
- Garnier, Romain; Jacques, Guillaume (2012). "A neglected phonetic law: The assimilation of pretonic yod to a following coronal in North-West Semitic". Bulletin of the School of Oriental and African Studies. 75 (1): 135–145. CiteSeerX 10.1.1.395.1033. doi:10.1017/s0041977x11001261. S2CID 16649580.
- Garr, R. 1985. Dialect Geography of Syria-Palestine, 1000-586 B.C.E. Philadelphia: UPenn.
- Gelb, I. J. 1961. “The Early History of the West Semitic Peoples,” JCS 15:27-47.
- Gelb, I. J. 1963. A Study of Writing. 2nd edition. Chicago.
- Gibson, J. C. L. 1971–87. Textbook of Syrian Semitic Inscriptions. 3 Vols. Oxford: Clarendon.
- Ginsberg, H. L. 1970. “The Northwest Semitic Languages,” in The World History of the Jewish People, volume 1/2: Patriarches. Tel Aviv.
- Greenfield, J. C. 1969. “Amurrite, Ugaritic and Canaanite,” in Proceedings of the International Conference of Semitic Studies. Jerusalem. pp. 92–101.
- Halpern, B. 1987. “Dialect Distribution in Canaan and the Deir Alla Inscriptions,” in “Working with No Data”: Semitic and Egyptian Studies Presented to Thomas O. Lambdin. Ed. D. M. Golomb. Winona Lake, IN: Eisenbrauns. pp. 119–39.
- Harris, Z. 1939. Development of the Canaanite Dialects. AOS, 16. New Haven: AOS.
- Herr, Larry G. 1980. "The Formal Scripts of Iron Age Transjordan," BASOR 238:21–34.
- Hoftijzer, J. and Jongeling, K. 1995. Dictionary of the North-West Semitic inscriptions. 2 volumes. Leiden/New York: Brill. Not including Ugaritic.
- Huehnergard, J. 1990. "Remarks on the Classification of the Northwest Semitic Languages," in The Balaam Text from Deir Alla Re-evaluated: proceedings of the international symposium held at Leiden, 21–24 August 1989. pp. 282–93.
- Kaufman, S. A. 1988. “The Classification of North West Semitic Dialects of the Biblical Period and Some Implications Thereof,” in Proceedings of the Ninth World Congress of Jewish Studies (Panel Sessions: Hebrew and Aramaic Languages). Jerusalem: World Union of Jewish Studies. pp. 41–57.
- Moran, William L. 1961. “The Hebrew Language in its Northwest Semitic Background,” in The Bible and the Ancient Near East: Essays in Honor of W. F. Albright, ed. G. E. Wright. New York. Reprinted 1965, Anchor Book Edition; New York, pp. 59–84.
- Moran, William L. 1975. “The Syrian Scribe of the Jerusalem Amarna Letters,” in Unity and Diversity: Essays in the History, Literature, and Religion of the Ancient Near East (ed. H. Goedicke and J. J. M. Roberts; Baltimore/London: Johns Hopkins University Press) 146–166.
- Moscati, Sabatino, ed. 1969. An Introduction to the Comparative Grammar of the Semitic Languages: Phonology and Morphology. Porta Linguarum Orientalium, ns, 6. Wiesbaden: Otto Harrassowitz.
- Naveh, J. 1987. Early History of the Alphabet: An Introduction to West Semitic Epigraphy and Palaeography. 2nd edition. Jerusalem: Magnes. Especially sections on West Semitic.
- Parker, Simon B. 1997. Stories in Scripture and Inscriptions: Comparative Studies on Narratives in Northwest Semitic Inscriptions and the Hebrew Bible. Oxford: Oxford University Press.
- Rabin, C. 1971. "Semitic Languages," Encyclopaedia Judaica, volume 14, pp. 1149–57.
- Rabin, C. 1991. Semitic Languages (Jerusalem: Bialik). [in Hebrew]
- Rainey, A. F. 1986 “The Ancient Hebrew Prefix Conjugation in the Light of Amarnah Canaanite,” Hebrew Studies 27:1–19.
- Rainey, A. F. 1990. “The Prefix Conjugation Patterns of Early Northwest Semitic,” pp. 407–420 in Abusch, Tz., Huehnergard, J. and Steinkeller, P., eds. Lingering over Words, Studies in Ancient Near Eastern Literature in Honor of William L. Moran. Atlanta: Scholars.
- Renz, J. 1995. Handbuch der althebräischen Epigraphik. 3 volumes. Darmstadt.
- Suchard, B. 2019. "The Development of the Biblical Hebrew Vowels: Including a Concise Historical Morphology". Brill, pp. 37–50, 232–252
- Vaughn, A. 1999. "Palaeographic Dating of Judean Seals and Its Significance for Biblical Research", BASOR, 313:43–64.
