= Ancient South Arabian script =

Script for Old South Arabian languages

Ancient South Arabian script 𐩣𐩯𐩬𐩵
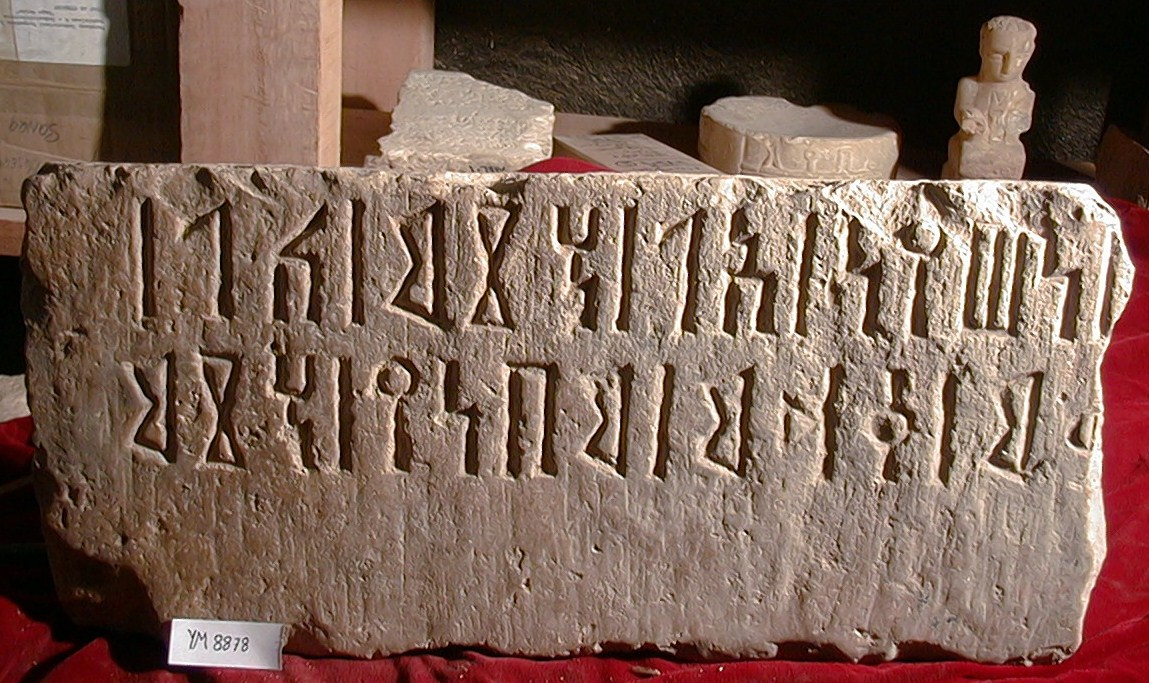
- Script type: Abjad
- Period: From late 2nd millennium BCE to 6th century CE
- Direction: Right-to-left, boustrophedon
- Languages: Old South Arabian, Ge'ez

Related scripts
- Parent systems: Egyptian hieroglyphs: Proto-Sinaitic; South Semitic; Ancient South Arabian script
- Child systems: Geʽez
- Sister systems: Ancient North Arabian

ISO 15924
- ISO 15924: Sarb (105), Old South Arabian

Unicode
- Unicode alias: Old South Arabian
- Unicode range: U+10A60–U+10A7F

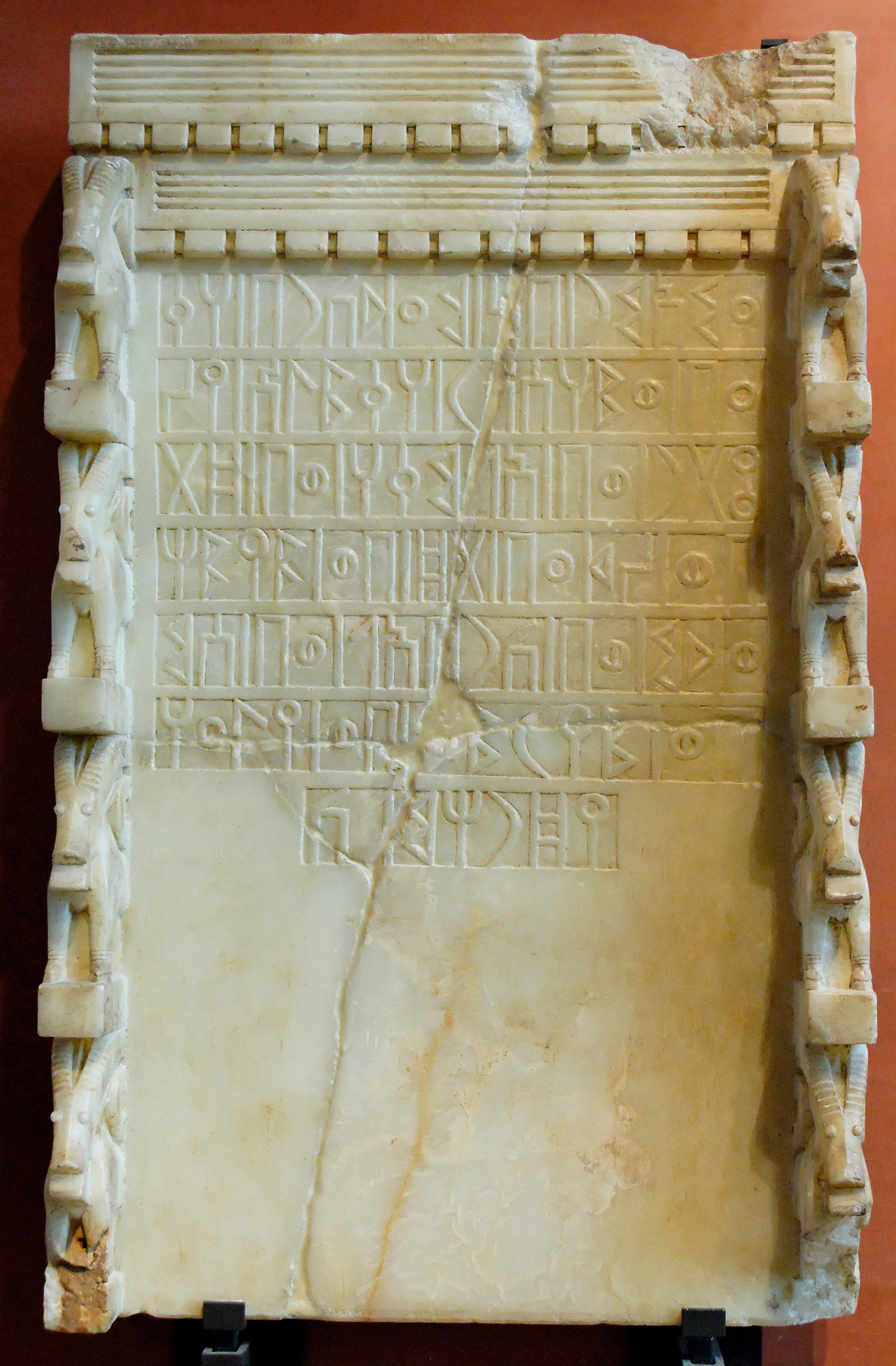
South Arabian inscription addressed to the Sabaean national god Almaqah

The Ancient South Arabian script (Old South Arabian: 𐩣𐩯𐩬𐩵, romanized: ms^{3}nd; modern Arabic: الْمُسْنَد musnad) branched from the Proto-Sinaitic script in about the late 2nd millennium BCE, and remained in use through the late sixth century CE. It is an abjad, a writing system where only consonants are obligatorily written, a trait shared with its predecessor, Proto-Sinaitic, as well as some of its sibling writing systems, including Arabic and Hebrew. It is a predecessor of the Ge'ez script, and a sibling script of the Phoenician alphabet and, through that, the modern Latin, Cyrillic, and Greek alphabets.

The script is really two variants: the monumental and the minuscule script, the former for inscriptions, the latter scratched with wooden sticks. The scripts have a common origin but evolved into separate systems.

== History ==
The earliest instances of the Ancient South Arabian (ASA) script are painted pottery sherds from Raybun in Hadhramaut in Yemen, which are dated to the late 2nd millennium BCE. It is an abjad script, meaning that only consonants are usually written in the script, with vowels inferred from context; it shares this feature both with its predecessor, the Proto-Sinaitic script, and modern Semitic languages. It is unclear precisely how and when the ASA script diverged from Proto-Sinaitic script, as inscriptions from its earliest days are rare. As with these other abjads, some vowels can be indicated if necessary, by matres lectionis.

Its mature form was reached around 800 BCE, and it remained in use in more or less the same form until the 6th century CE. In those centuries, it was used to write multiple languages of the Southern Arabian peninsula and the Horn of Africa, including Sabaic, Qatabanic, Hadramautic, Minaean, Hasaitic, and Geʽez. It was eventually displaced by the modern Arabic alphabet during the early years of the spread of Islam. The modern Arabic writing system is related to the ASA script, as both are children of the Proto-Sinaitic script, but modern Arabic derives from the Phoenician and Nabatean scripts rather than ASA.

The Geʽez script is the sole extant writing system that derives from ASA. Unlike ASA, Geʽez is an abugida; the primary characters are pairs of consonants and vowels, with each character representing a syllable. Geʽez has been used to write Amharic, Tigrinya and Tigre, as well as other languages (including various Semitic, Cushitic, Omotic, and Nilo-Saharan languages). ASA is also a sibling of the Phoenician – the ancestor of most of the modern European alphabets, such as Latin, Cyrillic and Greek.

== Properties ==
- It is usually written from right to left but can also be written from left to right. When written from left to right the characters are flipped horizontally (see the photo).
- The spacing or separation between words is done with a vertical bar mark (|).
- Letters in words are not connected together.
- It does not implement any diacritical marks (dots, etc.), differing in this respect from the modern Arabic alphabet.

=== Difference from the Arabic script ===
The Musnad script differs from the Arabic script, which most linguists believe developed from the Nabataean script in the fourth century AD, which in turn developed from the Aramaic script. The languages of the Southern Musnad script also differ greatly from the Northern Arabic language in terms of script, lexicon, grammar, styles, and perhaps sounds, and the letters of the script increase.

== Letters ==
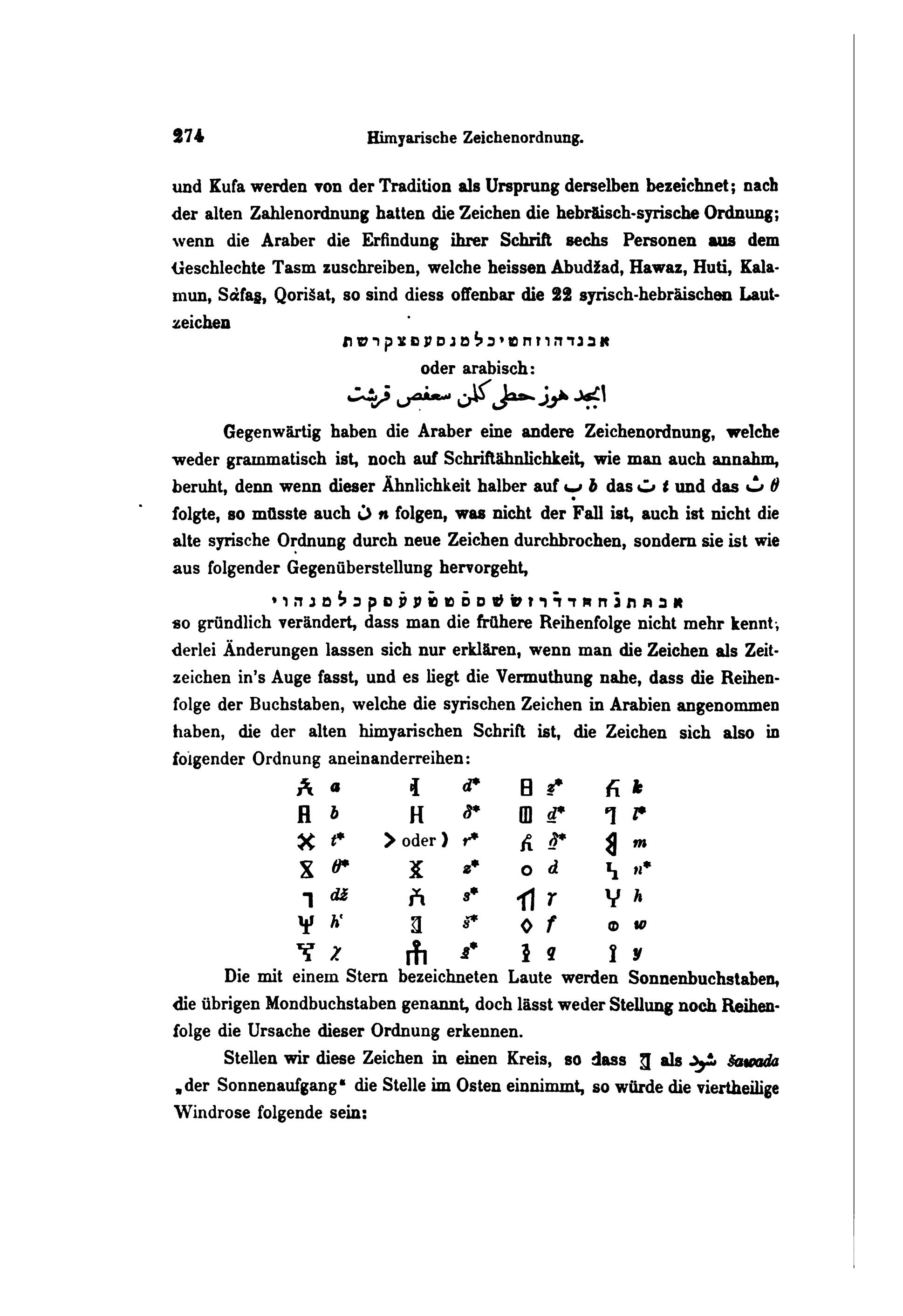
Sabaean letter examples on page 274 of the book "Illustrirte Geschichte der Schrift" by Carl Faulmann, 1880

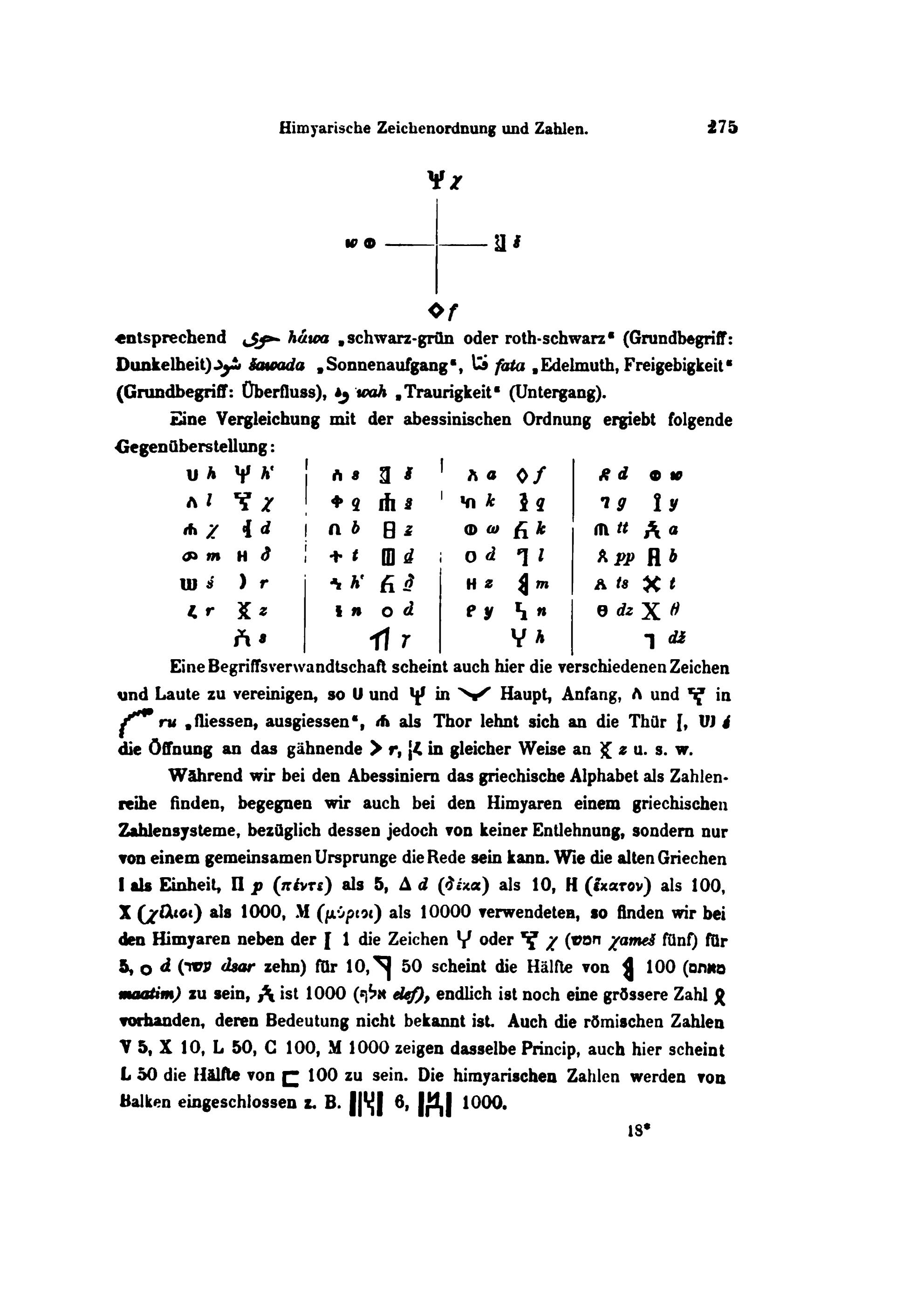
Sabaean letter examples on page 275 of the book "Illustrirte Geschichte der Schrift" by Carl Faulmann, 1880

Ancient South Arabian Letter	Phoneme	IPA	Corresponding letter in					
Ancient South Arabian Letter	Phoneme	IPA	Ancient North Arabian	Ge'ez	Phoenician	Aramaic	Arabic	Hebrew
𐩠	h	[h]	𐪀	ሀ	𐤄	𐡄	ه	ה
𐩡	l	[l]	𐪁	ለ	𐤋	𐡋	ل	ל
𐩢	ḥ	[ħ]	𐪂	ሐ	𐤇	𐡇	ح	ח
𐩭	ḫ	[x]	𐪍	ኀ	𐤇	𐡇	خ	ח
𐩣	m	[m]	𐪃	መ	𐤌	𐡌	م	מם
𐩤	q	[q]	𐪄	ቀ	𐤒	𐡒	ق	ק
𐩥	w	[w], [uː]	𐪅	ወ	𐤅	𐡅	و	ו
𐩧	r	[r]	𐪇	ረ	𐤓	𐡓	ر	ר
𐩨	b	[b]	𐪈	በ	𐤁	𐡁	ب	ב
𐩯	s³ (s)	[s̪]	𐪏	ሰ	𐤎	𐡎	س	ס
𐩪	s¹ (š)	[s]	𐪊	ሰ	𐤔	𐡔	س	שׁ
𐩻	ṯ	[θ]	𐪛	ሰ	𐤔	𐡔/𐡕	ث	שׁ
𐩦	s² (ś)	[ɬ]	𐪆	ሠ	𐤔	𐡔/𐡎	ش	שׂ
𐩩	t	[t]	𐪉	ተ	𐤕	𐡕	ت	ת
𐩫	k	[k]	𐪋	ከ	𐤊	𐡊	ك	כך
𐩬	n	[n]	𐪌	ነ	𐤍	𐡍	ن	נן
𐩰	f	[f]	𐪐	ፈ	𐤐	𐡐	ف	פף
𐩱	ʾ	[ʔ]	𐪑	አ	𐤀	𐡀	ا	א
𐩲	ʿ	[ʕ]	𐪒	ዐ	𐤏	𐡏	ع	ע
𐩶	ġ	[ɣ]	𐪖	ዐ	𐤏	𐡏	غ	ע
𐩮	ṣ	[sˤ]	𐪎	ጸ	𐤑	𐡑	ص	צץ
𐩼	ẓ	[θˤ]	𐪜	ጸ	𐤑	𐡑/𐡈	ظ	צץ
𐩳	ḍ	[ɬˤ]	𐪓	ፀ	𐤑	𐡒/𐡏	ض	צץ
𐩷	ṭ	[tˤ]	𐪗	ጠ	𐤈	𐡈	ط	ט
𐩴	g	[g]	𐪔	ገ	𐤂	𐡂	ج	ג
𐩸	z	[z]	𐪘	ዘ	𐤆	𐡆	ز	ז
𐩹	ḏ	[ð]	𐪙	ዘ	𐤆	𐡆/𐡃	ذ	ז
𐩵	d	[d]	𐪕	ደ	𐤃	𐡃	د	ד
𐩺	y	[j], [iː]	𐪚	የ	𐤉	𐡉	ي	י

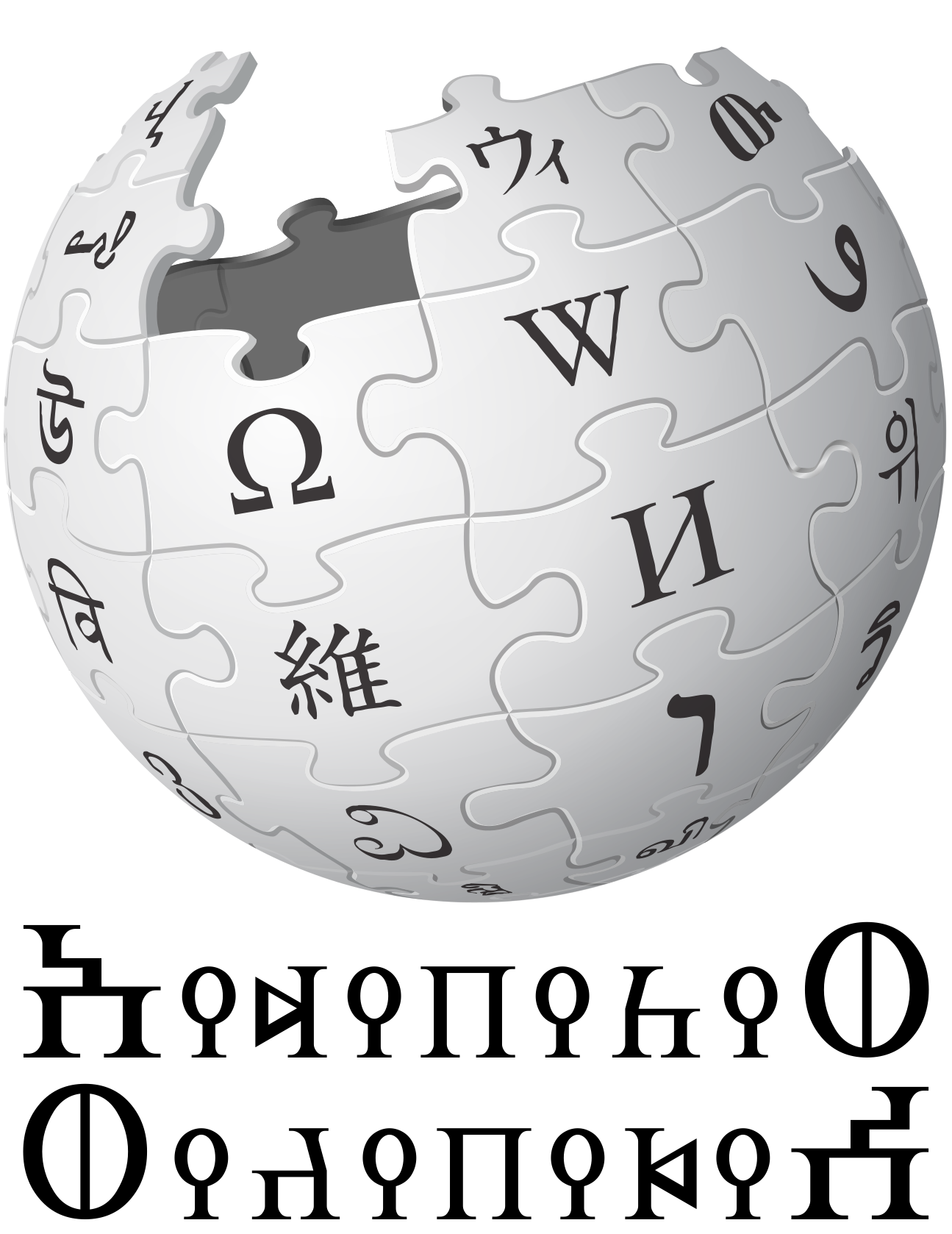
Wikipedia, written with musnad letters, from right to left on the upper line and from left to right on the bottom one. Notice how the letters are mirrored.

== Numerals ==
Six signs are used for numbers:

1	5	10	50	100	1000
𐩽	𐩭	𐩲	𐩾	𐩣	𐩱

The sign for 50 was evidently created by removing the lower triangle from the sign for 100. The sign for 1 doubles as a word separator. The other four signs double as both letters and numbers. Each of these four signs is the first letter of the name of the corresponding numeral.

An additional sign (𐩿) is used to bracket numbers, setting them apart from surrounding text. For example, 𐩿𐩭𐩽𐩽𐩿

These signs are used in an additive system similar to Roman numerals to represent any number (excluding zero). Two examples:

- 17 is written as 1 + 1 + 5 + 10: 𐩲𐩭𐩽𐩽
- 99 is written as 1 + 1 + 1 + 1 + 5 + 10 + 10 + 10 + 10 + 50: 𐩾𐩲𐩲𐩲𐩲𐩭𐩽𐩽𐩽𐩽

Sample numbers from one to twenty
1	2	3	4	5	6	7	8	9	10
𐩽	𐩽𐩽	𐩽𐩽𐩽	𐩽𐩽𐩽𐩽	𐩭	𐩭𐩽	𐩭𐩽𐩽	𐩭𐩽𐩽𐩽	𐩭𐩽𐩽𐩽𐩽	𐩲
11	12	13	14	15	16	17	18	19	20
𐩲𐩽	𐩲𐩽𐩽	𐩲𐩽𐩽𐩽	𐩲𐩽𐩽𐩽𐩽	𐩲𐩭	𐩲𐩭𐩽	𐩲𐩭𐩽𐩽	𐩲𐩭𐩽𐩽𐩽	𐩲𐩭𐩽𐩽𐩽𐩽	𐩲𐩲

Thousands are written two different ways:

- Smaller values are written using just the 1000 sign. For example, 8,000 is written as 1000 × 8: 𐩱𐩱𐩱𐩱𐩱𐩱𐩱𐩱
- Larger values are written by promoting the signs for 10, 50, and 100 to 10,000, 50,000, and 100,000 respectively:
  - 31,000 is written as 1000 + 10,000 × 3: 𐩲𐩲𐩲𐩱 (easily confused with 1,030)
  - 40,000 is written as 10,000 × 4: 𐩲𐩲𐩲𐩲 (easily confused with 40)
  - 253,000 is written as 2 × 100.000 + 50.000 + 3 × 1000: 𐩣𐩣𐩾𐩱𐩱𐩱 (easily confused with 3,250)

Perhaps because of ambiguity, numerals, at least in monumental inscriptions, are always clarified with the numbers written out in words.

== Zabūr ==
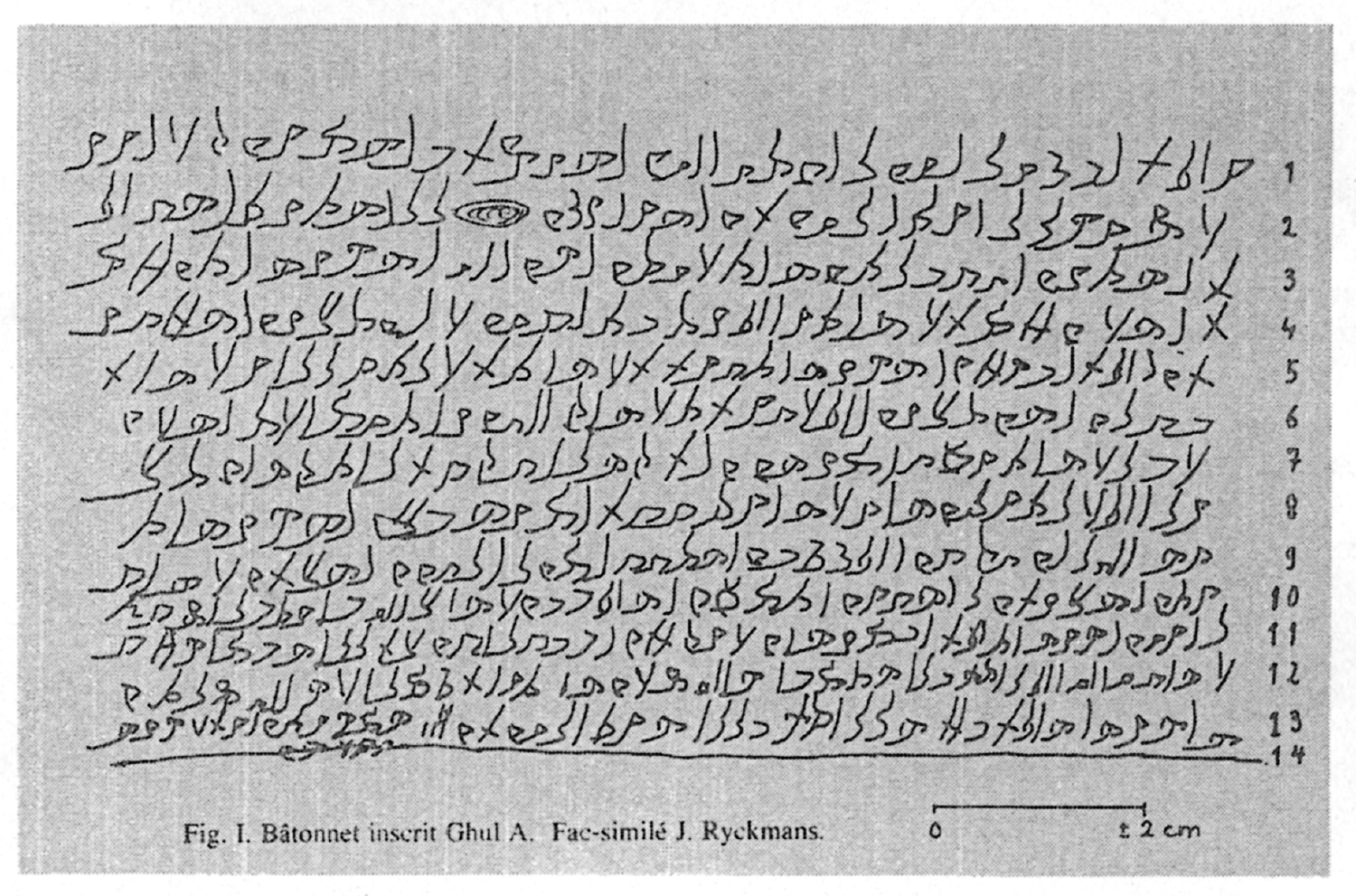
Zabur inscription

Zabūr, also known as "South Arabian minuscules", is the name of the cursive form of the South Arabian script that was used by the Sabaeans in addition to their monumental script, or Musnad.

Zabur was a writing system in ancient Yemen along with Musnad. The difference between the two is that Musnad documented historical events, whereas Zabur writings were used for religious scripts or to record daily transactions among ancient Yemenis. Zabur writings could be found in palimpsest form written on papyri or palm-leaf stalks.

== Unicode ==
The South Arabian alphabet was added to the Unicode Standard in October, 2009 with the release of version 5.2.

The Unicode block, called Old South Arabian, is U+10A60–U+10A7F.

Note that U+10A7D OLD SOUTH ARABIAN NUMBER ONE (𐩽) represents both the numeral one and a word divider.

Old South Arabian^{[1]} Official Unicode Consortium code chart (PDF)
	0	1	2	3	4	5	6	7	8	9	A	B	C	D	E	F
U+10A6x	𐩠	𐩡	𐩢	𐩣	𐩤	𐩥	𐩦	𐩧	𐩨	𐩩	𐩪	𐩫	𐩬	𐩭	𐩮	𐩯
U+10A7x	𐩰	𐩱	𐩲	𐩳	𐩴	𐩵	𐩶	𐩷	𐩸	𐩹	𐩺	𐩻	𐩼	𐩽	𐩾	𐩿
Notes 1.As of Unicode version 18.0

== In modern culture ==
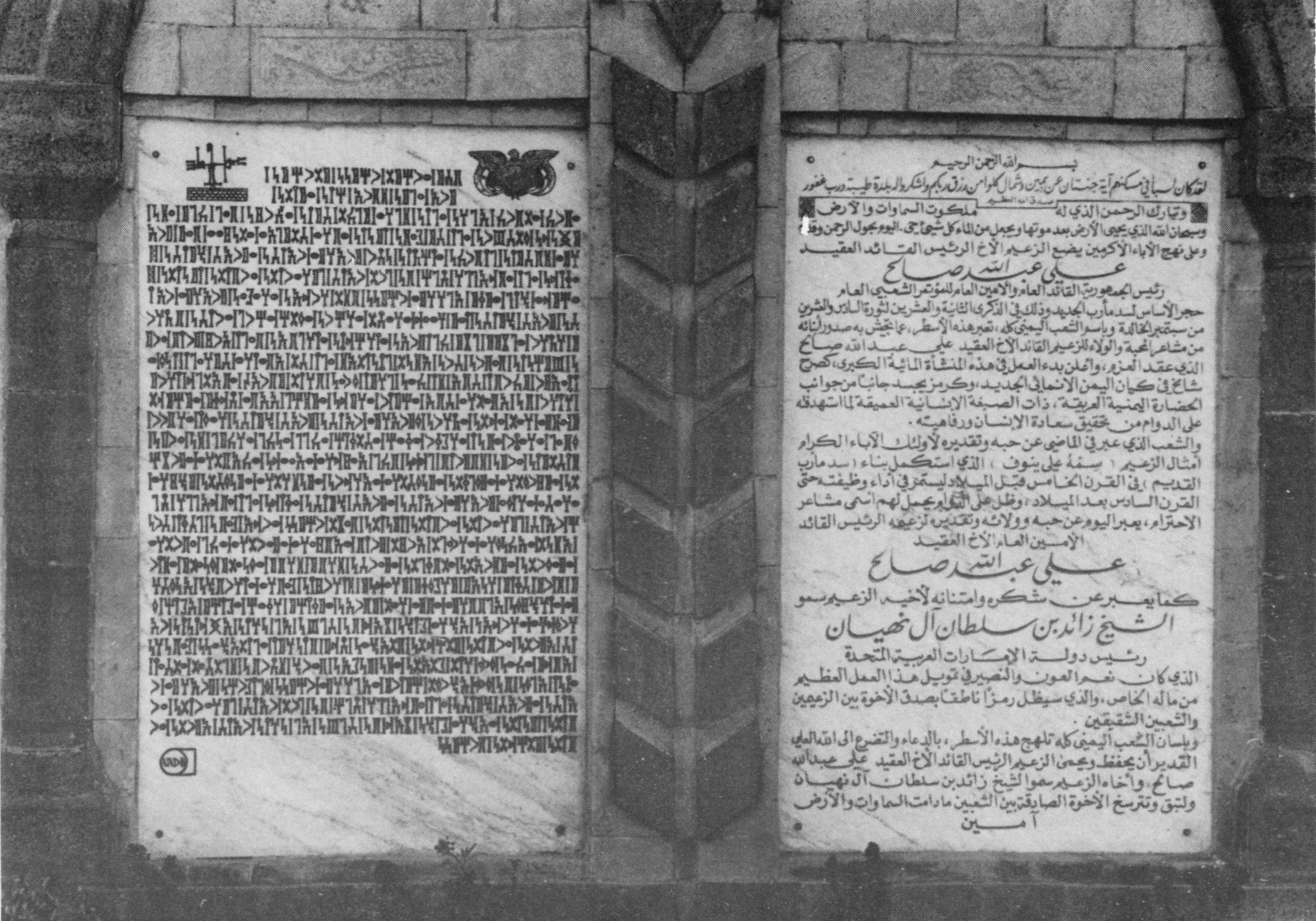
Ma’rib Dam inscription

Yemeni archeologist and linguist Mutaher al-Eryani was keen to record a memorial in the Musnad script and in the Sabaean language, commemorating the renovation of the Ma’rib Dam in 1986, which was carried out at the expense of Sheikh Zayed and in conjunction with the celebration of victory in the North Yemen Civil War against the Kingdom of Yemen. The inscription was published in a scientific article written by the Frenchman Christian Robin as the last official Musnad inscription.

== Gallery ==
- Photos from National Museum of Yemen:
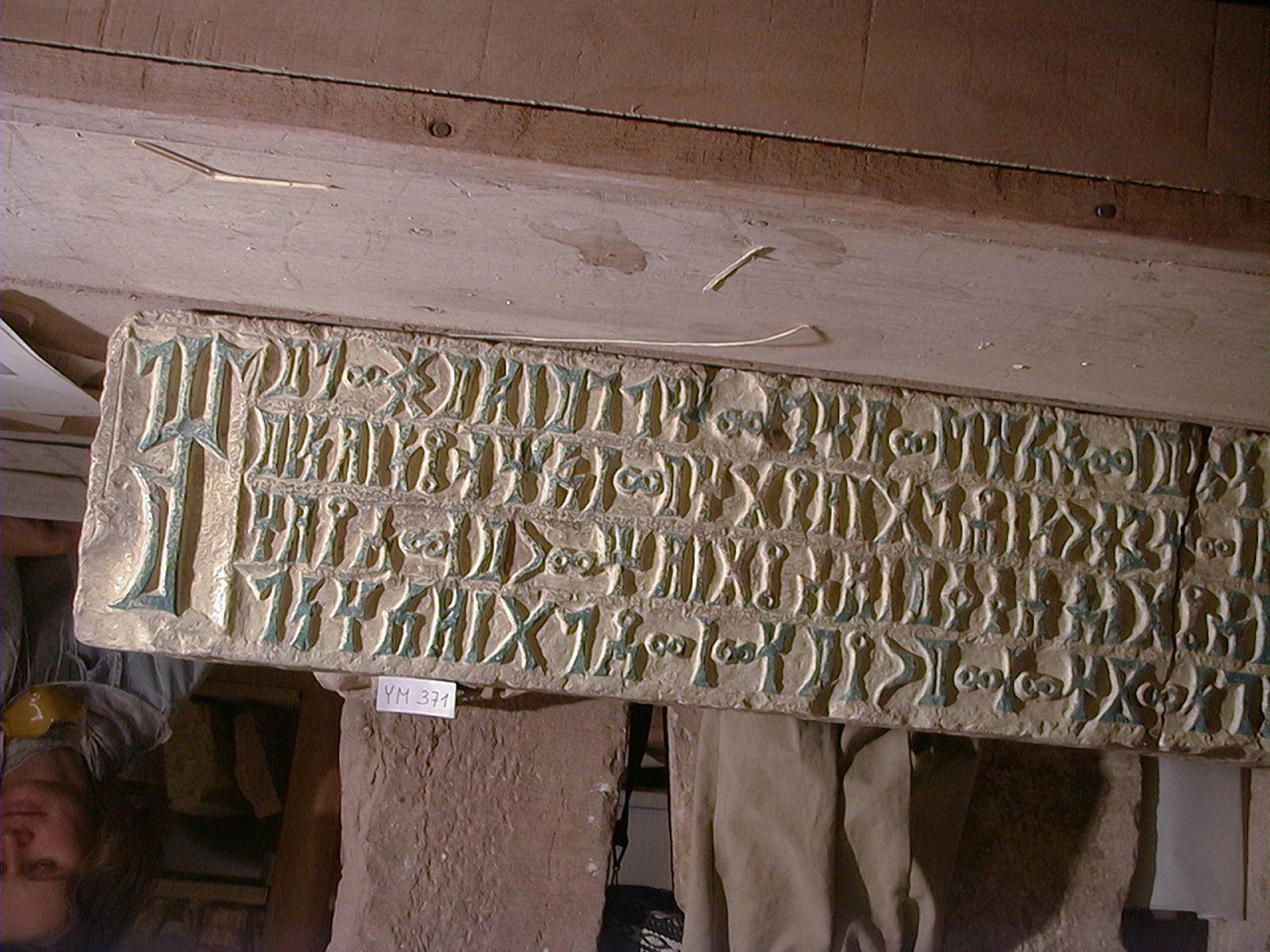

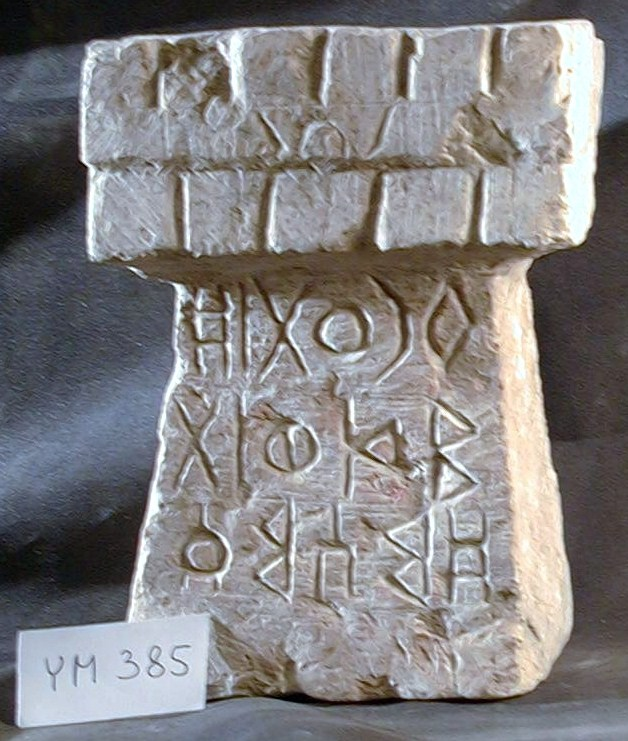

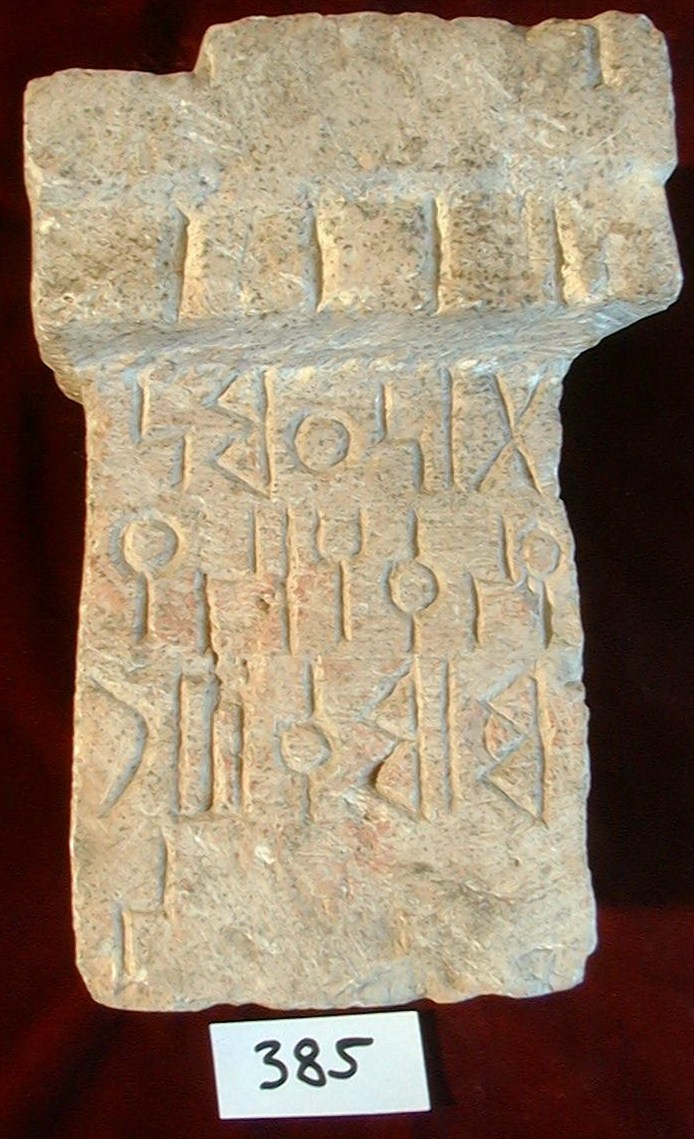

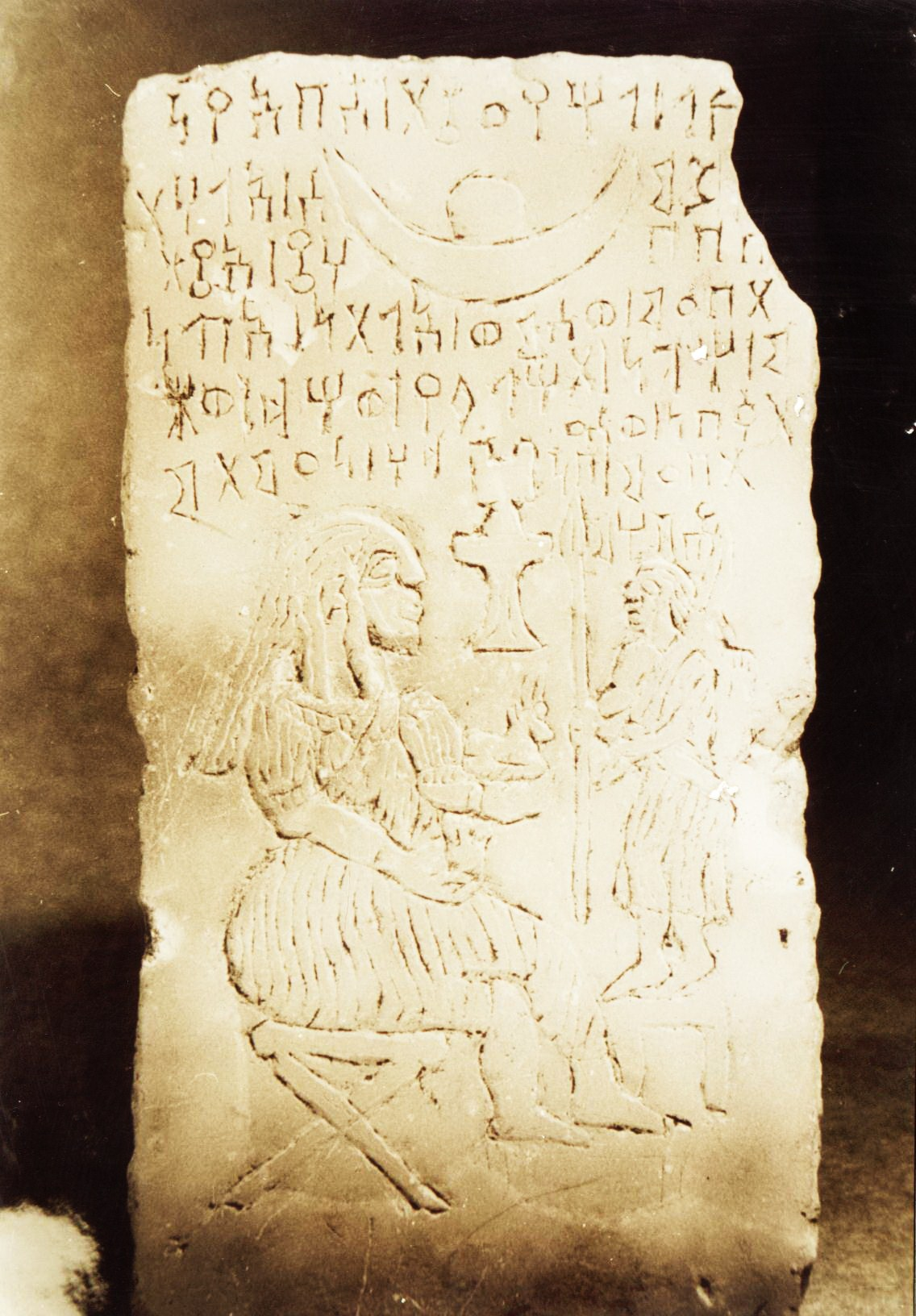

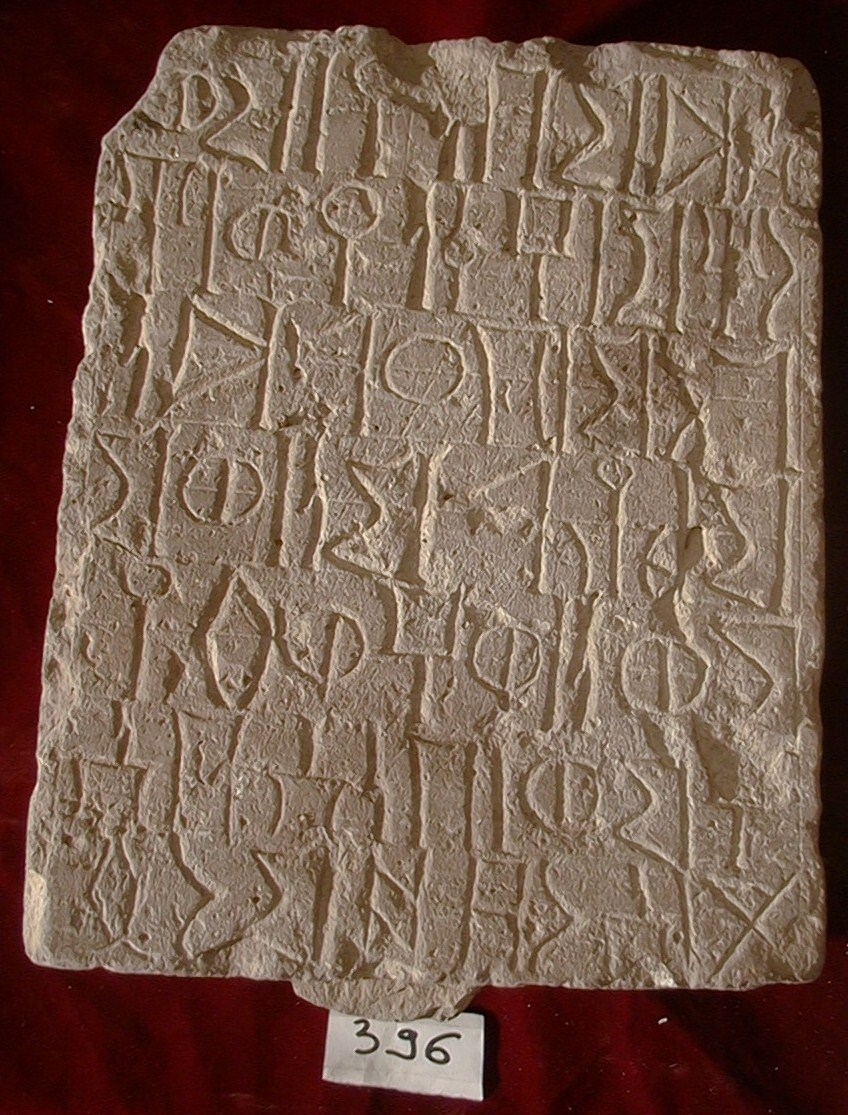

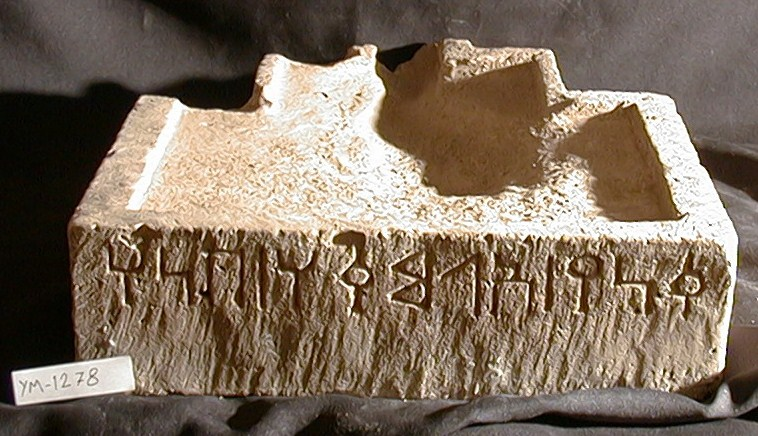

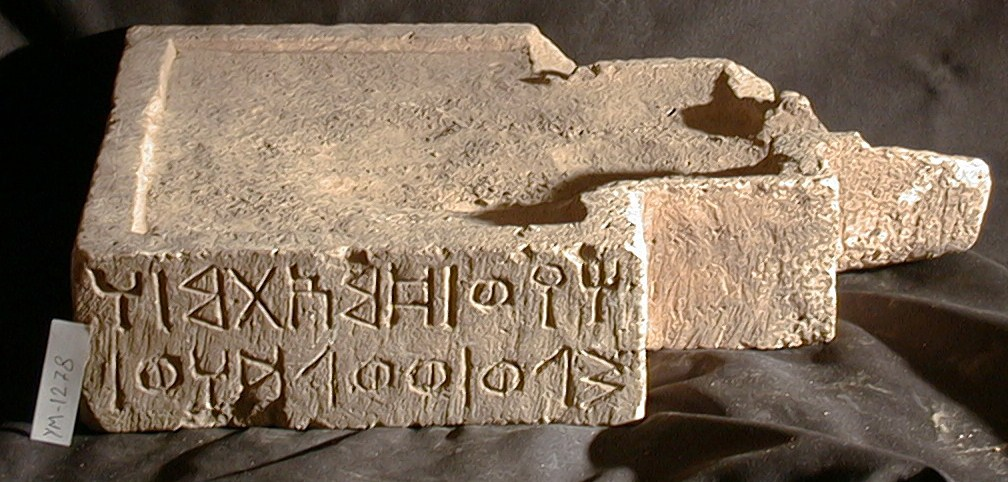

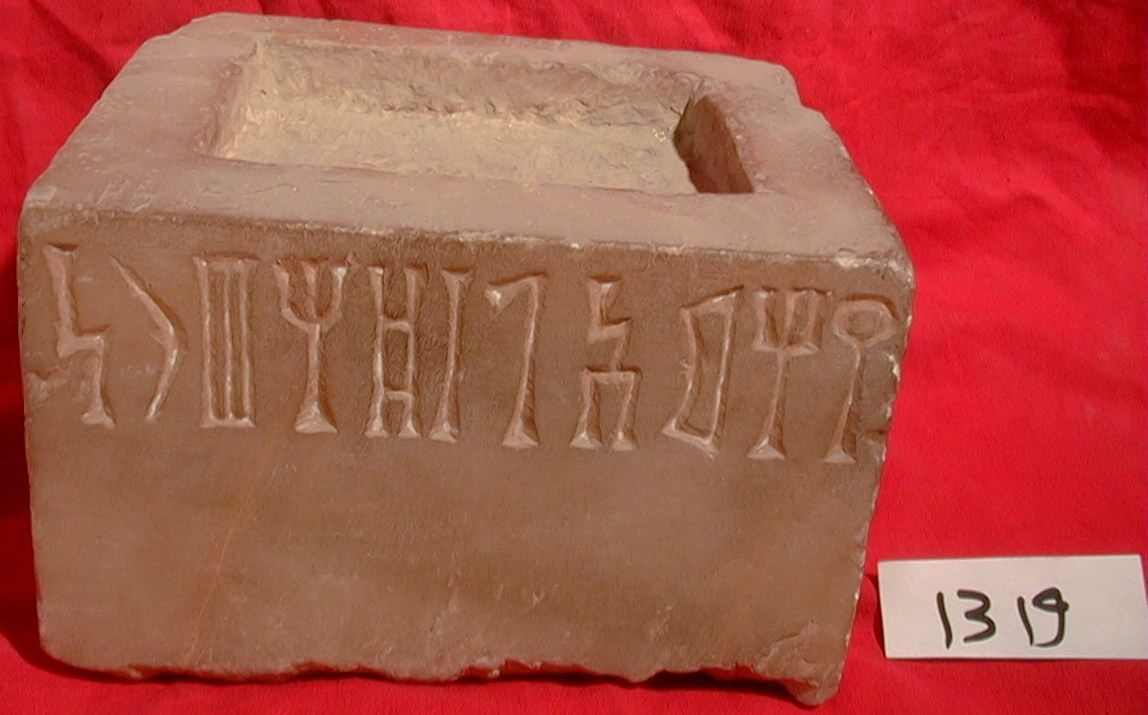

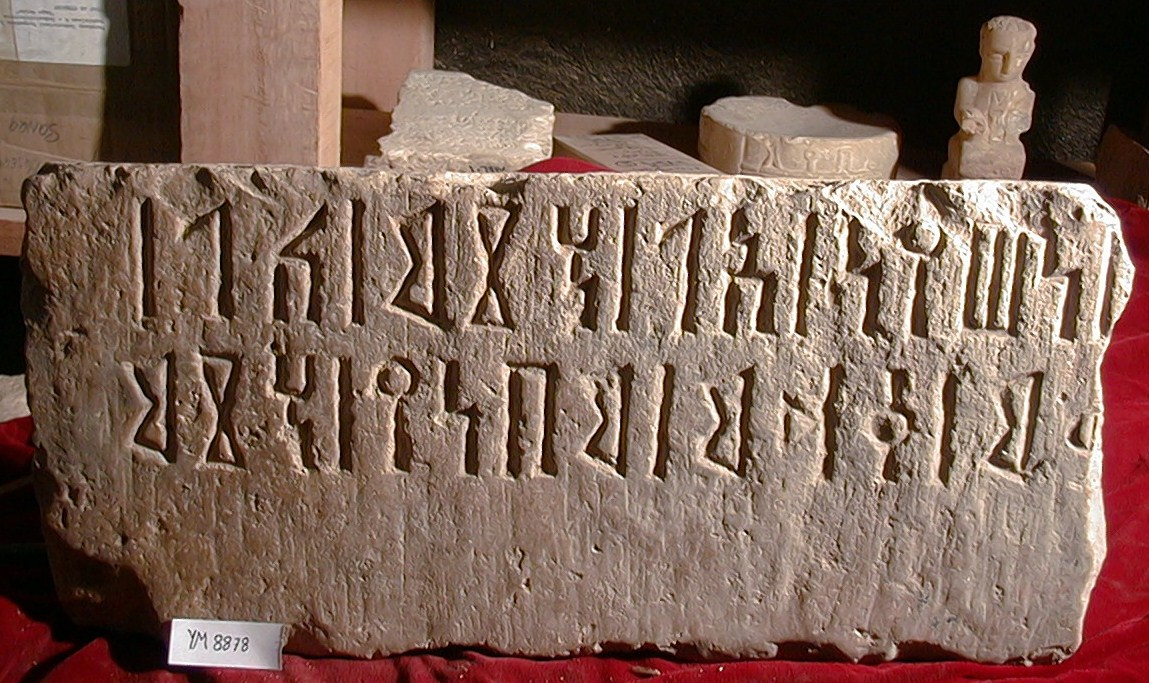

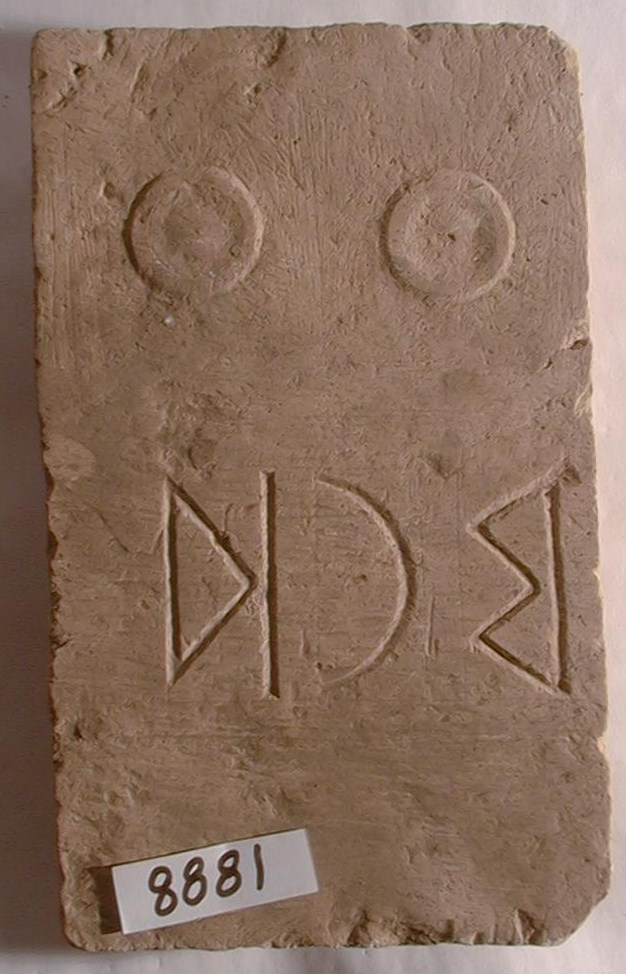

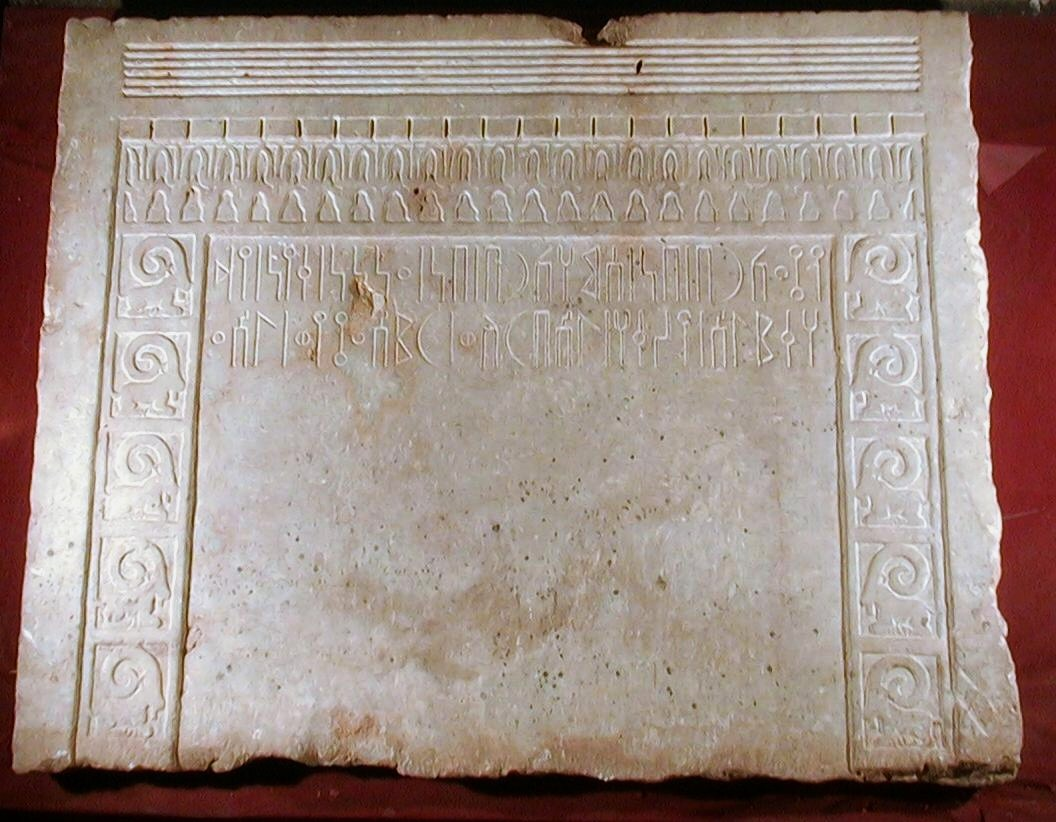
- Photos from Yemen Military Museum:
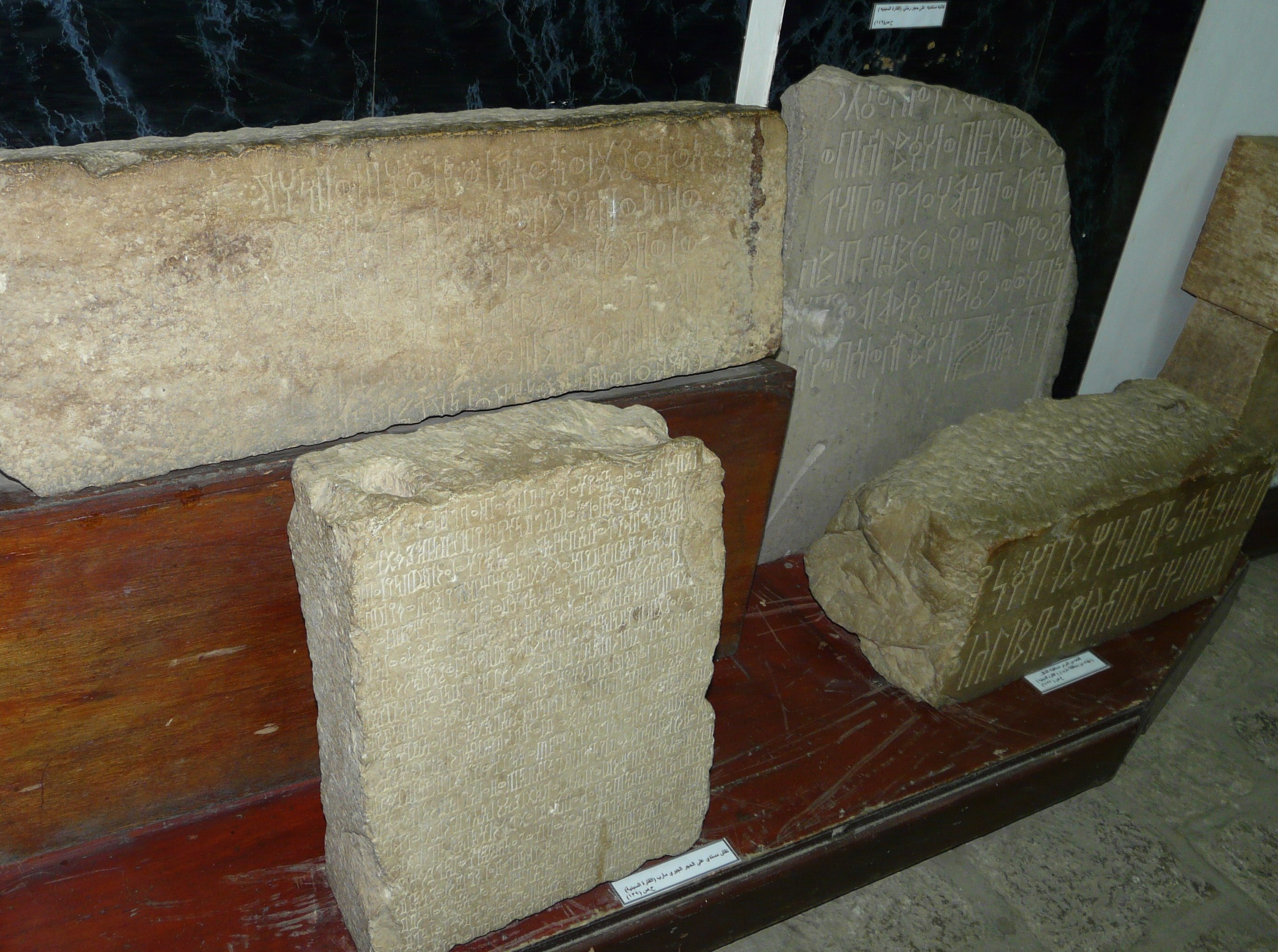
* Photos from the Mukalla Museum

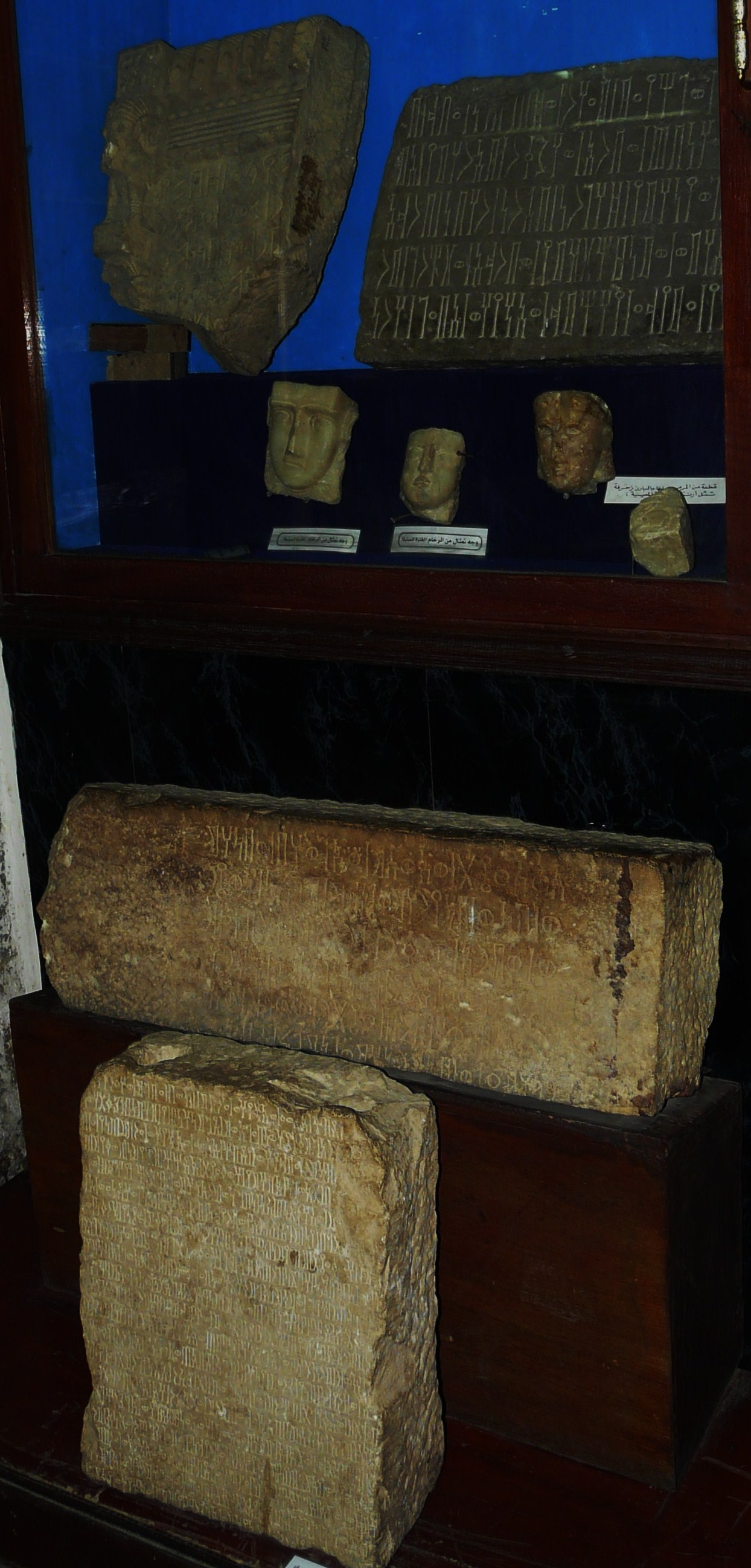

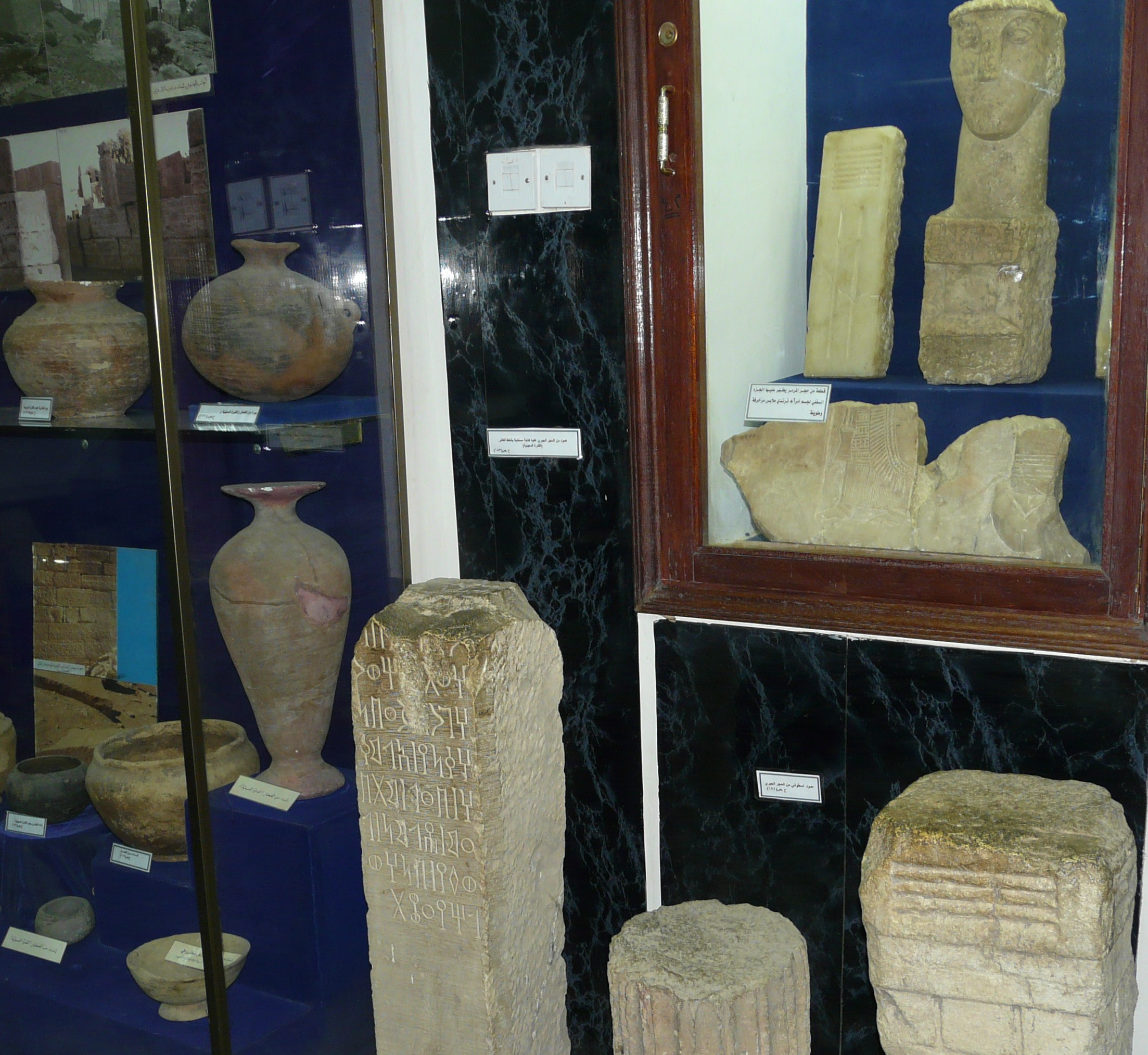
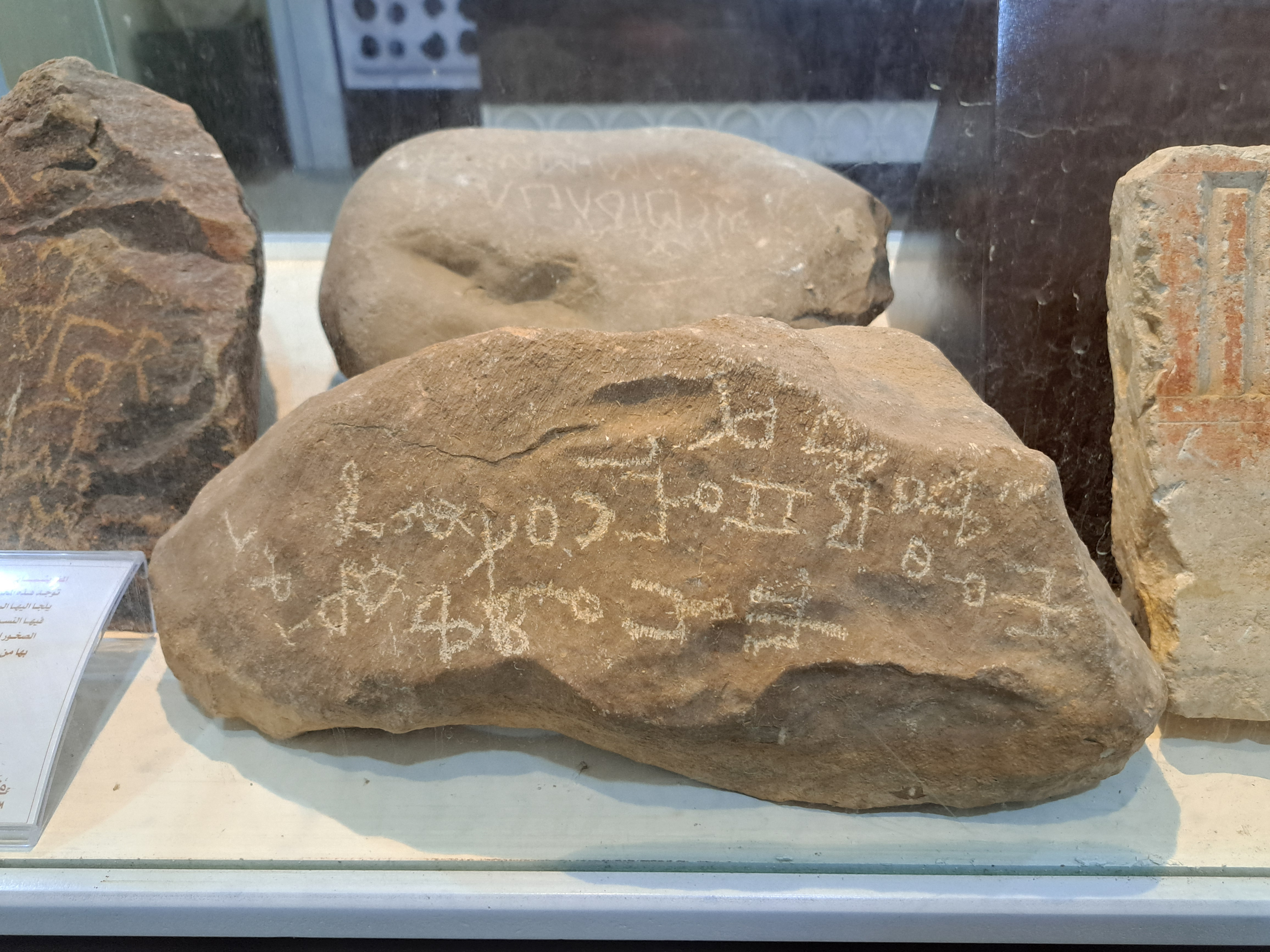

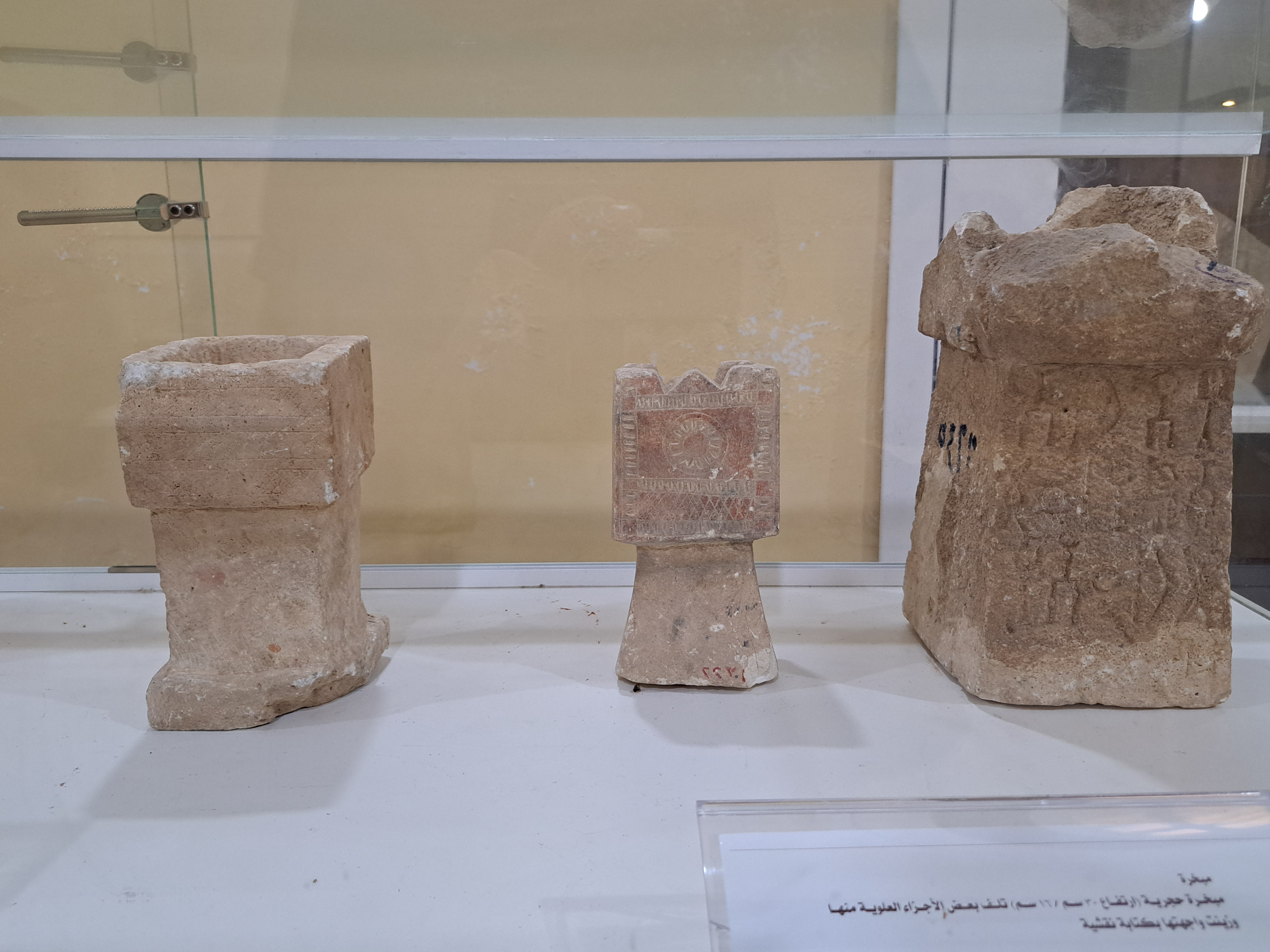

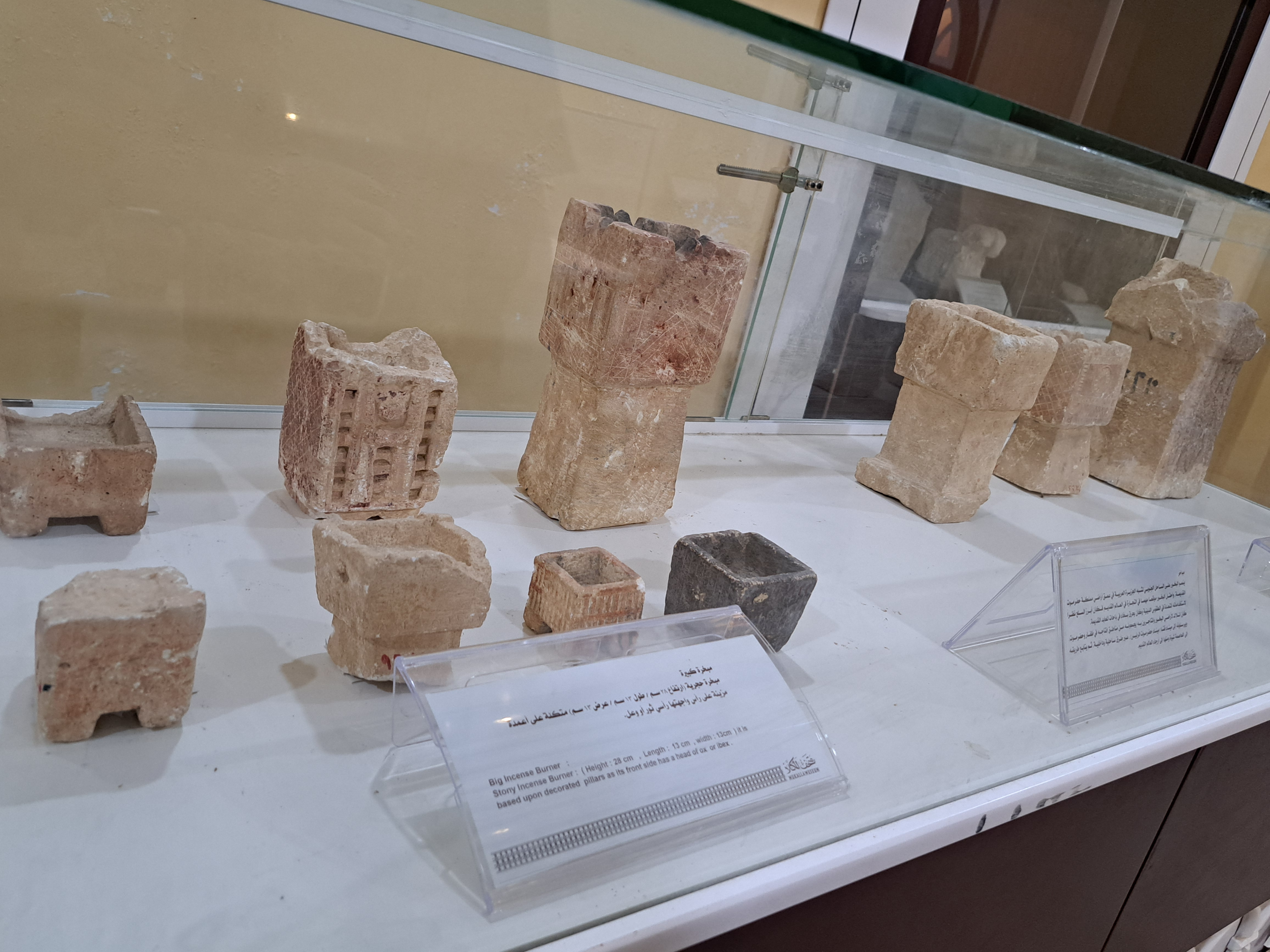
- Photo from the British Museum
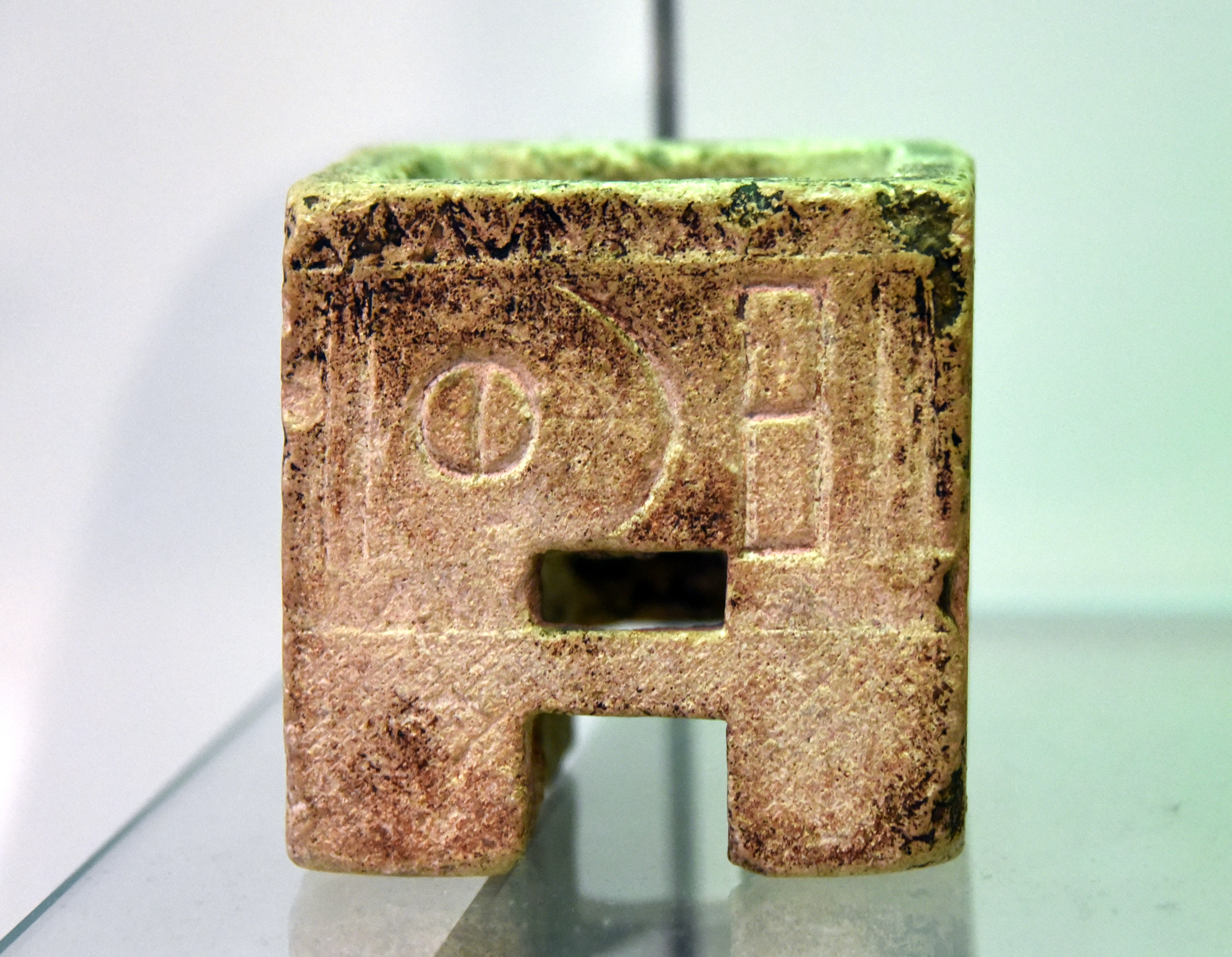
Incense burner, from Yemen, 5th-4th century BCE. An ancient South Arabian inscription about the names of incense

== See also ==
- Ancient North Arabian script
- Arabist and archeologist Eduard Glaser
- Geographer Carl Rathjens
- Paleo-Arabic
