= Sat (letter) =

While ፀ ሠ ጸ are the same sound while Sat is derived from Samekh

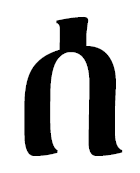
Sat (Ethiopian)

Śat (ሰ) is a letter of the Geʽez script. It is descended from South Arabian 𐩪. It represents both a historical "s" /s/ (a voiceless alveolar fricative), like the s in sink and "ṯ" /θ/ (a voiceless dental fricative), like the th in think.

It has the unicode designation U+1230 Ethiopic Syllable Sa.

== See also ==
- Ḍäppa ṣ́ ፀ
- Śawt ś ሠ
- Proto-Semitic
- Shin (letter)
- Samekh
