= Śawt =

Ethiopic letter

Śawt ሠ is a letter of the Geʽez script, descended from Epigraphic South Arabian, in Geʽez representing ś. It is reconstructed as descended from a Proto-Semitic voiceless lateral fricative *ś [ɬ], like the Welsh pronunciation of the ll in llwyd. It survived only in South Semitic as an independent phoneme.

Proto-Semitic	Modern South Arabian	Akkadian	Arabic		Phoenician		Hebrew		Aramaic		Geʽez	
ś /ɬ/	/ɬ/	š	ش	/ʃ/	š	/ʃ/	שׂ	/s/	שׂ	/s/	ሠ	/ɬ/

== See also ==
- Ḍäppa ṣ́ ፀ
- Proto-Semitic
- Sat (letter) s ሰ
- Shin (letter)
