= Old South Arabian (Unicode block) =

- Range: U+10A60..U+10A7F (32 code points)
- Plane: SMP
- Scripts: Old South Arabian
- Major alphabets: Minean; Sabaean; Qatabanian; Hadramite; Himyaritic
- Assigned: 32 code points
- Unused: 0 reserved code points

Unicode version history
- 5.2 (2009): 32 (+32)

Unicode documentation
- Code chart ∣ Web page

Old South Arabian is a Unicode block containing characters for writing the Minean, Sabaean, Qatabanian, Hadramite, and Himyaritic languages of Yemen from the 8th century BCE to the 6th century CE.

U+10A7D OLD SOUTH ARABIAN NUMBER ONE (𐩽) represents both the numeral one and a word divider.

Old South Arabian^{[1]} Official Unicode Consortium code chart (PDF)
	0	1	2	3	4	5	6	7	8	9	A	B	C	D	E	F
U+10A6x	𐩠	𐩡	𐩢	𐩣	𐩤	𐩥	𐩦	𐩧	𐩨	𐩩	𐩪	𐩫	𐩬	𐩭	𐩮	𐩯
U+10A7x	𐩰	𐩱	𐩲	𐩳	𐩴	𐩵	𐩶	𐩷	𐩸	𐩹	𐩺	𐩻	𐩼	𐩽	𐩾	𐩿
Notes: 1. As of Unicode version 16.0

== History ==
The following Unicode-related documents record the purpose and process of defining specific characters in the Old South Arabian block:

Version	Final code points (Note: Proposed code points and characters names may differ from final code points and names)	Count	L2 ID	WG2 ID	Document
5.2	U+10A60..10A7F	32	L2/98-036	N1689	Everson, Michael (1998-01-18), Proposal to encode South Arabian in Plane 1 of ISO/IEC 10646
5.2	U+10A60..10A7F	32	L2/98-286	N1703	Umamaheswaran, V. S.; Ksar, Mike (1998-07-02), "8.19", Unconfirmed Meeting Minutes, WG 2 Meeting #34, Redmond, WA, USA; 1998-03-16--20
5.2	U+10A60..10A7F	32	L2/99-224	N2097, N2025-2	Röllig, W. (1999-07-23), Comments on proposals for the Universal Multiple-Octed Coded Character Set
5.2	U+10A60..10A7F	32		N2133	Response to comments on the question of encoding Old Semitic scripts in the UCS (N2097), 1999-10-04
5.2	U+10A60..10A7F	32	L2/00-010	N2103	Umamaheswaran, V. S. (2000-01-05), "10.4", Minutes of WG 2 meeting 37, Copenhagen, Denmark: 1999-09-13—16
5.2	U+10A60..10A7F	32		N3353 (pdf, doc)	Umamaheswaran, V. S. (2007-10-10), "M51.27", Unconfirmed minutes of WG 2 meeting 51 Hanzhou, China; 2007-04-24/27
5.2	U+10A60..10A7F	32	L2/07-240	N3309	Maktari, Sultan; Mansour, Kamal (2007-07-30), Proposal to encode South Arabian Script
5.2	U+10A60..10A7F	32	L2/07-287	N3296	Everson, Michael (2007-08-29), Towards a proposal to encode the Old South Arabian script in the SMP of the UCS
5.2	U+10A60..10A7F	32	L2/08-044	N3395	Maktari, Sultan; Mansour, Kamal (2008-01-28), Proposal to encode Old South Arabian Script
5.2	U+10A60..10A7F	32	L2/08-003		Moore, Lisa (2008-02-14), "Old South Arabian", UTC #114 Minutes
5.2	U+10A60..10A7F	32	L2/08-318	N3453 (pdf, doc)	Umamaheswaran, V. S. (2008-08-13), "M52.16", Unconfirmed minutes of WG 2 meeting 52
5.2	U+10A60..10A7F	32	L2/08-348	N3517	Anderson, Deborah (2008-09-30), Comments on Old South Arabian Names in N4034
5.2	U+10A60..10A7F	32	L2/08-161R2		Moore, Lisa (2008-11-05), "Consensus 115-C19", UTC #115 Minutes, "Update the approved Old South Arabian block range to U+10A60..U+10A7F, with all code points revised accordingly."
5.2	U+10A60..10A7F	32	L2/08-412	N3553 (pdf, doc)	Umamaheswaran, V. S. (2008-11-05), "M53.05", Unconfirmed minutes of WG 2 meeting 53
5.2	U+10A60..10A7F	32	L2/08-361		Moore, Lisa (2008-12-02), "Consensus 117-C18", UTC #117 Minutes
5.2	U+10A60..10A7F	32	L2/09-234	N3603 (pdf, doc)	Umamaheswaran, V. S. (2009-07-08), "M54.03a", Unconfirmed minutes of WG 2 meeting 54
5.2	U+10A60..10A7F	32	L2/09-104		Moore, Lisa (2009-05-20), "Consensus 119-C19", UTC #119 / L2 #216 Minutes, "Approve the name changes in section A, B, and C of document L2/09-177... [U+10A6A, U+10A6F]"
