= Ḍād =

Letter of the Arabic alphabet

← Ḏāl Ḍād Ẓāʾ →
- Arabic: ﺽ
- Geʽez: ፀ
- Phonemic representation: dˤ (Note: Most of Egypt, Sudan, Syria, and the Levant except Jordan.), (ðˤ) (Note: Most of the Arabian Peninsula, Iraq, and Tunisia.), ɮˤ (Note: Classical Arabic and some Tihamah dialects.)
- Position in alphabet: 26
- Numerical value: 800

Alphabetic derivatives of the Phoenician

Ḍād ضاد
- ﺽ

Usage
- Writing system: Arabic script
- Type: Abjad
- Language of origin: Arabic language
- Sound values: dˤ (standard); ðˤ (dialectal); ɮˤ (classical)
- Alphabetical position: 15

History
- Development: 𐤑; 𐡑; 𐢙; ص; ض

Other
- Writing direction: Right-to-left

Ḍād (ﺽ) is the fifteenth letter of the Arabic alphabet, one of the six letters not in the twenty-two akin to the Phoenician alphabet (the others being ṯāʾ, ḫāʾ, ḏāl, ẓāʾ, ġayn). In name and shape, it is a variant of ṣād. Its numerical value is 800 (see Abjad numerals). It is related to the Ancient North Arabian 𐪓, South Arabian 𐩳.

The letter symbol itself is a derivation, by addition of a diacritic dot, from ص ṣād (representing /sˤ/).

Position in word:	Isolated	Final	Medial	Initial
Glyph form: (Help)	ض	ـض	ـضـ	ضـ

== Origin ==
Based on ancient descriptions of this sound, it is clear that in Qur'anic as well as in the Classical Arabic ḍ was some sort of unusual lateral sound. Sibawayh, author of the first book on Arabic grammar, explained the letter as being articulated from "between the first part of the side of the tongue and the adjoining molars". It is reconstructed by modern linguists as having been either a pharyngealized voiced alveolar lateral fricative [ɮˤ] or a similar affricated sound [d͡ɮˤ] or [dˡˤ]. The affricated form is suggested by loans of ḍ into Akkadian as ld or lṭ. However, not all linguists agree on this; the French orientalist André Roman supposes that the letter was actually a voiced emphatic alveolo-palatal sibilant /ʑˤ/, similar to the Polish ź. The reconstruction of Proto-Semitic phonology includes an emphatic alveolar lateral ejective fricative [ɬʼ] or affricate [t͡ɬʼ] for ṣ́. This sound is considered to be the direct ancestor of Arabic ḍād, while merging with ṣād in most other Semitic languages.

The emphatic lateral nature of this sound is possibly inherited from Proto-Semitic, and is compared to a phoneme in Modern South Arabian languages such as Soqotri, but also in Mehri where it is usually an ejective lateral fricative. In Ḥarsusi the counterpart to ض is mostly pronounced as lateral /ɬˤ/ (and its allophone [ɮˤ]), for example Harsusi /jeɬˤ.ħoːk/ vs. Arabic يضحك /jadˤ.ħak/ "he laughs", and Harsusi /ʔaː.reɬˤ/ vs. Arabic عريض /ʕa.riːdˤ/ "wide" but it also sometimes corresponds to Arabic ظ as in Harsusi /ɬˤa.her/ vs. Arabic ظهر /ðˤahr/ "back". In Shehri (Jibbali) it also corresponds to Arabic ض [mi.rəɬˤ] vs. مرض /ma.ri.dˤa/ "he fell ill", [ʕiɬˤed] vs. عضد /ʕa.dˤud/ "(upper) arm" and [ɛrɬˤ] vs. أرض /ʔardˤ/ "land", but also corresponds to Arabic ظ as in [ɛɬˤ.her] vs. Arabic اظهر /aðˤ.hir/ "show, reveal".

This is an extremely unusual sound, and led the early Arabic grammarians to describe Arabic as the لغة الضاد lughat aḍ-ḍād "the language of the ḍād", since the sound was thought to be unique to Arabic. Other Arabic grammarians like al-Dani described the letter ẓāʾ ظ as "being unique to Arabs among other nations".

The corresponding letter in the Ancient South Arabian alphabet is ṣ́, and in the Geʽez script Ṣ́appa ፀ), although in Geʽez it merged early on with ṣ Sappa.

Emphatic consonants
Proto-Semitic		Old South Arabian	Old North Arabian	Modern South Arabian ^{1}	Standard Arabic		Aramaic		Modern Hebrew		Ge'ez		Phoenician		Akkadian
ṣ	[sʼ] / [tsʼ]	𐩮	𐪎	/sʼ/, rarely /ʃʼ/	ص	/sˤ/	צ	ṣ	צ	/t͡s/	ጸ	ṣ	𐤑	ṣ	ṣ
ṯ̣	[θʼ]	𐩼	𐪜	/θʼ ~ ðˤ/	ظ	/ðˤ/	צ, later ט	*ṱ, ṣ, later ṭ	צ	/t͡s/	ጸ	ṣ	𐤑	ṣ	ṣ
ṣ́	[ɬʼ] / [tɬʼ]	𐩳	𐪓	/ɬʼ/	ض	/dˤ/	ק, later ע	*ṣ́, q/ḳ, later ʿ	צ	/t͡s/	ፀ	ṣ́	𐤑	ṣ	ṣ
Notes: 1. ṯ [θ], ḏ [ð] and ṯ̣ [θʼ] merge with [t], [d], and [tʼ] in Soqotri

== Pronunciation ==
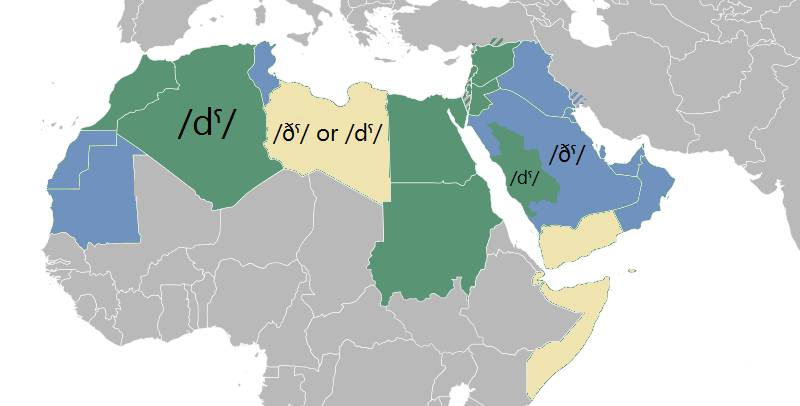
The main pronunciations of written ⟨ض⟩ in Arabic dialects.

The standard pronunciation of this letter in Modern Standard Arabic is the "emphatic" /dˤ/: pharyngealized voiced alveolar stop [dˤ], pharyngealized voiced dental stop [d̪ˤ] or velarized voiced dental stop [d̪ˠ].

In most Arabic vernaculars ض ḍād and ظ ẓāʾ merged quite early; in the varieties where the dental fricatives are preserved such as Najdi, Tunisian and Mesopotamian Arabic dialects, both the letters are pronounced /ðˤ/. However, there are dialects in South Arabia and in Mauritania and the Sahrawi where both the letters are kept different but not in all contexts. In other vernaculars such as Egyptian ض ḍād and ظ ẓāʾ contrast; but Classical Arabic ẓāʾ becomes /zˤ/, e.g. ʿaẓīm [ʕɑˈzˤiːm] (< Classical عظيم ʿaḏ̣īm [ʕæˈðˤiːm]) "great".

One of the important aspects in some Tihama dialects is the preservation of the emphatic lateral fricative sound [ɮˤ], this sound is likely to be very similar to the original realization of ḍād, but this sound ([ɬˤ~ ɮˤ]) and [ðˤ] are used as two allophones for the two letters ḍād ض and ẓāʾ ظ. A study regarding the Rijal Almaa language in southern Saudi Arabia has shown that the de-lateralization is apparent for the majority of speakers and more apparent among the younger speakers, and [ðˤ] is the most prevalent pronunciation for both ḍād ض and ẓāʾ ظ.

"De-emphaticized" pronunciation of both letters in the form of the plain /z/ entered into other non-Semitic languages such as Persian, Urdu, Punjabi, and Turkish. However, there do exist Arabic borrowings into Ibero-Romance languages as well as Hausa and Malay, where ḍād and ẓāʾ are differentiated.

Languages / Countries	Pronunciation of the letters	
Languages / Countries	ض	ظ
Modern South Arabian languages (Mehri, Shehri, Harsusi)	/ɬʼ/	/θʼ ~ ðʼ/
Standard Arabic (full distinction)	/dˤ/	/ðˤ/
Most of the Arabian Peninsula, Iraq, and Tunisia. Partial in: Libya, Jordan, Syria, and Palestine	/ðˤ/	
Most of Algeria, and Morocco. Partial in: Libya, Tunisia and Yemen	/dˤ/	
Most of Egypt, Sudan, Syria, Lebanon, and Palestine. Partial in: Jordan, and Saudi Arabia	/dˤ/	/dˤ/, /zˤ/ (Note: In Mauritania (Hassaniya Arabic), ض is mostly pronounced /ðˤ/ as in /ðˤħak/ ('to laugh'), from */dˤaħika/ ضحك, but /dˤ/ generally appears in the lexemes borrowed from Standard Arabic as in /dˤʕiːf/ ('weak'), from */dˤaʕiːf/ ضعيف.; In Egypt, Lebanon, etc, ظ is mostly pronounced /dˤ/ in inherited words as in /dˤalma/ ('darkness'), from */ðˤulma/ ظلمة; /ʕadˤm/ ('bone'), from /ʕaðˤm/ عظم, but pronounced /zˤ/ in borrowings from Literary Arabic as in /zˤulm/ ('injustice'); from */ðˤulm/ ظلم.; In some accents in Egypt, the emphatic /dˤ/ is pronounced as a plain /d/.)
Mauritania, Partial in: Morocco	/ðˤ/, /dˤ/	/ðˤ/

=== Pronunciation across other languages ===
Pronunciation of ⟨ض⟩ in other languages
Language	Alphabet name	Pronunciation (IPA)
Malay	Jawi	/d/ (Note: in Pegon and Jawi scripts ض ḍād is /d/ while ظ ẓāʾ is /z/, and in Hausa ض ḍād is /l/ while ظ ẓāʾ is /z/, but in other languages they merge)
Javanese	Pegon	/d/
Swahili	Ajami	/ð/
Hausa	Ajami	/l/
Azeri	Arabic script	/z/
Brahui	Arabic script	/z/
Hindko		/z/
Kashmiri	Arabic script	/z/
Ottoman Turkish	Arabic script	/z/
Pashto		/z/
Persian		/z/
Punjabi	Shahmukhi	/z/
Saraiki	Shahmukhi	/z/
Sindhi	Arabic script	/z/
Urdu		/z/
Uzbek	Arabic script	/z/

== Transliteration ==
ض is transliterated as ḍ (d with underdot) in romanization. The combination ⟨dh⟩ is also sometimes used colloquially. In varieties where the Ḍād has merged with the Ẓāʾ, the symbol for the latter might be used for both (eg. ⟨ظل⟩ 'to stay' and ⟨ضل⟩ 'to be lost' may both be transcribed as ḏ̣al in Gulf Arabic).

When transliterating Arabic in the Hebrew alphabet, it is either written as ד (the letter for /d/) or as צ׳ (tsadi with geresh), which is also used to represent the /tʃ/ sound. The Arabic letters ṣād ص and ḍād ض share the same Semitic origin with the Hebrew tsade.

In Judeo-Arabic orthography, it has been written as צׄ/ץׄ (tsade with holam), emulating Arabic orthography, where the letter is created by adding a dot to ṣād ص.

== Unicode ==
Character information
Preview	ض	
Unicode name	ARABIC LETTER DAD	
Encodings	decimal	hex
Unicode	1590	U+0636
UTF-8	216 182	D8 B6
Numeric character reference	&#1590;	&#x636;

== See also ==
- Arabic phonology
- Sat
- Śawt
- Ḍ
