= Ẓāʾ =

Letter of the Arabic alphabet

← Ḍād Ẓāʾ Ghayn →
- Arabic: ظ
- Phonemic representation: ðˤ~zˤ, (dˤ)
- Position in alphabet: 27
- Numerical value: 900

Alphabetic derivatives of the Phoenician

Ẓāʾ ظاء /ðˤɑːʔ/
- ظ

Usage
- Writing system: Arabic script
- Type: Abjad
- Language of origin: Arabic language
- Sound values: ðˤ, zˤ (standard); dˤ (dialectal)
- Alphabetical position: 17

History
- Development: 𐤈; 𐡈; 𐢋; ط

Other
- Writing direction: Right-to-left

Ẓāʾ, or ḏ̣āʾ (ظ), is the seventeenth letter of the Arabic alphabet, one of the six letters not in the twenty-two akin to the Phoenician alphabet (the others being ṯāʾ, ḫāʾ, ḏāl, ḍād, ġayn) collectively called al-Rawādif (Arabic: الروادف). In name and shape, it is a variant of ṭāʾ. Its numerical value is 900 (see Abjad numerals). It is related to the Ancient North Arabian 𐪜, and South Arabian 𐩼.

Ẓāʾ ظاء does not change its shape depending on its position in the word:

Position in word:	Isolated	Final	Medial	Initial
Glyph form: (Help)	ظ	ـظ	ـظـ	ظـ

== Frequency ==
Ẓāʾ is the rarest phoneme of the Arabic language. Out of 2,967 triliteral roots listed by Hans Wehr in his 1952 dictionary, only 42 (1.4%) contain ظ. Ẓāʾ is the least mentioned letter in the Quran, only being mentioned 853 times in the Quran.

In relation to other Semitic languages

In some reconstructions of Proto-Semitic phonology, there is an emphatic interdental fricative, ṯ̣/ḏ̣ ([θˤ] or [ðˤ]), featuring as the direct ancestor of Arabic ẓāʾ, while it merged with ṣ in most other Semitic languages, although the South Arabian alphabet retained a symbol for ẓ.

== Pronunciation ==
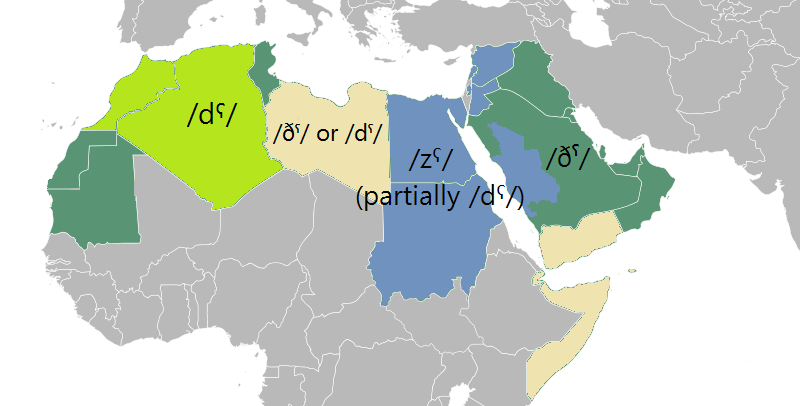
The main pronunciations of written ⟨ظ⟩ in Arabic dialects.

In Classical Arabic, it represents a velarized voiced dental fricative [ðˠ], and in Modern Standard Arabic, it represents an pharyngealized voiced dental [ðˤ] but can also be a alveolar [zˤ] fricative for some speakers.

In most Arabic vernaculars ظ ẓāʾ and ض ḍād merged quite early. The outcome depends on the dialect. In those varieties (such as Egyptian and Levantine), where the dental fricatives /θ/ and /ð/ are merged with the dental stops /t/ and /d/, ẓāʾ is pronounced /dˤ/ or /zˤ/ depending on the word; e.g. ظِل is pronounced /dˤɪl/ but ظاهِر is pronounced /zˤaːhɪr/, In loanwords from Classical Arabic ẓāʾ is often /zˤ/, e.g. Egyptian ʿaẓīm (< Classical عظيم ʿaḏ̣īm) "great".

In the varieties (such as Bedouin, Tunisian, and Iraqi), where the dental fricatives are preserved, both ḍād and ẓāʾ are pronounced /ðˤ/. However, there are dialects in South Arabia and in Mauritania where both the letters are kept different but not consistently.

A "de-emphaticized" pronunciation of both letters in the form of the plain /z/ entered into other non-Arabic languages such as Persian, Urdu, Turkish. However, there do exist Arabic borrowings into Ibero-Romance languages as well as Hausa and Malay, where ḍād and ẓāʾ are differentiated.

In English, the sound is sometimes represented by the digraph zh.

Languages / Countries	Pronunciation of the letters	
Languages / Countries	ض	ظ
Modern South Arabian languages (Mehri, Shehri, Harsusi)	/ɬʼ/	/θʼ ~ ðʼ/
Standard Arabic (full distinction)	/dˤ/	/ðˤ/ or /zˤ/
Most of the Arabian Peninsula, Iraq, and Tunisia. Partial in: Libya, Jordan, Syria, and Palestine	/ðˤ/	
Most of Algeria, and Morocco. Partial in: Libya, Tunisia and Yemen	/dˤ/	
Most of Egypt, Sudan, Syria, Lebanon, and Palestine. Partial in: Jordan, and Saudi Arabia	/dˤ/	/dˤ/, /zˤ/*
Mauritania, Partial in: Morocco	/ðˤ/, /dˤ/*	/ðˤ/

Notes:

1. In Mauritania (Hassaniya Arabic), ض is mostly pronounced /ðˤ/ as in /ðˤħak/ ('to laugh'), from */dˤaħika/ ضحك, but /dˤ/ generally appears in the lexemes borrowed from Standard Arabic as in /dˤʕiːf/ ('weak'), from */dˤaʕiːf/ ضعيف.
2. In Egypt, Lebanon, etc, ظ is mostly pronounced /dˤ/ in inherited words as in /dˤalma/ ('darkness'), from */ðˤulma/ ظلمة; /ʕadˤm/ ('bone'), from عظم /ʕaðˤm/, but pronounced /zˤ/ in borrowings from Literary Arabic as in /zˤulm/ ('injustice'); from */ðˤulm/ ظلم.
3. In some accents in Egypt, the emphatic /dˤ/ is pronounced as a plain /d/.

Semitic emphatic sibilant consonants
Proto-Semitic		Old South Arabian	Old North Arabian	Modern South Arabian ^{1}	Standard Arabic		Aramaic		Modern Hebrew		Ge'ez		Phoenician		Akkadian
ṣ	[sʼ] / [tsʼ]	𐩮	𐪎	/sʼ/, rarely /ʃʼ/	ص	/sˤ/	צ	ṣ	צ	/t͡s/	ጸ	ṣ	𐤑	ṣ	ṣ
ṯ̣	[θʼ]	𐩼	𐪜	/θʼ ~ ðˤ/	ظ	/ðˤ/	צ, later ט	*ṱ, ṣ, later ṭ	צ	/t͡s/	ጸ	ṣ	𐤑	ṣ	ṣ
ṣ́	[ɬʼ] / [tɬʼ]	𐩳	𐪓	/ɬʼ/	ض	/dˤ/	ק, later ע	*ṣ́, q/ḳ, later ʿ	צ	/t͡s/	ፀ	ṣ́	𐤑	ṣ	ṣ
Notes: 1. ṯ [θ], ḏ [ð] and ṯ̣ [θʼ] merge with [t], [d], and [tʼ] in Soqotri

=== Romanization ===
Standards for the romanization of Arabic differ on how to represent the letter. Ẓāʾ classically represents /ðˤ/, the velarized or pharyngealized /ˤ/ version of the sound represented by ذ ḏāl, the voiced dental fricative /ð/. In the Latin script the voiced dental fricative, when it is not an allophone of the voiceless dental fricative, is commonly represented by some variation on the letter D, such as Albanian “Dh”, Icelandic “Ð” and Welsh “Dd”. ذ ḏāl is distinguished from د dāl by a point, the two letters being siblings via Phoenician of D (د dāl representing its same voiced alveolar plosive /d/); ذ ḏāl is accordingly romanized per the ISO 233, UNGEGN, and Wikipedia's own standards as “Ḏ”, “Dh” and “Ḏ” respectively. Correspondingly the UNGEGN and Encyclopedia of Arabic Languages and Linguistics standards romanize ظ ẓāʾ as “D͟h” and “Ḏ̣”.

However, the letter ض ḍād represents a pharyngealized version /dˤ/ of د dāl's /d/. Ḍād is accordingly romanized as "Ḍ" per most standards. ظ ẓāʾ, ض ḍād and ذ ḏāl are all three distinguished from a preceding letter (ط, ص, د) by a point above, but their respective sound values /ðˤ, dˤ, ð/ cannot all three be represented by the addition of a dot to D without ambiguity. The Latin alphabet lost what would have been its own Phoenician-derived letters corresponding to ط ṭāʾ and ص ṣād, ϴ and Ϻ, early in its adaptation from the prior Old Italic, Etruscan and Greek alphabets. Owing to these difficulties, standards such as ISO 223 and Wikipedia base their romanization of ẓāʾ on the letter Z, on the basis of ẓāʾ's common modern allophone, /zˤ/.

					BGN/PCGN	UNGEGN	ALA	EI	ISO	BS	EALL	IPA	English
Voiced	د	Dāl	Plos.		d							d	Dense
Voiced	ذ	Ḏāl	Fric.		dh			d͟h	ḏ			ð	Thence
Voiceless	ط	Ṭāʾ	Plos.	Phar.	ţ		ṭ					tˤ	Tense, pharyngealized
Voiced	ظ	Ẓāʾ	Fric.	Phar.	z̧	d͟h	ẓ				ḏ̣	ðˤ	Thence, pharyngealized
Voiceless	ص	Ṣād	Sib.	Phar.	ş		ṣ					sˤ	Sense, pharyngealized
Voiced	ض	Ḍād	Plos.	Phar.	ḑ		ḍ					dˤ	Dense, pharyngealized

In romanization of Urdu, where the letter is called z̤oʾē and pronounced as an un‑pharyngealized voiced alveolar sibilant [z] homophonous with ز zāy (Urdu: zē) after Persian, romanization as “Ẓ” can be confused by the common use of a diacritic dot below to represent retroflexion in romanization of Indic languages, as with “Ṭ” for ٹ ṭē.

== Character encodings ==
Character information
Preview	ظ	
Unicode name	ARABIC LETTER ZAD	
Encodings	decimal	hex
Unicode	1592	U+0638
UTF-8	216 184	D8 B8
Numeric character reference	&#1592;	&#x638;

== See also ==
- Arabic phonology
- Ẓ
- Ḍād
