= Jacob Hoftijzer =

Dutch scholar

Jacob Hoftijzer (11.01.1926—08.11.2011) was a scholar of Semitic languages. He was Professor of Hebrew Language and Literature, the Israelite Antiquities and Ugaritic at Leiden University until his retirement in 1991. That year, a Festschrift was published in his honour, Studies in Hebrew and Aramaic Syntax: Presented to Professor J. Hoftijzer on the Occasion of His Sixty-Fifth Birthday, which included contributions from Jan P. Fokkelman and Takamitsu Muraoka.
