= Hejazi Arabic phonology =

Pronunciation of Hejazi Arabic

The phonological system of the Hejazi Arabic consists of approximately 26 to 28 native consonant phonemes and 8 vowel phonemes: /a, u, i, aː, uː, oː, iː, eː/. Consonant length and vowel length are both distinctive in Hejazi.

Strictly speaking, there are two main groups of dialects spoken in the Hejaz region, one by the urban population originally spoken in the cities of Jeddah, Medina and Mecca where they constitute the majority and partially in Ta'if, and another dialect spoken by the rural or Bedouin populations which is also currently spoken as well in the mentioned cities. However, the term most often applies to the urban variety which is discussed in this article.

- phonemes will be (written inside slashes / /) and allophones (written inside brackets [ ]).

== Consonants ==
Hejazi consonant inventory depends on the speaker. Most speakers use 26 to 28 consonant phonemes in addition to the marginal phoneme /ɫ/, with the phonemes /θ/ ⟨ث⟩ and /ð/ ⟨ذ⟩ being used partially due to the influence of Modern Standard Arabic and neighboring dialects. Being a Semitic language, the four emphatic consonants /sˤ, dˤ, tˤ, zˤ/ are treated as separate phonemes from their plain counterparts.

Consonant phonemes of Hejazi
		Labial	Dental	Denti-alveolar		Palatal	Velar	Pharyngeal	Glottal
		Labial	Dental	plain	emphatic	Palatal	Velar	Pharyngeal	Glottal
Nasal		m		n					
Occlusive	voiceless			t	tˤ		k		ʔ
Occlusive	voiced	b		d	dˤ	d͡ʒ	ɡ		
Fricative	voiceless	f	θ	s	sˤ	ʃ	x	ħ	h
Fricative	voiced		ð	z	ðˤ ~ zˤ		ɣ	ʕ	
Trill				r					
Approximant				l	(ɫ)	j	w		

Phonetic notes:

- the marginal phoneme /ɫ/ (dark l) only occurs in the word الله /aɫːaːh/ ('God') and words derived from it, it contrasts with /l/ in والله /waɫːa/ ('i swear') vs. ولَّا /walːa/ ('or').
- the phonemes /d͡ʒ/ ⟨ج⟩ and the trill /r/ ⟨ر⟩ are realised as a [ʒ] and a tap [ɾ] respectively by a number of speakers or in a number of words.
- the phonemes /ɣ/ ⟨غ⟩ and /x/ ⟨خ⟩ can be realised as uvular fricatives [ʁ] and [χ] in few instances.
- the phoneme /θ/ ⟨ث⟩ is used as an alternative phoneme, while most speakers merge it with /t/ or /s/ depending on the word.
- the phoneme /ð/ ⟨ذ⟩ is used as an alternative phoneme, while most speakers merge it with /d/ or /z/ depending on the word.
- /ðˤ/ can be analyzed as an alternative phoneme for ⟨ظ⟩, while most speakers pronounce it distinctly as /zˤ/ or merge it with ⟨ض⟩ /dˤ/ depending on the word.
- /n/ ⟨ن⟩ has the velar allophone [ŋ], which occurs before velar consonants ⟨ق, ك⟩ /k, ɡ/ as in انكب [aŋkab] ('it spilled') and مِنقَل [mɪŋɡal] ('brazier').
- Consonant clusters like /ts/ and /tʃ/ occur only in foreign words and are not considered to be part of the phonemic inventory but as a sequence e.g. /t/ ⟨ت⟩ and /ʃ/ ⟨ش⟩, in تْشَاد /ˈtʃaːd/ ('Chad').

A notable feature of Hejazi is the pronunciation of ⟨ض⟩ as in Modern Standard Arabic. It is pronounced as /dˤ/ which differentiates it from other dialects in the Arabian Peninsula that merge the phoneme into ⟨ظ⟩ /ðˤ/. Another feature which is shared by many Arabic dialects is the pronunciation of ⟨ق⟩ as a voiced velar /ɡ/, which Ibn Khaldun states may have been the Old Arabic pronunciation of the letter. He has also noted that Quraysh and the Islamic prophet Muhammad may have had the /g/ pronunciation instead of /q/.

Due to the influence of Modern Standard Arabic, [q] has been introduced as an allophone of /ɡ/ ⟨ق⟩ in a few words borrowed from Modern Standard Arabic, such as اقتصاد /igtiˈsˤaːd/ ('economy'), which can be pronounced [ɪqtɪˈsˤaːd] or [ɪgtɪˈsˤaːd], or religious terms as in قرآن /gurˈʔaːn/ ('Quran') which can be pronounced as [qʊrˈʔaːn] by younger speakers or [gʊrˈʔaːn] by older speakers. The two allophones might contrast for a number of speakers, e.g. قرون [gʊˈruːn] ('horns') vs. قرون [qʊˈruːn] ('centuries') which might suggest [q] as a marginal phoneme.

Two foreign phonemes /p/ ⟨پ⟩ and /v/ ⟨ڤ⟩ are used by a number of speakers depending on their foreign language knowledge but many substitute them by /b/ ⟨ب⟩ and /f/ ⟨ف⟩ respectively, but in general /v/ is more integrated and used by most speakers.

=== Illustrative words ===
Example words for consonant phonemes in Hejazi
Phoneme	Example			Phoneme	Example		
/m/	/mahar/	مهر	'Mahr'	/n/	/nahar/	نهر	'river'
/l/	/laħma/	لحمة	'meat'	/r/	/raħma/	رحمة	'mercy'
/f/	/farg/	فرق	'difference'	/b/	/barg/	برق	'lightning'
/ʃ/	/ʃarː/	شر	'evil'	/d͡ʒ/	/d͡ʒarː/	جر	'he pulled'
/k/	/kaʃː/	كش	'he shrank'	/ɡ/	/gaʃː/	قش	'hay'
/x/	/xeːma/	خيمة	'tent'	/ɣ/	/ɣeːma/	غيمة	'cloud'
/ħ/	/ħama/	حمى	'he protected'	/ʕ/	/ʕama/	عمى	'blindness'
/h/	/hams/	همس	'whisper'	/ʔ/	/ʔams/	أمس	'yesterday'
/j/	/jaraga/^{1}	يرقة	'caterpillar'	/w/	/waraga/	ورقة	'paper'
/t/	/tiːn/	تين	'fig'	/d/	/diːn/	دين	'religion'
/s/	/sirː/	سر	'secret'	/z/	/zirː/	زر	'button'
/tˤ/	/tˤaːr/	طار	'he flew'	/dˤ/	/dˤaːr/	ضار	'harmful'
/sˤ/	/sˤarf/	صرف	'expenditure'	/ðˤ ⁓ zˤ/	/ðˤarf/ or /zˤarf/^{2} /ðˤifir/ or /dˤifir/	ظرف ظفر	'envelope' 'nail'
/θ/	/θarwa/ or /sarwa/ /θoːr/ or /toːr/	ثروة ثور	'wealth' 'bull'	/ð/	/ðarwa/ or /zarwa/ /ðeːl/ or /deːl/	ذروة ذيل	'climax' 'tail'
Marginal Phonemes^{3}
/ɫ/	/jaɫːa/	يلا	'c'mon'	only occurs in words derived from الله /aɫːaːh/			
/p/	/poːl/ or /boːl/	پول or بول	'Paul'	/v/	/voːlvu/ or /foːlfu/	ڤولڤو or فولفو	'Volvo'

Notes:

^{1} pronounced [jaraga] or [jaraqa] (Allophones).
^{2} /zˤ/ is a distinct phoneme not a merger, while other alternative pronunciations include mergers with other phonemes.
^{3} /p/ and /v/ occur only in loanwords and can be substituted by /b/ and /f/ respectively depending on the speaker.

=== Glottal Stop ===
The glottal stop /ʔ/ ⟨ء⟩ was lost early on in the Old Hejazi Arabic period. This can be seen in Modern Hejazi as in يقروا /jigru/ "they read" and مايل /maːjil/ "diagonal" vs. Classical Arabic يقرؤوا /jaqraʔuː/ and مائل /maːʔil/. In the initial position, the glottal stop's phonemic value is debatable and most words that begin with a glottal stop according to Classical Arabic orthography can be analyzed as beginning with a vowel rather than a glottal stop. For example, إسورة "bracelet" can be analyzed as /iswara/ or /ʔiswara/ and آكل "I eat" analyzed as /aːkul/ or /ʔaːkul/, but it is still phonemic and distinguished in medial and final positions and distinguished as such in words, as in يسأل /jisʔal/ "he asks" or words under the influence of Modern Standard Arabic such as بيئة /biːʔa/ "environment" and مسؤول /masʔuːl/ "administrator, responsible".

=== Gemination ===
Long (geminate or double) consonants are pronounced exactly like short consonants; they occur between vowels and they are marked with a shaddah if needed, e.g. كَتَّب /katːab/ or /kattab/ kattab "he made (someone) write" vs. كَتَب /katab/ katab "he wrote". They can also occur phonemically at the end of words but are pronounced as a single consonant, not geminated, e.g. فَمّ /famː/ ('mouth') which is pronounced with a single final consonant [fam].

=== Assimilation ===
Consonant assimilation is a phonological process which can occur between two consecutive consonants as in /n/ before /b/ as in جَنْب /d͡ʒanb/ 'next to' → [d͡ʒamb] or [ʒamb] , or between dental consonants; /d/ before /t/ as in أخذت /axadt/ 'I took' → [axat], or /t/ before /dˤ/ as in أَتْضَيَّف /atdˤajːaf/ 'serve myself' → [adˤːajːaf], /tˤ/ before /t/ as in أَنْبَسَطْت /anbaˈsatˤt/ 'I enjoyed it' → [ambaˈsatˤ] which is differentiated from أَنْبَسَطْ /anˈbasatˤ/ "he was flattened / he enjoyed" by the stress, in the former the stress falls on the last syllable while on the latter it falls on the first.

==== Dental Assimilation ====
Grapheme with Standard Arabic phoneme	ث /θ/		ذ /ð/		ض /dˤ/	ظ /ðˤ/	
Example	ثلاثة	ثورة	ذيل	ذنب	ضرر	ظل	ظلم
Common pronunciation in urban Hejazi	ت /t/	س /s/	د /d/	ز /z/	ض /dˤ/		/zˤ/
Common pronunciation in urban Hejazi	/talaːta/	/sawra/	/deːl/	/zanb/	/dˤarar/	/dˤilː/	/zˤulm/
ض - ظ full merger pronunciation	ث /θ/		ذ /ð/		ظ /ðˤ/		
ض - ظ full merger pronunciation	/θalaːθa/	/θawra/	/ðeːl/	/ðanb/	/ðˤarar/	/ðˤilː/	/ðˤulm/

Notes:

1. /zˤ/ is a distinct phoneme, not a merger, e.g. ظَنّ /zˤanː/ ('he thought') vs. زَنّ /zanː/ ('he nagged').
2. The assimilation can also be reflected in the orthography, so ثلاثة /talaːta/ 'three' becomes تلاتة with a /t/ ⟨ت⟩, but most writers keep the Modern Standard Arabic spelling of the words.

The letter ⟨ذ⟩ came to be pronounced /d/ as in ذَهَب /dahab/ 'gold' or /z/ as in ذاكر /zaːkar/ 'he studied', on the other hand ⟨ث⟩ is mostly pronounced /t/ as in ثور /toːr/ 'bull' or rarely /s/ as in ثابت /saːbit/ 'stable'. ⟨ظ⟩ is pronounced distinctly as /zˤ/ in ظاهرة /zˤaːh(i)ra/ 'phenomenon' or merges with /dˤ/ ⟨ض⟩ in other words like ظلام /dˤalaːm/ 'dark' and ظفر /dˤifir/ 'nail'. In contrast ⟨ض⟩ is always pronounced as a /dˤ/ except in words derived from the two trilateral roots ⟨ض ب ط⟩ and ⟨ض ر ط⟩ in which it is pronounced /zˤ/.

Mergers depend on each word, while most words have only one pronunciation, few words have two optional mergers e.g. كذب /kiðib/ might be pronounced as /kidib/ by some speakers or /kizib/ by others. The partial merger between the phonemes has led to some homophones that did not exist in Modern Standard Arabic e.g. تظليل 'dimming' and تضليل 'mislead' both pronounced /tadˤliːl/, while the assimilation of the word ثَانِيَة /θaːnija/ (second; number-two or unit of time) has made a split into two pronunciations (words) /taːnja/ (second; number-two) and /saːnja/ (second; unit of time).

Some speakers pronounce each consonant distinctly as in Standard Arabic while others might refrain from the usage of /s/ as a pronunciation for ⟨ث⟩ and only merge /θ/ with /t/ in most words while keeping /θ/ in others. This phenomenon might be due to the influence of Modern Standard Arabic and neighboring dialects. When speaking or reading Modern Standard Arabic, Hejazi speakers pronounce each consonant distinctly according to its modern standard phonemic value, and any mergers such as the merge between /dˤ/ ⟨ض⟩ and /ðˤ/ ⟨ظ⟩ can be stigmatized.

== Vowels ==
Hejazi has eight vowel phonemes: three short /a/, /u/, /i/ and five long /aː/, /uː/, /oː/, /iː/ and /eː/, with length as a distinctive feature, and four diphthongs: /aw/, /iw/, /aj/ and /ij/ although they are not considered as separate phonemes. Unlike other Arabic dialects, it did not develop allophones for the vowels /a/ and /aː/ in the vicinity of emphatic consonants, and they are always pronounced as an open front [a] or open central [ä] depending on the speaker. Hejazi also retains most of the long and short vowels of Classical Arabic with no vowel reduction, although in a few words /a/ and /aː/ are pronounced with an open back [ɑ].

The main phonological feature that differentiates urban Hejazi from the neighboring dialects of the Arabian Peninsula and the Levant is the constant use of full vowels and absence of vowel reduction (use of the schwa [ə]). For example قلت لك 'I told you' (to a female), is pronounced [gʊltalːɪk] or [gʊltalɪk] in Hejazi with full vowels but pronounced with the reduced vowel [ə] as [gəltələk] in most of the Gulf region or [ʔəltəlːek] in Lebanese and urban Syrian. It also retains the Classical mid breaking vowels as in بَناتَكُم ("your dauɡhters") [banaːtakʊm] in Hejazi as opposed to [bænætkʊm] or [bænætku] in Egyptian and [banaːtkʊm] Najdi and rural Hejazi.

Most inherited words with the diphthongs /aj/ and /aw/ from the Old Arabic period underwent monophthongization in Hejazi and are realized as the long vowels /eː/ and /oː/ respectively. However, they are still preserved in many words such as حيوان /ħajwaːn/ 'animal', and have resurfaced in a number of words borrowed later from Modern Standard Arabic. This created a contrast with the inherited monophthongized words as in inherited صوتي /sˤoːti/ 'my voice' vs. borrowed صَوْتي /sˤawti/ 'acoustic', and inherited عيني /ʕeːni/ 'my eye' vs. borrowed عَيْني /ʕajni/ 'ophthalmic'. Not all instances of mid vowels are a result of monophthongization — some are from grammatical processes قالوا /gaːlu/ 'they said' → قالوا لها /gaːˈloːlaha/ 'they said to her' (opposed to Classical Arabic قالوا لها /qaːluː lahaː/), and some occur in portmanteau words e.g. ليش /leːʃ/ 'why?' (from Classical Arabic لأي /liʔaj/ 'for what' and شيء /ʃajʔ/ 'thing').

Example of borrowed vs. inherited terms
Example (without diacritics)	Meaning	Hejazi Arabic	Modern Standard Arabic
عيني	ophthalmic	/ʕajni/ (borrowed term)	/ʕajni/
عيني	my eye	/ʕeːni/ (inherited form)	/ʕajni/
عيني	aid! (command)	/ʕiːni/	/ʕiːni/
عيني	appoint! (command)	/ʕajːini/	/ʕajːini/

The pronunciation of word initial and medial /u/ and /i/ depends on the nature of the surrounding consonants, whether the syllable is stressed or unstressed, the accent of the speaker, and rate of speech. As a general rule, word initial or medial /u/ is pronounced [ʊ], but strictly as [u] at the end of a word or before /w/ (as in هُوَّ [huwːa]). Word initial or medial /i/ is pronounced [ɪ], and strictly as an [i] at the end of the word or before /j/ (as in هِيَّ [hijːa]), though this complementary distribution in allophones is not found among all speakers of Hejazi and some use [u] and [i] in all positions.

Hejazi Arabic vowel chart, from Abdoh (2010:84)

Vowel phonemes of Hejazi Arabic
	Short		Long	
	Front	Back	Front	Back
Close	i	u	iː	uː
Mid	i	u	eː	oː
Open	a		aː	

Phonetic notes:

- /a/ and /aː/ are pronounced either as an open front vowel [a] or an open central vowel [ä] depending on the speaker, even when adjacent to emphatic consonants.
  - [ɑ] is an allophone for /aː/ and /a/ in some words such as ألمانيا [almɑːnja] ('Germany'), يابان [jaːbɑːn] ('Japan'), بابا [bɑːbɑ] ('dad') and Japan'), ماما [mɑːmɑ] ('mom').
- long /oː/ and /eː/ are pronounced as true-mid vowels [o̞ː] and [e̞ː] respectively.
- long /uː/ and /iː/ are pronounced as [uː] and [iː] respectively.
- short /u/ (also analyzed as /ʊ/) has two main pronunciations:
  - lax [ʊ] or less likely [o̞] in word initial or medial syllables, e.g. فُك /fukː/ ('unseal!') pronounced [fʊk] and أُخْته /(ʔ)uxtu/ ('his sister') pronounced [ʊxtu] with a lax initial [ʊ] and a tense final [u].
  - tense [u] at the end of words or before [w] or when isolate, although short [o̞] can occur at the end of a foreign word but that depends on the speaker's knowledge of the foreign language.
- short /i/ (also analyzed as /ɪ/) has two main pronunciations:
  - lax [ɪ] or less likely [e̞] in word initial or medial syllables, e.g. قِرْفَة /girfa/ ('cinnamon') pronounced [gɪrfa] and إنْتِ /(ʔ)inti/ ('you') pronounced [ɪnti] with a lax initial [ɪ] and a tense final [i].
  - tense [i] at the end of words or before [j] or when isolate, although short [e̞] can occur at the end of a foreign word but that depends on the speaker's knowledge of the foreign language.

The close vowels can be distinguished by tenseness with long /uː/ and /iː/ being more tense in articulation than their short counterparts [ʊ ~ o̞] and [ɪ ~ e̞] in medial position, except at the end of words where they are all tense, e.g. short في [fi] ('in') and long فيه [fiː] ('in him', 'there is').

Example words for vowel phonemes
Phoneme	Allophones	Position in the word	Example		Phonemic	Phonetic	Meaning
/a/	[a] or [ä]	all	فَم	famm	/ˈfamː/	[ˈfam] or [ˈfäm]	'mouth'
/u/	[u]	final or before [w] or isolate	ربو	rabu	/ˈrabu/	[ˈrabu]	'asthma'
/u/	[ʊ] or less likely [o̞]	initial or medial	جُغْمَة	juḡma	/ˈd͡ʒuɣma/	[ˈd͡ʒʊɣma] or [ˈd͡ʒo̞ɣma]	'sip'
/i/	[i]	final or before [j] or isolate	لوني	lōni	/ˈloːni/	[ˈlo̞ːni]	'my color'
/i/	[ɪ] or less likely [e̞]	initial or medial	طِب	ṭibb	/ˈtˤibː/	[ˈtˤɪb] or [ˈtˤe̞b]	'medicine'
/aː/	[aː] or [äː]	all	فاز	fāz	/ˈfaːz/	[ˈfaːz] or [ˈfäːz]	'he won'
/uː/	[uː]	all	فوز	fūz	/ˈfuːz/	[ˈfuːz]	'win!' (Imperative)
/oː/	[o̞ː]	all	فوز	fōz	/ˈfoːz/	[ˈfo̞ːz]	'victory'
/iː/	[iː]	all	دين	dīn	/ˈdiːn/	[ˈd̪iːn]	'religion'
/eː/	[e̞ː]	all	دين	dēn	/ˈdeːn/	[ˈd̪e̞ːn]	'debt'

=== Phonological processes ===
The linking conjunction و ('and') pronounced [u] is often linked with the consonant (before it) or the vowel (before or after it) or for emphasis only left as-is :-

- ِانا و إنتِ /ana u inti/ ('me and you') is either pronounced as [anaw ɪnti], where [u] is connected to the vowel before it, or pronounced as [ana wɪnti], where [u] is connected to the vowel after it, or left as-is for emphasis [ana u ɪnti].
- واحد و خمسين /waːħid u xamsiːn/ ('fifty one') is either pronounced [waːħɪdu xamsiːn] or for emphasis [waːħɪd u xamsiːn].
- خمسة و سبعين /xamsa u sabʕiːn/ ('seventy five') is either pronounced [xamsaw sabʕiːn] or for emphasis [xamsa u sabʕiːn].

Operation	Original	After operation (phonemic)	Pronunciation (phonetic)
Vowel shortening (word final)	قول /guːl/ 'tell' + لهم /lahum/ them'	قل لهم /gullahum/	[ˈgʊlːahʊm] 'tell them'
Vowel lengthening (word final)	قريوا /girju/ 'they read' + ـها /-ha/ 'it (fem.)'	قِرْيوها /girˈjoːha/	[ˈgɪrjo̞ːha] 'they read it'
Vowel deletion (syncope)	لا /laː/ 'don't' + تقول /tiguːl/ 'say'	لا تقول /laː.tiguːl/	[laː.tguːl] 'don't say'

==== Vowel Shortening ====
Medial vowel shortening occurs before indirect object pronouns (e.g., لي ,له ,لها), where a medial word long vowel (⟨ي⟩ ,⟨ا⟩ and ⟨و⟩) in verbs is shortened. For example, عاد /ʕaːd/ "he repeated" becomes عاد لهم /ʕadlahum/ "he repeated to them" and رايحين له "going to him" is pronounced /raːjħinlu/ with a shortened /i/ and rarely /raːjħiːnlu/. This can also affect the spelling of the words depending on the writer, e.g. نروح becomes نرح لهم without the long vowel or it can be written نروح لهم but this does not effect third person masculine past verbs as in the example below.

Vowel shortening also occurs only in few words as in جاي "I'm coming" pronounced /d͡ʒaj/ or /d͡ʒaːj/.

Tense/Mood		Past "went"		Present (Indicative) "write"		Imperative "write!"	
Person		Singular	Plural	Singular	Plural	Singular	Plural
1st		رحت له ruḥt-allu	رحنا له ruḥnā-lu	أرح له or أروح له ʼaruḥ-lu	نرح له or نروح له niruḥ-lu		
2nd	masculine	رحت له ruḥt-allu	رحتوا له ruḥtū-lu	ترح له or تروح له tiruḥ-lu	تروحوا له tirūḥū-lu	رح له or روح له ruḥ-lu	روحوا له rūḥū-lu
2nd	feminine	رحتي له ruḥtī-lu	رحتوا له ruḥtū-lu	تروحي له tirūḥī-lu	تروحوا له tirūḥū-lu	روحي له rūḥī-lu	روحوا له rūḥū-lu
3rd	masculine	راح له raḥ-lu	راحوا له rāḥō-lu	يرح له or يروح له yiruḥ-lu	يروحوا له yirūḥū-lu		
3rd	feminine	راحت له rāḥat-lu	راحوا له rāḥō-lu	ترح له or تروح له tiruḥ-lu	يروحوا له yirūḥū-lu		

==== Vowel lengthening ====
Most word-final long vowels from the Classical period have been shortened in Hejazi but they are lengthened when suffixed, as in يزهموا /jizhamu/ "they call" → يزهموها /jizhamuːha/ "they call her".

== Bibliography ==
- Abdoh, Eman Mohammed Abdulrahman (May 2010). A Study of the Phonological Structure and Representation of First Words in Arabic (PDF) (PhD dissertation). University of Leicester. Archived from the original (PDF) on 2018-11-01.
- Alzaidi, Muhammad Swaileh A. (2014). Information Structure and Intonation in Hijazi Arabic (PDF) (PhD dissertation). University of Essex.
- Omar, Margaret K. (1975). Saudi Arabic: Urban Hijazi Dialect (PDF). Basic Course series. Washington, DC: Foreign Service Institute. Archived from the original (PDF) on 2021-05-23.
- Watson, Janet C. E. (2002). The Phonology and Morphology of Arabic (PDF). Archived from the original (PDF) on 2016-03-01.
