= Hejazi Arabic =

Variety of Arabic spoken in the Hejaz region of Saudi Arabia

- حجازي (Ḥijāzi)
- Pronunciation: Hejazi Arabic pronunciation: [ħɪˈ(d)ʒaːzi]
- Native to: Saudi Arabia
- Region: Hejaz
- Speakers: 11 million (2018)
- Language family: Afro-Asiatic: Semitic; West Semitic; Central Semitic; Arabic; Peninsular; Hejazi Arabic
- Early form: Old Hejazi
- Dialects: Rural Hejazi
- Writing system: Arabic alphabet

Language codes
- ISO 639-3: acw
- Glottolog: hija1235
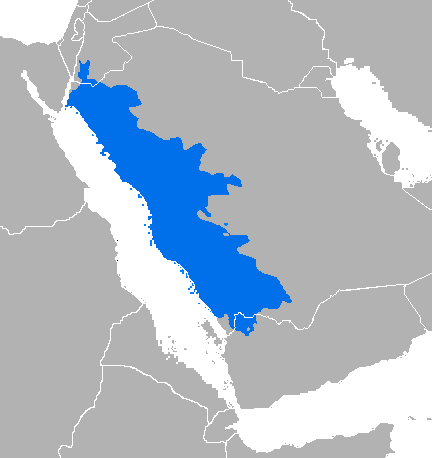
- Extent of Hejazi Arabic

Hejazi Arabic or Hijazi Arabic (Arabic: اللهجة الحجازية, romanized: al-lahja al-ḥijāziyya, Hejazi Arabic: حجازي, pronounced [ħɪˈ(d)ʒaːzi]), also known as West Arabian Arabic, is a variety of Arabic spoken in the Hejaz region of Saudi Arabia. Strictly speaking, there are two main groups of dialects spoken in the Hejaz region, one by the urban population, originally spoken mainly in the cities of Jeddah, Mecca, Medina and partially in Ta'if and another dialect by the urbanized rural and bedouin populations. However, the term most often applies to the urban variety which is discussed in this article.

In antiquity, the Hejaz was home to the Old Hejazi dialect of Arabic recorded in the consonantal text of the Qur'an. Old Hejazi is distinct from modern Hejazi Arabic, and represents an older linguistic layer wiped out by centuries of migration, but which happens to share the imperative prefix vowel /a-/ with the modern dialect.

== Classification ==
Also referred to as the sedentary Hejazi dialect, this is the form most commonly associated with the term "Hejazi Arabic", and is spoken in the urban centers of the region, such as Jeddah, Mecca, and Medina. With respect to the axis of bedouin versus sedentary dialects of the Arabic language, this dialect group exhibits features of both. Like other sedentary dialects, the urban Hejazi dialect is less conservative than the bedouin varieties in some aspects and has therefore shed some Classical forms and features that are still present in bedouin dialects, these include gender-number disagreement, and the feminine marker -n (see Varieties of Arabic). But in contrast to bedouin dialects, the constant use of full vowels and the absence of vowel reduction plus the distinction between the emphatic letters ⟨ض⟩ and ⟨ظ⟩ is generally retained.

=== Innovative features ===
1. The present progressive tense is marked by the prefix بـ /b/ or قاعد /gaːʕid/ or جالس /d͡ʒaːlis/ as in بيدرس /bijidrus/ or قاعد يدرس /gaːʕid jidrus/ or جالس يدرس /d͡ʒaːlis jidrus/ ("he is studying").
2. The future tense is marked by the prefix حـ /ħa/ as in حيدرس /ħajidrus/ ("he will study").
3. the internal passive form, which in Hejazi, is replaced by the pattern (اَنْفَعَل /anfaʕal/, يِنْفَعِل /jinfaʕil/) or (اَتْفَعَل /atfaʕal/, يِتْفَعِل /jitfaʕil/).
4. Loss of the final /h/ sound in the 3rd person masculine singular pronoun ـه. For example, بيته /beːtu/ ("his house"), أعرفه /aʕrifu/ ("I know him"), قالوه /gaːˈloː/ ("they said it"), عليه /ʕaˈleː/ ("on him") and شفناه /ʃufˈnaː/ ("we saw him") vs. شفنا /ʃufna/ ("we saw") .
5. loss of gender-specificity in numbers except for the number "one" which is واحد m. /waːħid/ and وحدة f. /waħda/.
6. The pronunciation of the interdental letters ⟨ث⟩ ,⟨ذ⟩, and ⟨ظ⟩. (See Hejazi Arabic Phonology)
7. loss of gender-specificity in plural verb forms, e.g. يركبوا /jirkabu/ instead of masculine يركبون /jarkabuːna/ and feminine يركبن /jarkabna/.
8. loss of gender-specificity in plural adjectives, e.g. طفشانين /tˤafʃaːniːn/ "bored" can be used to describe both feminine and masculine plural nouns.
9. The verb forms V, VI and IIQ have an additional initial ⟨ا⟩ /a/, e.g. اتْكَسّر /atkasːar/ "it shattered" (V), اتْعامَلَت /atʕaːmalat/ "she worked" (VI) and اتْفَلْسَفوا /atfalsafu/ "they babbled" (IIQ).

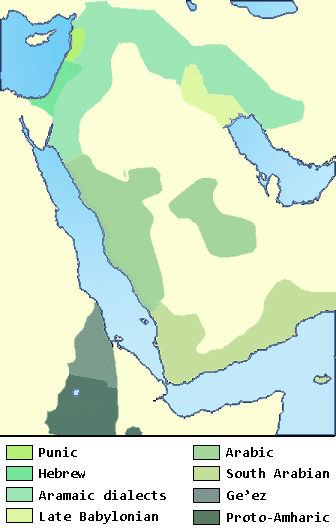
Approximate distribution of Arabic language around the 1st century in Hejaz and Najd

=== Conservative features ===
1. Hejazi Arabic does not employ double negation, nor does it append the negation particles -sh to negate verbs: Hejazi ما أَعْرِف /maː aʕrif/ ("I don't know"), as opposed to Egyptian معرفش /maʕrafʃ/ and Palestinian بعرفش /baʕrafiʃ/.
2. The habitual present tense is not marked by any prefixes as in يِدْرُس /jidrus/ ("he studies") and أحبك /ʔaħːubːik/ ("I love you"), as opposed to Egyptian بيدرس /bijidrus/ and بحبك /baħːibːik/.
3. The prohibitive mood of Classical Arabic is preserved in the imperative: لا تروح /laː tiruːħ/ ("don't go").
4. The possessive suffixes are generally preserved in their Classical forms. For example, بيتكم /beːtakum/ "your (pl) house".
5. The plural first person pronoun is نِحْنَ /niħna/ or إحنا /iħna/, as opposed to حنّا /ħənna/ or إنّا /ənna/.
6. When indicating a location, the preposition في /fi/ (also written as a prefix فِـ) is preferred to بـ /b/ as in في المدينة or فالمدينة /fil.madiːna/ ("in Medina").
7. The standard pronunciation of the ⟨ض⟩ is /dˤ/ as in Modern Standard Arabic e.g. الرياض ("Riyadh") is pronounced /ar.rijaːdˤ/ not /ar.rijaːðˤ/.
8. The hamzated verbs like أخذ /ʔaxad/ and أكل /ʔakal/ keep their classical form as opposed to خذا /xaða/ and كلى /kala/.
9. The use of /u/ in form I-verbs is retained as in قُلْت [gʊlt], شُفْت [ʃʊft] and نُطْق [nʊtˤg] as opposed to [gəlt], [ʃəft] and [nətˤg] in Najdi and Gulf dialects.
10. The glottal stop can be added to final syllables ending in a vowel as a way of emphasising.
11. the definite article الـ is always pronounced /al/ as opposed to Egyptian or Kuwaiti /il/ and the final ـة is always pronounced /a/.
12. Compared to neighboring dialects, urban Hejazi retains most of the short vowels of Classical Arabic with no vowel reduction or ghawa syndrome, for example:

سَمَكَة /sa.ma.ka/ ("fish"), as opposed to [sməka],
ضَرَبَتُه /dˤa.ra.ba.tu/ ("she hit him"), as opposed to [ðˤrabətah].
وَلَدُه /wa.la.du/ ("his son"), as opposed to [wlədah].
عَلَيَّ /ʕa.la.jːa/ ("on me"), as opposed to [ʕalaj].
جيبَنَا /d͡ʒeː.ba.na/ ("our pocket") and عيلَتِي /ʕeː.la.ti/ ("my family"), as opposed to Najdi [d͡ʒeːbna] and [ʕeːlti] and Egyptian [gebna] and [ʕelti].
عِنْدَكُم /ʕin.da.kum/ ("in your possession" pl.), as opposed to Najdi [ʕəndəkum], Egyptian [ʕandoku], and Levantine [ʕandkon].

== History ==
The Arabic of today is derived principally from the old dialects of Central and North Arabia which were divided by the classical Arab grammarians into three groups: Hejaz, Najd, and the language of the tribes in adjoining areas. Though the modern Hejazi dialects has developed markedly since the development of Classical Arabic, and Modern Standard Arabic is quite distinct from the modern dialect of Hejaz. Standard Arabic now differs considerably from modern Hejazi Arabic in terms of its phonology, morphology, syntax, and lexicon, such diglossia in Arabic began to emerge at the latest in the sixth century CE when oral poets recited their poetry in a proto-Classical Arabic based on archaic dialects which differed greatly from their own.

Urban Hejazi Arabic belongs to the western Peninsular Arabic branch of the Arabic language, which itself is a Semitic language. It includes features of both urban and bedouin dialects given its development in the historical cities of Jeddah, Medina and Mecca in proximity to the bedouin tribes that lived on the outskirts of these cities, in addition to a minimal influence in vocabulary from other urban Arabic dialects and Modern Standard Arabic, and more recently the influence of the other dialects of Saudi Arabia, all of which made Urban Hejazi a dialect that is distinctly unique but close to peninsular dialects on one hand and urban Arabic dialects on the other.

Historically, it is not well known in which stage of Arabic the shift from the Proto-Semitic pair /q/ qāf and /g/ gīm came to be Hejazi /g, d͡ʒ/ gāf and jīm ⟨ج, ق⟩, although it has been attested as early as the eighth century CE, and it can be explained by a chain shift /q/* → /g/ → /d͡ʒ/ that occurred in one of two ways:

1. Drag Chain: Proto-Semitic gīm /g/ palatalized to Hejazi jīm /d͡ʒ/ first, opening up a space at the position of [g], which qāf /q/* then moved to fill the empty space resulting in Hejazi gāf /g/, restoring structural symmetrical relationships present in the pre-Arabic system.
2. Push Chain: Proto-Semitic qāf /q/* changed to Hejazi gāf /g/ first, which resulted in pushing the original gīm /g/ forward in articulation to become Hejazi jīm /d͡ʒ/, but since most modern qāf dialects as well as standard Arabic also have jīm, then the push-chain of qāf to gāf first can be discredited, although there are good grounds for believing that old Arabic qāf had both voiced [g] and voiceless [q] as allophones; and later on the gīm /g/ was fronted to jīm /d͡ʒ/, possibly as a result of pressure from the allophones.

The development of /q/ to /g/ have also been observed in languages like Azerbaijani in which the Old Turkic [q] is pronounced as a velar [g]; e.g. قال / qal 'to stay, remain' is pronounced /ɡal/, rather than /kal/ as in Turkish or /qal/ in Bashkir, Uyghur, Kazakh, etc.

== Phonology ==
In general, Hejazi native phonemic inventory consists of 26 (with no interdental /θ, ð/) to 28 consonant phonemes depending on the speaker's preference, in addition to the marginal phoneme /ɫ/. Furthermore, it has an eight-vowel system, consisting of three short and five long vowels /a, u, i; aː, uː, oː, iː, eː/. Consonant length and Vowel length are both distinctive and being an Arabic dialect the four emphatic consonants /sˤ, dˤ, tˤ, zˤ/ are treated as separate phonemes from their plain counterparts.

The main phonological feature that differentiates urban Hejazi from other peninsular dialects in regards to consonants is the pronunciation of the letters ⟨ث⟩ ,⟨ذ⟩, and ⟨ظ⟩ (see Hejazi Phonology) and the standard pronunciation of ⟨ض⟩ /dˤ/ as in Standard Arabic. The stop pronunciations of the interdentals, [t], [d] and [dˤ], are shared with the Baharna dialect spoken in Qatif in Saudi Arabia's Eastern Province.Another differential feature is the lack of palatalization for the letters ك /k/, ق /g/ and ج /d͡ʒ/, unlike in other peninsular dialects where they can be palatalized in certain positions e.g. Hejazi جديد 'new' [d͡ʒadiːd] vs. Gulf Arabic [jɪdiːd] and Hejazi عندك 'with you' [ʕɪn.dɪk] vs. traditional Najdi [ʕən.dət͡s].

The marginal /ɫ/ is only used in the word الله 'God' /aɫːaːh/ (except when it follows an /i/ as in بسمِ الله /bismilːaːh/) and in words derived from it. It contrasts with /l/ in والله 'I swear' /waɫːa/ vs. ولَّا 'or' /walːa/. Unlike other neighboring dialects; /l/ is not velarized in certain positions, as in عقل 'brain' pronounced with a light lām [ʕa.ɡɪl] in Hejazi and velarized one [ʕa.ɡəɫ] in other peninsular Arabic dialects. Two additional foreign sounds /p/ ⟨پ⟩ and /v/ ⟨ڤ⟩ are used by a number of speakers while many substitute them with /b/ ⟨ب⟩ and /f/ ⟨ف⟩ respectively, in general /v/ is more integrated and used by more speakers than /p/.

A conservative feature that Hejazi holds is the constant use of full vowels and the absence of vowel reduction, for example قلنا لهم 'we told them', is pronounced [gʊlnaːlahʊm] in Hejazi with full vowels but pronounced with the reduced vowel [ə] as [gəlnaːləhəm] in Najdi and Gulf Arabic, in addition to that, the absence of initial consonant cluster (known as the ghawa syndrome) as in بَقَرة 'cow', قَهْوة 'coffee', نِعْرِف 'we know' and سِمْعَت 'she heard' which are pronounced [bagara], [gahwa], [nɪʕrɪf] and [sɪmʕat] respectively in Hejazi but [bgara], [ghawa], [nʕarɪf] and [smaʕat] in other peninsular dialects.

=== Consonants ===
Consonant phonemes of Hejazi
		Labial	Dental	Denti-alveolar/Alveolar		Palatal	Velar	Pharyngeal	Glottal
		Labial	Dental	plain	emphatic	Palatal	Velar	Pharyngeal	Glottal
Nasal		m		n					
Occlusive	voiceless			t	tˤ		k		ʔ
Occlusive	voiced	b		d	dˤ	d͡ʒ	ɡ		
Fricative	voiceless	f	θ	s	sˤ	ʃ	x	ħ	h
Fricative	voiced		ð	z	ðˤ ~ zˤ		ɣ	ʕ	
Trill				r					
Approximant				l	(ɫ)	j	w		

Phonetic notes:

- the affricate /d͡ʒ/ ⟨ج⟩ is realised as a fricative [ʒ] and the trill /r/ ⟨ر⟩ is realised a tap [ɾ] by a number of speakers or in a number of words.
- the phonemes /ɣ/ ⟨غ⟩ and /x/ ⟨خ⟩ can be realised as uvular fricatives [ʁ] and [χ] respectively in a few instances.
- the phoneme /θ/ ⟨ث⟩ is used as an alternative phoneme, while many speakers merge it with /t/ or /s/ depending on the word.
- the phoneme /ð/ ⟨ذ⟩ is used as an alternative phoneme, while many speakers merge it with /d/ or /z/ depending on the word.
- /ðˤ/ can be analyzed as an alternative phoneme for ⟨ظ⟩, while many speakers pronounce it distinctly as /zˤ/ or merge it with /dˤ/ ⟨ض⟩ depending on the word.
- ⟨ض⟩ and ⟨ظ⟩ merge into /ðˤ/ for a number of speakers due to the influence of neighboring dialects.
- /n/ ⟨ن⟩ has the velar allophone [ŋ], which occurs before stop velars ⟨ق, ك⟩ /k, ɡ/ as in انكب [aŋkab] ('it spilled') and مِنقَل [mɪŋɡal] ('brazier') and [ɱ] is an allophone before ⟨ف⟩ /f/ as in قُرُنْفُل /gurunful/ ('clove') which is pronounced [gʊrʊɱʊl].
- due to the influence of Modern Standard Arabic, [q] has been introduced as an allophone of /ɡ/ ⟨ق⟩ in some words and phrases especially in the scientific and religious fields as in اقتصاد ('economy') which is phonemically /iɡtiˈsˤaːd/ but can be pronounced as [ɪgtɪˈsˤaːd] or [ɪqtɪˈsˤaːd] depending on the speaker, although older speakers prefer [g] in all positions.
- Word-Initial clusters like /tʃ/, /ts/ or /dz/ occur only in loanwords and they are not considered to be a single phoneme but a cluster of two sounds, e.g. /t/ ⟨ت⟩ and /ʃ/ ⟨ش⟩ as in تْشِيلي /ˈtʃiːli/ ('Chile'), this cluster has merged with /ʃ/ in earlier loanwords that are more integrated e.g. شَيَّك /ʃajːak/ ('he checked’) from English check. Clusters can occur phonetically in native words affected by syncope when connected, e.g. لا تِشِيلِي /ˈlaː tiʃiːli/ ('don't lift') pronounced [ˈlaː.tʃiːli] or [ˈlaː.tɪʃiːli].

=== Vowels ===
Hejazi Arabic vowel chart, from Abdoh (2010:84)

Vowel phonemes of Hejazi
	Short		Long	
	Front	Back	Front	Back
Close	i	u	iː	uː
Mid	i	u	eː	oː
Open	a		aː	

Phonetic notes:

- /a/ and /aː/ are pronounced either as an open front vowel [a] or an open central vowel [ä] depending on the speaker, even when adjacent to emphatic consonants, except in some words such as ألمانيا [almɑːnja] ('Germany'), يابان [jaːbɑːn] ('Japan') and بابا [bɑːbɑ] ('dad') where they are pronounced with the back vowel [ɑ].
- /oː/ and /eː/ are pronounced as true mid vowels [o̞ː] and [e̞ː] respectively.
- short /u/ (also analyzed as /ʊ/) is pronounced allophonically as [ʊ] or less likely [o̞] in word initial or medial syllables e.g. أخت [ʔʊxt] ('sister') and مشط [mʊʃʊtˤ] ('comb') and strictly as [u] at the end of words e.g. شافوا [ʃaːfu] ('they saw') or before [w] as in هُوَّ [huwːa] ('he') or when isolate.
- short /i/ (also analyzed as /ɪ/) is pronounced allophonically as [ɪ] or less likely [e̞] in word initial or medial syllables e.g. إسلام [ʔɪslaːm] ('Islam') and قسم [gɪsɪm] ('section') and strictly as [i] at the end of words e.g. عندي [ʕɪndi] ('I have') or before [j] as in هِيَّ [hijːa] ('he') or when isolate.
- the close vowels can be distinguished by tenseness with /uː/ and /iː/ being more tense in articulation than their short counterparts [ʊ ~ o̞] and [ɪ ~ e̞], except at the end of words where they are all tense even in loanwords, e.g. شِكاقو [ʃɪˈkaːɡu] ('Chicago') which is less likely to be pronounced [ʃɪˈkaːɡo̞].
- The diphthongs: /aw/, /aj/, /iw/ e.g. يِوْقَف [jɪwgaf] ('he stops') and /ij/ e.g. بيقول [bɪjguːl] ('he's saying') (also pronounced [bɪjɪguːl] for emphasis) are not considered as separate phonemes.

==== Monophthongization ====
Most of the occurrences of the two diphthongs /aj/ and /aw/ in the Classical Arabic period underwent monophthongization in Hejazi, and are realized as the long vowels /eː/ and /oː/ respectively, but they are still preserved as diphthongs in a number of words which created a contrast with the long vowels /uː/, /oː/, /iː/ and /eː/.

Example (without diacritics)	Meaning	Hejazi Arabic	Modern Standard Arabic
دوري	league	/dawri/	/dawri/
دوري	my turn	/doːri/	/dawri/
دوري	turn around!	/duːri/	/duːri/
دوري	search!	/dawːiri/	/dawːiri/

Not all instances of mid vowels are a result of monophthongization, some are from grammatical processes قالوا /gaːlu/ 'they said' → قالوا لها /gaːloːlaha/ 'they said to her' (opposed to Classical Arabic قالوا لها /qaːluː lahaː/), and some occur in modern Portmanteau words e.g. ليش /leːʃ/ 'why?' (from Classical Arabic لأي /liʔaj/ 'for what' and شيء /ʃajʔ/ 'thing').

== Vocabulary ==
Hejazi vocabulary derives primarily from Arabic Semitic roots. The urban Hejazi vocabulary differs in some respect from that of other dialects in the Arabian Peninsula. For example, there are fewer specialized terms related to desert life, and more terms related to seafaring and fishing. Loanwords are uncommon and they are mainly of French, Italian, Persian, Turkish and most recently of English origins, and due to the diverse origins of the inhabitants of Hejazi cities, some loanwords are used by only some families. Some old loanwords are fading or became obsolete due to the influence of Modern Standard Arabic and their association with lower social class and education, e.g. كنديشن /kunˈdeːʃan/ "air conditioner" (from English condition) was replaced by Standard Arabic مكيّف /mukajːif/.

Words that are distinctly of Hejazi origin include دحين /daħiːn/ or /daħeːn/ "now", إيوه /(ʔ)iːwa/ "yes", إيش /ʔeːʃ/ "what?", أبغى /ʔabɣa/ "I want", ديس /deːs/ "breast" (used with the more formal صدر /sˤadir/), فهيقة /fuheːga/ "hiccup", and قد /ɡid/ or قيد /ɡiːd/ "already", Other general vocabulary includes ندر /nadar/ "to leave" with its synonyms خرج /xarad͡ʒ/ and طلع /tˤiliʕ/, زهم /zaham/ "to call over" with its synonym نادى /naːda/ and بالتوفيق /bitːawfiːg/ "good luck". (see vocabulary list)

Most of the loanwords tend to be nouns e.g. بسكليتة /buskuleːta/ "bicycle", بنزهير /banzaheːr/ "lime", قمبري /gambari/ "shrimp" and جَزْمَة /d͡ʒazma/ "shoe", and sometimes with a change of meaning as in: كبري /kubri/ "overpass" from Turkish "köprü" originally meaning "bridge" and وَايْت /waːjt/ "water tanker truck" from English "white", loaned verbs are rare and they follow the same grammatical rules, e.g. هَكَّر /hakːar/ "to hack" from English "hack" and نَرْفَز /narfaz/ "to agitate" from French "nerveux" or English "nervous".

=== Portmanteau ===
A common feature in Hejazi vocabulary is portmanteau words (also called a blend in linguistics); in which parts of multiple words or their phones (sounds) are combined into a new word, it is especially innovative in making interrogative words, examples include:

- إيوه (/ʔiːwa/, "yes"): from إي (/ʔiː/, "yes") and و (/wa/, "and") and الله (/aɫːaːh/, "god").
- معليش (/maʕleːʃ/, is it ok?/sorry): from ما (/maː/, nothing) and عليه (/ʕalajh/, on him) and شيء (/ʃajʔ/, thing).
- إيش (/ʔeːʃ/, "what?"): from أي (/aj/, "which") and شيء (/ʃajʔ/, "thing").
- ليش (/leːʃ/, "why?"): from لأي (/liʔaj/, for what) and شيء (/ʃajʔ/, "thing").
- فين (/feːn/, where?): from في (/fiː/, in) and أين (/ʔajn/, where).
- إلين (/ʔileːn/, "until"): from إلى (/ʔilaː/, "to") and أن (/an/, "that").
- دحين (/daħiːn/ or /daħeːn/, "now"): from ذا (/ðaː/, "this") and الحين (/alħiːn/, part of time).
- بعدين (/baʕdeːn/, later): from بعد (baʕd, after) and أَيْن (ʔayn, part of time).
- علشان or عشان (/ʕalaʃaːn/ or /ʕaʃaːn/, "in order to"): from على (/ʕalaː/, "on") and شأن (/ʃaʔn/, "matter").
- كمان (/kamaːn/, "also"): from كما (/kamaː/, "like") and أن (/ʔan/, "that").
- يلّا (/jaɫːa/, come on): from يا (/jaː/, "o!") and الله (/aɫːaːh/, "god").
- لسّة or لسّا or لِسَّع (/lisːa/ or /li.sːaʕ/, not yet, still): from للساعة (/lisːaːʕa/, "to the hour") also used as in لِسّاعه صغير /lisːaːʕu sˤaɣiːr/ ("he is still young")

=== Numerals ===
The Cardinal number system in Hejazi is much more simplified than the Classical Arabic

numbers 1–10	IPA	11-20	IPA	10s	IPA	100s	IPA
1 واحد	/waːħid/	11 احدعش	/iħdaʕaʃ/	10 عشرة	/ʕaʃara/	100 مية	/mijːa/
2 اتنين	/itneːn/ or /iθneːn/	12 اتطنعش	/itˤnaʕaʃ/ or /iθnaʕaʃ/	20 عشرين	/ʕiʃriːn/	200 ميتين	/mijteːn/ or /mijːateːn/
3 تلاتة	/talaːta/ or /θalaːθa/	13 تلتطعش	/talat.tˤaʕaʃ/ or /θalaθ.tˤaʕaʃ/	30 تلاتين	/talaːtiːn/ or /θalaːθiːn/	300 تلتميَّة	/tultumijːa/ or /θulθumijːa/
4 أربعة	/arbaʕa/	14 أربعطعش	/arbaʕ.tˤaʕaʃ/	40 أربعين	/arbiʕiːn/	400 أربعميَّة	/urbuʕmijːa/
5 خمسة	/xamsa/	15 خمسطعش	/xamis.tˤaʕaʃ/ or /xamas.tˤaʕaʃ/	50 خمسين	/xamsiːn/	500 خمسميَّة	/xumsumijːa/
6 ستة	/sitːa/	16 ستطعش	/sit.tˤaʕaʃ/	60 ستين	/sitːiːn/	600 ستميَّة	/sutːumijːa/
7 سبعة	/sabʕa/	17 سبعطعش	/sabaʕ.tˤaʕaʃ/	70 سبعين	/sabʕiːn/	700 سبعميَّة	/subʕumijːa/
8 تمنية	/tamanja/ or /θamanja/	18 تمنطعش	/taman.tˤaʕaʃ/ or /θaman.tˤaʕaʃ/	80 تمانين	/tamaːniːn/ or /θamaːniːn/	800 تمنميَّة	/tumnumijːa/ or /θumnumijːa/
9 تسعة	/tisʕa/	19 تسعطعش	/tisaʕ.tˤaʕaʃ/	90 تسعين	/tisʕiːn/	900 تسعميَّة	/tusʕumijːa/
10 عشرة	/ʕaʃara/	20 عشرين	/ʕiʃriːn/	100 ميَّة	/mijːa/	1000 ألف	/alf/

A system similar to the German numbers system is used for other numbers between 20 and above: 21 is واحد و عشرين /waːħid u ʕiʃriːn/ which literally mean ('one and twenty') and 485 is أربعمية و خمسة و ثمانين /urbuʕmijːa u xamsa u tamaːniːn/ which literally mean ('four hundred and five and eighty').

Unlike Classical Arabic, the only number that is gender specific in Hejazi is "one" which has two forms واحد m. and وحدة f. as in كتاب واحد /kitaːb waːħid/ ('one book') or سيارة وحدة /sajːaːra waħda/ ('one car'), with كتاب being a masculine noun and سيّارة a feminine noun.

- for 2 as in 'two cars' 'two years' 'two houses' etc. the dual form is used instead of the number, with the suffix ēn /eːn/ or tēn /teːn/ (if the noun ends with a feminine /a/) as in كتابين /kitaːbeːn/ ('two books') or سيّارتين /sajːarateːn/ ('two cars'), for emphasis they can be said as كتابين اثنين or سيّارتين اثنين.
- for numbers 3 to 10 the noun following the number is in plural form as in أربعة كتب /arbaʕa kutub/ ('4 books') or عشرة سيّارات /ʕaʃara sajːaːraːt/ ('10 cars').
- for numbers 11 and above the noun following the number is in singular form as in:-
  - from 11 to 19 an ـر [ar] is added to the end of the numbers as in أربعطعشر كتاب /arbaʕtˤaʕʃar kitaːb/ ('14 books') or احدعشر سيّارة /iħdaʕʃar sajːaːra/ ('11 cars').
  - for 100s a [t] is added to the end of the numbers before the counted nouns as in ثلثميّة سيّارة /tultumijːat sajːaːra/ ('300 cars').
  - other numbers are simply added to the singular form of the noun واحد و عشرين كتاب /waːħid u ʕiʃriːn kitaːb/ ('21 books').

== Grammar ==
=== Subject pronouns ===
In Hejazi Arabic, personal pronouns have eight forms. In singular, the 2nd and 3rd persons differentiate gender, while the 1st person and plural do not. The negative articles include لا /laː/ as in لا تكتب /laː tiktub/ ('do not write!'), ما /maː/ as in ما بيتكلم /maː bijitkalːam/ ('he is not talking') and مو /muː/ as in مو كذا /muː kida/ ('not like this')

Subject pronouns
Person		Singular	Plural
1st		ana انا	iħna / niħna نحنَ / احنا
2nd	masculine	inta َانت	intu انتو
2nd	feminine	inti ِانتي/انت	intu انتو
3rd	masculine	huwwa َّهُو	humma هُمَّ
3rd	feminine	hiyya َّهِي	humma هُمَّ

Negative subject pronouns
Person		Singular	Plural
1st		mani ماني/مني	maħna محنا
2nd	masculine	manta َمنت	mantu منتو
2nd	feminine	manti منتي	mantu منتو
3rd	masculine	mahu مهو	mahum ماهم/مهم
3rd	feminine	mahi مهي	mahum ماهم/مهم

=== Verbs ===
Hejazi Arabic verbs, as with the verbs in other Semitic languages, and the entire vocabulary in those languages, are based on a set of three, four, or even five consonants (but mainly three consonants) called a root (triliteral or quadriliteral according to the number of consonants). The root communicates the basic meaning of the verb, e.g. k-t-b 'to write', ʼ-k-l 'to eat'. Changes to the vowels in between the consonants, along with prefixes or suffixes, specify grammatical functions such as :

- Two tenses (past, present; present progressive is indicated by the prefix (bi-), future is indicated by the prefix (ħa-))
- Two voices (active, passive)
- Two genders (masculine, feminine)
- Three persons (first, second, third)
- Two numbers (singular, plural)

Hejazi has two grammatical number in verbs (Singular and Plural) instead of the Classical (Singular, Dual and Plural), in addition to a present progressive tense which was not part of the Classical Arabic grammar. In contrast to other urban dialects the prefix (b-) is used only for present continuous as in بِيِكْتُب /bijiktub/ "he is writing" while the habitual tense is without a prefix as in أَحُبِّك /ʔaħubbik/ "I love you" f. unlike بحبِّك in Egyptian and Levantine dialects and the future tense is indicated by the prefix (ħa-) as in حَنِجْري /ħanid͡ʒri/ "we will run".

==== Regular verbs ====
The most common verbs in Hejazi have a given vowel pattern for past (a and i) to present (a or u or i). Combinations of each exist:

Vowel patterns		Example
Past	Present	Example
a	a	raħam رحم he forgave – yirħam يرحم he forgives
a	u	ḍarab ضرب he hit – yiḍrub يضرب he hits
a	i	ġasal غسل he washed – yiġsil يغسل he washes
i	a	fihim فهم he understood – yifham يفهم he understands
i	i	ʕirif عرف he knew – yiʕrif يعرف he knows

According to Arab grammarians, verbs are divided into three categories; Past ماضي, Present مضارع and Imperative أمر. An example from the root k-t-b the verb katabt/ʼaktub 'i wrote/i write' (which is a regular sound verb):

Verb Example (ك ت ب) (k t b) "to write"
Tense/Mood		Past "wrote"		Present (Indicative) "write"		Imperative "write!"	
Person		Singular	Plural	Singular	Plural	Singular	Plural
1st		كتبت (katab)-t	كتبنا (katab)-na	أكتب ʼa-(ktub)	نكتب ni-(ktub)		
2nd	masculine	كتبت (katab)-t	كتبتوا (katab)-tu	تكتب ti-(ktub)	تكتبوا ti-(ktub)-u	أكتب [a]-(ktub)	أكتبوا [a]-(ktub)-u
2nd	feminine	كتبتي (katab)-ti	كتبتوا (katab)-tu	تكتبي ti-(ktub)-i	تكتبوا ti-(ktub)-u	أكتبي [a]-(ktub)-i	أكتبوا [a]-(ktub)-u
3rd	masculine	كتب (katab)	كتبوا (katab)-u	يكتب yi-(ktub)	يكتبوا yi-(ktub)-u		
3rd	feminine	كتبت (katab)-at	كتبوا (katab)-u	تكتب ti-(ktub)	يكتبوا yi-(ktub)-u		

While present progressive and future are indicated by adding the prefix (b-) and (ħa-) respectively to the present (indicative) :

Tense/Mood		Present Progressive "writing"		Future "will write"	
Person		Singular	Plural	Singular	Plural
1st		بكتب or بأكتب ba-a-(ktub)	بنكتب bi-ni-(ktub)	حكتب or حأكتب ħa-a-(ktub)	حنكتب ħa-ni-(ktub)
2nd	masculine	بتكتب bi-ti-(ktub)	بتكتبوا bi-ti-(ktub)-u	حتكتب ħa-ti-(ktub)	حتكتبوا ħa-ti-(ktub)-u
2nd	feminine	بتكتبي bi-ti-(ktub)-i	بتكتبوا bi-ti-(ktub)-u	حتكتبي ħa-ti-(ktub)-i	حتكتبوا ħa-ti-(ktub)-u
3rd	masculine	بيكتب bi-yi-(ktub)	بيكتبوا bi-yi-(ktub)-u	حيكتب ħa-yi-(ktub)	حيكتبوا ħa-yi-(ktub)-u
3rd	feminine	بتكتب bi-ti-(ktub)	بيكتبوا bi-yi-(ktub)-u	حتكتب ħa-ti-(ktub)	حيكتبوا ħa-yi-(ktub)-u

  - The verbs highlighted in silver sometimes come in irregular forms e.g. حبيت (ħabbē)-t "i loved", حبينا (ħabbē)-na "we loved" but ّحب (ħabb) "he loved" and حبُّوا (ħabb)-u "they loved".
  - additional final ا to ـوا /-u/ in all plural verbs is silent.
- The Active Participles قاعد /gaːʕid/, قاعدة /gaːʕda/ and قاعدين /gaːʕdiːn/ can be used instead of the prefix بـ [b-] as in قاعد اكتب /gaːʕid aktub/ ('i'm writing') instead of بأكتب /baʔaktub/ or بكتب /baktub/ ('i'm writing') without any change in the meaning. The active participles جالس /d͡ʒaːlis/, جالسة /d͡ʒaːlsa/ and جالسين /d͡ʒaːlsiːn/ are used in the same way.
- The past tenses of the verbs قعد /gaʕad/ ('he sat/remained') or جلس /d͡ʒalas/ ('he sat') can be used before present verbs to express a past continuous tense which is similar to the English usage of "kept" as in قعد يكتب عنه /gaʕad jiktub ʕanːu/ ('he kept writing about him').
- A way of emphasizing the past tense is by adding the verbs قام /gaːm/ ('he stood') or راح /raːħ/ ('went') and its derivatives before the past verbs which is similar to the English usage of "went", as in قام جري له /gaːm d͡ʒiriːlu/ ('he went and ran to him') and راح كتب عنه /raːħ katab ʕanːu/ ('he went and wrote about him').
- the 3rd person past plural suffix -/u/ turns into -/oː/ (long o) instead of -/uː/ before pronouns, as in راحوا /raːħu/ ('they went') → راحوا له /raːħoːlu/ ('they went to him'), or it can be originally an -/oː/ as in جوا /d͡ʒoː/ ('they came') and in its homophone جوه /d͡ʒoː/ ('they came to him') since the word-final 3rd person masculine singular pronoun ـه is silent.
- word-final hollow verbs have a unique conjugation of either /iːt/ or /eːt/, if a verb ends in ـي /i/ in its past simple form as in نسي nisi 'he forgot' (present ينسى yinsa 'he forgets') it becomes نسيت nisīt 'I forgot' and نسيت nisyat 'she forgot' and نِسْيوا nisyu 'they forgot'. While if the verb ends in ـى or ـا /a/ in its past simple form as in شوى šawa 'he grilled' (present يشوي yišwi 'he grills') it becomes شَويت šawēt 'I grilled' and شَوَت šawat 'she grilled and شَووا šawu 'they grilled'. Most of these verbs correspond to their Classical Arabic forms like رضي, دعا, صحي, لقي, and سقى but some exceptions include بكي biki 'he cried', جري jiri 'he ran', مشي miši 'he walked' and دري diri 'he knew' as opposed to the Classical بكى baka, جرى jara, مشى maša, درى dara.

Example: katabt/aktub "write": non-finite forms

Number/Gender	اسم الفاعل Active Participle	اسم المفعول Passive Participle	مصدر Verbal Noun
Masc. Sg.	kātib كاتب	maktūb مكتوب	kitāba كتابة
Fem. Sg.	kātb-a كاتبة	maktūb-a مكتوبة	kitāba كتابة
Pl.	kātb-īn كاتبين	maktūb-īn مكتوبين	kitāba كتابة

Active participles act as adjectives, and so they must agree with their subject. An active participle can be used in several ways:

1. to describe a state of being (understanding; knowing).
2. to describe what someone is doing right now (going, leaving) as in some verbs like رحت ("i went") the active participle رايح ("i'm going") is used instead of present continuous form to give the same meaning of an ongoing action.
3. to indicate that someone/something is in a state of having done something (having put something somewhere, having lived somewhere for a period of time).

==== Passive Voice ====
The passive voice is expressed through two patterns; (اَنْفَعَل /anfaʕal/, يِنْفَعِل /jinfaʕil/) or (اَتْفَعَل /atfaʕal/, يِتْفَعِل /jitfaʕil/), while most verbs can take either pattern as in أتكتب /atkatab/ or أنكتب /ankatab/ "it was written" and يتكتب /jitkatib/ or ينكتب /jinkatib/ "it is being written", other verbs can only have one of the two patterns as in اتوقف /atwagːaf/ "he was stopped" and يتوقف /jitwagːaf/ "he is being stopped".

=== Adjectives ===
In Hejazi, adjectives, demonstratives and verbs fully agree in gender and number, e.g. ولد كبير /walad kabiːr/ "big boy" and بنت كبيرة /bint kabiːra/ "big girl". But there are two exceptions; First, there is no agreement in dual number; e.g. بنتين /binteːn/ "two girls" takes the plural adjective as in بنتين كبار /binteːn kubaːr/ "two big girls". Second, and more importantly, gender agreement is syncretic in the plural, in which inanimate plural nouns take a feminine singular adjective e.g. سيارات كبيرة /sajːaːraːt kabiːra/ "big cars" instead of the plural adjective, while animate plural nouns take the plural adjective as in بنات كبار /banaːt kubaːr/ "big girls". The plural feminine adjective كبيرات /kabiːraːt/ can be used as well but it is rather archaic.

Adjective Example "big"
Number/Gender	Adjective	Usage notes
Masc. Sg.	kabīr كبير	with singular masculine nouns
Fem. Sg.	kabīra كبيرة	with singular feminine and inanimate plural nouns
Common Pl.	kubār كبار or kabīrīn كبيرين	with dual (masculine or feminine) and animate plural (masculine or feminine) nouns

=== Pronouns ===
==== Enclitic pronouns ====
Enclitic forms of personal pronouns are suffixes that are affixed to various parts of speech, with varying meanings:

- To the construct state of nouns, where they have the meaning of possessive demonstratives, e.g. "my, your, his".
- To verbs, where they have the meaning of direct object pronouns, e.g. "me, you, him".
- To verbs, where they have the meaning of indirect object pronouns, e.g. "(to/for) me,(to/for) you, (to/for) him".
- To prepositions.

Unlike Egyptian Arabic, in Hejazi no more than one pronoun can be suffixed to a word.

Possessive Pronouns (nominal)
Person		Singular		Plural
1st		consonant+	vowel+	Plural
1st		-i ـي	-yya or -ya ـيّ^{1}	-na ـنا
2nd	masculine m.	-ak ـَك	-k ـك	-kum ـكم
2nd	feminine f.	-ik ـِك	-ki ـكي	-kum ـكم
3rd	masculine m.	-u ـُه	-[ː] ـه^{2}	-hum ـهم
3rd	feminine f.	-ha ـها		-hum ـهم

Direct Object Pronouns (verbal)
Person		Singular		Plural
1st		consonant+	vowel+	Plural
1st		-ni ـني		-na ـنا
2nd	masculine m.	-ak ـَك	-k ـك	-kum ـكم
2nd	feminine f.	-ik ـِك	-ki ـكي	-kum ـكم
3rd	masculine m.	-u ـُه	-[ː] ـه^{2}	-hum ـهم
3rd	feminine f.	-ha ـها		-hum ـهم

Indirect Object Pronouns (verbal)
Person		Singular	Plural
1st		-li لي	-lana لنا
2nd	masculine m.	-lak لَك	-lakum لكم
2nd	feminine f.	-lik لِك	-lakum لكم
3rd	masculine m.	-lu له	-lahum لهم
3rd	feminine f.	-laha لها	-lahum لهم

- ^1 if a noun ends with a vowel (other than the /-a/ of the feminine nouns) that is /u/ or /a/ then the suffix (-ya) is used as in أبو /abu/ ('father') becomes أبويَ /abuːja/ ('my father') but if it ends with an /i/ then the suffix (-yya) is added as in كُرْسِيَّ /kursijːa/ ('my chair') from كُرْسِي /kursi/ ('chair').
- ^2 the colon between the parentheses -[ː] indicates that the final vowel of a word is lengthened as in كرسي /kursi/ ('chair') → كرسيه /kursiː/ ('his chair'), since the word-final ـه [h] is silent in this position. although in general it is uncommon for Hejazi nouns to end in a vowel other than the /-a/ of the feminine nouns.
- The indirect object pronouns are written separately from the verbs as per Classical Arabic convention, but they are pronounced as if they are fused with the verbs. They are still written separately by many writers as in كتبت له /katabtalːu/ ('i wrote to him') but they can be written intact كتبتله since Hejazi does not have a written standard.

General Modifications:-

- When a noun ends in a feminine /a/ vowel as in مدرسة /madrasa/ ('school') : a /t/ is added before the suffixes as in → مدرستي /madrasati/ ('my school'), مدرسته /madrasatu/ ('his school'), مدرستها /madrasatha/ ('her school') and so on.
- After a word ends in a vowel (other than the /-a/ of the feminine nouns), the vowel is lengthened, and the pronouns in (vowel+) are used instead of their original counterparts :-
  - as in the noun كرسي /kursi/ ('chair') → كرسيه /kursiː/ ('his chair'), كرسينا /kursiːna/ ('our chair'), كرسيكي /kursiːki/ ('your chair' f.) and the verb لاحقنا /laːħagna/ ('we followed') → لاحقناه /laːħagnaː/ ('we followed him'), لاحقناكي /laːħagnaːki/ ('we followed you' feminine).
  - the indirect object pronouns رحنا /ruħna/ ('we went') → رحنا له /ruħnaːlu/ ('we went to him').
- After a word that ends in two consonants, or which has a long vowel in the last syllable, /-a-/ is inserted before the 5 suffixes which begin with a consonant /-ni/, /-na/, /-ha/, /-hom/, /-kom/.
  - as in the noun كتاب /kitaːb/ ('book') → كتابها /kitaːbaha/ ('her book'), كتابهم /kitaːbahum/ ('their book'), كتابكم /kitaːbakum/ ('your book' plural), كتابنا /kitaːbana/ ('our book') or the verb عرفت /ʕirift/ ('you knew') → عرفتني /ʕiriftani/ ('you knew me'), عرفتنا /ʕiriftana/ ('you knew us'), عرفتها /ʕiriftaha/ ('you knew her'), عرفتهم /ʕiriftahum/ ('you knew them').
  - When a verb ends in two consonants as in رحت /ruħt/ ('i went' or 'you went') : an /-al-/ is added before the Indirect object pronoun suffixes → رحت له /ruħtalːu/ ('i went to him') or in كتبت /katabt/ ('I wrote' or 'you wrote') becomes كتبت له /katabtalːu/ ('i wrote to him'), كتبت لهم /katabtalːahum/ ('i wrote to them').
- the 3rd person past plural suffix -/u/ turns into -/oː/ (long o) before pronouns, as in عرفوا /ʕirfu/ ('they knew') → عرفوني /ʕirfoːni/ ('they knew me'), راحوا /raːħu/ ('they went') → راحوا له /raːħoːlu/ ('they went to him') or كتبوا /katabu/ ('they wrote') → كتبوا لي /kataboːli/ ('they wrote to me')

==== Hollow Verbs vowel shortening ====
Medial vowel shortening occurs in Hollow verbs (verbs with medial vowels ā, ū, ō, ē, ī) when added to Indirect object pronouns:

Hollow Verb (ر و ح) (r w ḥ) "to go"
Tense/Mood		Past "went" (ruḥ)		Present (Indicative) "goes" (rūḥ)		Imperative "go!" (rūḥ)	
Person		Singular	Plural	Singular	Plural	Singular	Plural
1st		رحت ruḥt	رحنا ruḥna	أروح ʼarūḥ	نروح nirūḥ		
2nd	masculine	رحت ruḥt	رحتوا ruḥtu	تروح tirūḥ	تروحوا tirūḥu	روح rūḥ	روحوا rūḥu
2nd	feminine	رحتي ruḥti	رحتوا ruḥtu	تروحي tirūḥi	تروحوا tirūḥu	روحي rūḥi	روحوا rūḥu
3rd	masculine	راح rāḥ	راحوا rāḥu	يروح yirūḥ	يروحوا yirūḥu		
3rd	feminine	راحت rāḥat	راحوا rāḥu	تروح tirūḥ	يروحوا yirūḥu		

- when a verb has a long vowel in the last syllable (shown in silver in the main example) as in أروح /aruːħ/ ('I go'), يروح /jiruːħ/ (he goes) or نروح /niruːħ/ (''we go'); the vowel is shortened before the suffixes as in أرُح له /aruħlu/ (I go to him), يرح له /jiruħlu/ (he goes to him) and نرُح له /niruħlu/ (we go to him) with the verbs resembling the Jussive (مجزوم majzūm) mood conjugation in Classical Arabic (shown in gold in the example), original forms as in أرُوح له or يروح له can be used depending on the writer but the vowels are still shortened in pronunciation.
- This does effect past verbs as well but the form of the word does not change, as in راح /raːħ/ rāḥ ('he went') which is pronounced راح له /raħlu/ ('he went to him!') after adding a pronoun.
- Other hollow verbs include أعيد /ʔaʕiːd/ ('I repeat') or قول /guːl/ ('say!') which become أعِيد لك / أعِد لك /ʔaʕidlak/ ('I repeat for you') and قُول لها / قُل لها /gulːaha/ ('tell her!')

Hollow Verb + Indirect Object Pronoun (-lu)
Tense/Mood		Past "went"		Present (Indicative) "goes"		Imperative "go!"	
Person		Singular	Plural	Singular	Plural	Singular	Plural
1st		رحت له ruḥt-allu	رحنا له ruḥnā-lu	أرح له or أروح له ʼaruḥ-lu	نرح له or نروح له niruḥ-lu		
2nd	masculine	رحت له ruḥt-allu	رحتوا له ruḥtū-lu	ترح له or تروح له tiruḥ-lu	تروحوا له tirūḥū-lu	رح له or روح له ruḥ-lu	روحوا له rūḥū-lu
2nd	feminine	رحتي له ruḥtī-lu	رحتوا له ruḥtū-lu	تروحي له tirūḥī-lu	تروحوا له tirūḥū-lu	روحي له rūḥī-lu	روحوا له rūḥū-lu
3rd	masculine	راح له raḥ-lu	راحوا له rāḥō-lu	يرح له or يروح له yiruḥ-lu	يروحوا له yirūḥū-lu		
3rd	feminine	راحت له rāḥat-lu	راحوا له rāḥō-lu	ترح له or تروح له tiruḥ-lu	يروحوا له yirūḥū-lu		

== Writing system ==
Hejazi does not have a standardized form of writing and mostly follows Classical Arabic rules of writing. The main difference between classical Arabic and Hejazi are the alternations of the Hamza, some verb forms and the final long vowels, this alternation happened since most word-final short vowels from the classical period have been omitted and most word-final unstressed long vowel have been shortened in Hejazi. Another alternation is writing the words according to the phoneme used while pronouncing them, rather than their etymology which mainly has an effect on the three letters ⟨ث⟩ ⟨ذ⟩ and ⟨ظ⟩, for example writing تخين /taxiːn/ "thick, fat" instead of ثخين or ديل /deːl/ "tail" instead of ذيل although this alternation in writing is not considered acceptable by many or most Hejazi speakers. The alphabet still uses the same set of letters as Classical Arabic in addition to two option letters ⟨پ⟩ /p/ and ⟨ڤ⟩ /v/ which are only used in writing loanwords and they can be substituted by ⟨ب⟩ /b/ and ⟨ف⟩ /f/ respectively depending on the writer, in addition to that the vowels /oː/ and /eː/ which were not part of the CA phonemic inventory are represented by the letters ⟨و⟩ and ⟨ي⟩ respectively.

Differences Between Classical and Hejazi writing

- Hamza ⟨ء⟩ /ʔ/:
  - Initial hamza holds little phonemic value in Hejazi but it can be used as per Classical Arabic convention, e.g. أزرق /ʔazrag/ "blue" or أخذ /ʔaxad/ "he took" can be written as ازرق or اخذ but long initial /aː/ is more important to indicate, e.g. آسف /ʔaːsif/ "sorry" to differentiate it from اَسَف / أَسَف /ʔasaf/ "regret".
  - Medial hamza is merged with the semi-vowels ⟨ي⟩ and ⟨و⟩ as in رايِح /raːjiħ/ "going" from رائِح /raːʔiħ/ and لولو /luːlu/ "pearl" from لؤلؤ /luʔluʔ/, or it can be completely elided as in جات /d͡ʒaːt/ "she came" from جاءت /d͡ʒaːʔat/ or جوا /d͡ʒoː/ "they came" from جاؤوا /d͡ʒaːʔuː/, but other words keep the medial hamza as in مسؤول /masʔuːl/ "responsible" and مسائل /masaːʔil/ "issues".
  - Final hamza is omitted in most Hejazi words as in غدا /ɣada/ "lunch" from غداء /ɣadaːʔ/, خضرا /xadˤra/ "green" from خضراء /xadˤraːʔ/, but some words keep the final hamza as in مُبْتَدئ /mubtadiʔ/ "beginner" and بطء /butˤʔ/ "slowness".
- Added medial long vowels /aː, uː, oː, iː, eː/:
  - some words have elongated medial vowels in Hejazi as in معاك /maʕaːk/ "with you" from مَعَكَ /maʕaka/, ليك /liːk/ "to you, for you" which could be from the classical َلَك /laka/ or إِلَيْك /ʔilajka/, and مين /miːn/ "who" from مَن /man/.
  - 2nd person masculine singular imperative in hollow verbs keep their long vowels as روح /ruːħ/ "go!" as opposed to classical رُح /ruħ/ and شوف /ʃuːf/ "see!" as opposed to classical شُف /ʃuf/.
- Final added ⟨ي⟩ /i/ appears in:
  - Masculine singular imperative in final-weak verbs, as in امشي /amʃi/ "go!, walk!" as opposed to classical امشِ /imʃi/. The classical pair امشي /imʃiː/ (feminine) and امش /imʃi/ (masculine) merged into امشي /amʃi/ used as a masculine and feminine singular imperative verb in Hejazi.
  - 2nd person feminine singular past verbs, as in نسيتي /nisiːti/ "you forgot" as opposed to classical نَسِيتِ /nasiːti/. The classical pair نَسِيتِ /nasiːti/ (feminine) and نَسِيتَ /nasiːta/ (masculine) became نسيتي /nisiːti/ (feminine) and نسيت /nisiːt/ (masculine).
  - Feminine possessive and object pronoun ـكي which occurs after a long vowel, as in يعطيكي /jiʕtˤiːki/ "he gives you" as opposed to classical يُعْطِيكِ /juʕtˤiːki/. The classical pair يُعْطِيكِ /juʕtˤiːki/ (feminine) and يُعْطِيكَ /juʕtˤiːka/ (masculine) became يعطيكي /jiʕtˤiːki/ (feminine) and يِعْطيك /jiʕtˤiːk/ (masculine).
  - Feminine pronouns, as in إنتي /inti/ "you", as opposed to classical أَنْتِ /anti/. The classical pair أنْتِ /anti/ (feminine) and أنْتَ /anta/ (masculine) became إنتي /inti/ (feminine) and إنت /inti/ (masculine), but the classical form can still be used in Hejazi.
- Innovative forms:
  - Some verb forms are innovative and differ from their classical equivalents as in the common plural verb شفتوا /ʃuftu/ "you saw" pl. as opposed to classical شُفْتُم /ʃuftum/ (masculine) and شُفْتُنَّ /ʃuftunna/ (feminine), or the final-weak verbs as in جِرْيوا /d͡ʒirju/ "they ran" as opposed to classical جَرَوْا /d͡ʒaraw/ and the doubled verbs حبّيت /ħabːeːt/ "I loved" opposed to classical حَبَبْتُ /ħababtu/.
  - The verb forms V, VI and IIQ have an additional initial ⟨ا⟩ before ⟨ت⟩ /t/, so that Hejazi forms اتْفَعَّل /atfaʕːal/, اتْفَاعَل /atfaːʕal/ and اتْفَعْلَق /atfaʕlag/ correspond to classical forms تَفَعَّل /tafaʕːal/, تَفَاعَل /tafaːʕal/ and تَفَعْلَق /tafaʕlaq/, e.g. اَتْكَلَّم /atkalːam/ "he spoke" (form V), اتْعامَلَت /atʕaːmalat/ "she worked" (form VI) and اتْفَلْسَفوا /atfalsafu/ "they babbled" (form IIQ).
  - Portmanteau words have the most alternatives in their spelling since they did not occur in Classical Arabic, so the word for "still" /lisːa/ can be written لِسَّا لِسَّة or لِسَّه depending on the writer, all of these forms stemming from the classical للساعة (/lisːaːʕa/, "to the hour").
  - Loanwords can have multiple spellings as well, which is the case for the word "also" /bardˤu/ which can be written as بَرْضُه or بَرْضو.

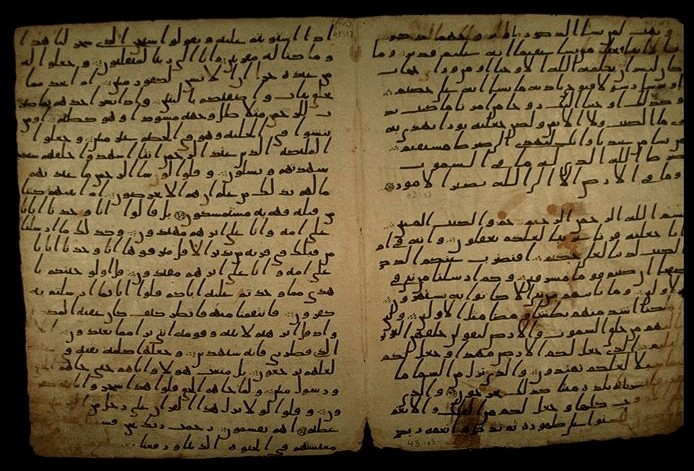
An Early Qur'anic manuscript written in Hejazi script (8th century AD)

Mistakes in Hejazi spelling

- Final silent ⟨ه⟩:
  - Writing ⟨و⟩ instead of final pronoun ⟨ه⟩ as in كتابه /kitaːbu/ "his book" which is mistakenly written كتابو.
  - Mixing final ⟨ه⟩ and ⟨ة⟩ as in فتحة /fatħa/ "opening" (/fatħat/ in construct state) and فتحه /fataħu/ "he opened it".
  - Missing the final ⟨ه⟩ masculine pronoun which often indicates a final long vowel as عَوَّرتي /ʕawːarti/ "you hurt" vs. عَوَّرتيه /ʕawːartiː/ "you hurt him", this can cause an ambiguity for the reader as in the homophones جا /d͡ʒaː/ "he came" and جاه /d͡ʒaː/ "he came to him" if both were written mistakenly as جا.
- Final /a/:
  - Mixing final ⟨ا⟩ and ⟨ى⟩ as in the word ترى /tara/ "by the way" which is mistakenly written ترا.
  - Mixing final ⟨ا⟩ and ⟨ة⟩ as in the word مَرَّة /marːa/ "time, once" which is mistakenly written مرا.
  - Adding a final ⟨ا⟩ to final 1st person singular possessive pronoun as in عَلَيَّ /ʕalajːa/ "on me" written mistakenly written as عَلَيَّا even though Classical Arabic have the same form and pronunciation as in عَلَيَّ /ʕalajːa/, other examples include مَعَايَ /maʕaːja/ "with me", لِيَّ /lijːa/ "to me", أبويَ /ʔabuːja/ "my father" and فِيَّ /fijːa/ "in me".
  - Missing final silent ⟨ا⟩ in plural verbs as in رَميتوا /ramiːtu/ "you threw" or عَلَّقوا /ʕalːagu/ "they hanged" even though this practice is no longer needed but it follows the Classical Arabic form.

The table below shows the Arabic alphabet letters and their corresponding phonemes in Hejazi:

Letter	Phonemes / Allophones (IPA)		Example	Pronunciation (IPA)
ا	/ʔ/ (see ⟨ء⟩ Hamza).		سَأَل "he asked"	/saʔal/
ا	/aː/		باب "door", جا "he came"	/baːb/, /ˈd͡ʒaː/
ا	/a/	when word-final and unstressed	شُفْنا "we saw"	/ˈʃufna/
ا	/a/	only when word-medial before indirect object pronouns e.g. لي, لها, له and some words	قال لي "he told me", راح لَها "he went to her"	/galːi/, /raħlaha/
ا	additional ∅ silent word-final only in plural verbs and after nunation		دِرْيُوا "they knew", شُكْرًا "thanks"	/dirju/, /ʃukran/
ب	/b/		بِسَّة "cat"	/bisːa/
ت	/t/		توت "berry"	/tuːt/
ث	/t/	or always / in some words as /θ/	ثَلْج "snow"	/tald͡ʒ/ or /θald͡ʒ/
ث	/s/	or always / in some words as /θ/	ثابِت "stable"	/saːbit/ or /θaːbit/
ج	/d͡ʒ/		جَوَّال "mobile phone"	/d͡ʒawːaːl/
ح	/ħ/		حوش "courtyard"	/ħoːʃ/
خ	/x/		خِرْقة "rag"	/xirga/
د	/d/		دولاب "closet"	/doːˈlaːb/
ذ	/d/	or always / in some words as /ð/	ذيل "tail"	/deːl/ or /ðeːl/
ذ	/z/	or always / in some words as /ð/	ذوق "taste"	/zoːg/ or /ðoːg/
ر	/r/		رَمِل "sand"	/ramil/
ز	/z/		زُحْليقة "slide"	/zuħleːga/
س	/s/		سَقْف "roof"	/sagf/
ش	/ʃ/		شيوَل "loader"	/ʃeːwal/
ص	/sˤ/		صُفِّيرة "whistle"	/sˤuˈfːeːra/
ض	/dˤ/		ضِرْس "molar"	/dˤirs/
ط	/tˤ/		طُرْقة "corridor"	/tˤurga/
ظ	/dˤ/	or always / in some words as /ðˤ/	ظِل "shade"	/dˤilː/ or /ðˤilː/
ظ	/zˤ/	or always / in some words as /ðˤ/	ظَرْف "envelope, case"	/zˤarf/ or /ðˤarf/
ع	/ʕ/		عين "eye"	/ʕeːn/
غ	/ɣ/		غُراب "crow"	/ɣuraːb/
ف	/f/		فَم "mouth"	/famː/
ق	/g/ (or [q] an allophone in some words)		قَلْب "heart", قِمَّة "peak"	/galb/, [gɪmːa] or [qɪmːa]
ك	/k/		كَلْب "dog"	/kalb/
ل	/l/ (or /ɫ/ a marginal phoneme only in the word الله and words derived from it)		ليش؟ "why?", الله "god"	/leːʃ/, /aɫːaːh/
م	/m/		مويَة "water"	/moːja/
ن	/n/		نَجَفة "chandelier"	/nad͡ʒafa/
هـ	/h/		هوا "air"	/hawa/
هـ	silent when word-final in 3rd person masculine pronouns and some words		كِتابُه "his book", شافوه "they saw him"	/kitaːbu/, /ʃaːˈfoː/
و	/w/		وَرْدة "rose"	/warda/
و	/uː/		فوق "wake up!", مو "is not"	/fuːg/, /ˈmuː/
و	/oː/		فوق "above, up", جوا "they came"	/foːg/, /ˈd͡ʒoː/
و	/u/	when word-final and unstressed	رَبو "asthma"	/ˈrabu/
و	/u/	only when word-medial before indirect object pronouns e.g. لي, لها, له	روح لها "go to her" also written as رُح لها	/ruħlaha/
ي	/j/		يَد "hand"	/jadː/
ي	/iː/		بيض "whites pl.", ذي f. "this"	/biːdˤ/, /ˈdiː/ or /ˈðiː/
ي	/eː/		بيض "eggs", عليه "on him"	/beːdˤ/, /ʕaˈleː/
ي	/i/	when word-final and unstressed	سُعُودي "saudi"	/suˈʕuːdi/
ي	/i/	only when word-medial before indirect object pronouns e.g. لي, لها, له	تجيب لي "you bring me" also written as تِجِب لي	/tid͡ʒibli/
Optional additional non-native letters
پ	/p/ usually written and pronounced as ⟨ب⟩ /b/, its usage depends on the writer		بيتزا or پيتزا "pizza"	/biːtza/ or /piːtza/
ڤ	/v/ usually written and pronounced as ⟨ف⟩ /f/, its usage depends on the writer		فَيْروس or ڤَيْروس "virus"	/fajruːs/ or /vajruːs/

Notes:

- The interdental consonants:
  - ⟨ث⟩ represents /t/ as in ثوب /toːb/ & ثواب /tawaːb/ or /s/ as in ثابت /saːbit/, but the phoneme /θ/ is still used depending on the speaker's preference.
  - ⟨ذ⟩ represents /d/ as in ذيل /deːl/ & ذكر /dakar/ or /z/ as in ذكي /zaki/, but the phoneme /ð/ is still used depending on the speaker's preference.
  - ⟨ظ⟩ represents /dˤ/ as in ظفر /dˤifir/ & ظل /dˤilː/ or /zˤ/ as in ظرف /zˤarf/, but the phoneme /ðˤ/ is still used depending on the speaker's preference.
- words with word-medial long vowels that are pronounced short include words before the indirect object pronouns e.g. لي, لها, له etc. as in عاد /ʕaːd/ "he repeated" becomes عاد لهم /ʕadlahum/ "he repeated to them" and رايحين له "going to him" becomes /raːjħinlu/ with a shortened /i/ or rarely /raːjħiːnlu/, outside of this rule only few words have vowel-shortening, e.g. جاي "I'm coming" pronounced /d͡ʒaj/ or less likely /d͡ʒaːj/ which stems from classical جاءٍ /d͡ʒaːʔin/.
- ⟨هـ⟩ /h/ is silent in word-final in 3rd person masculine singular pronouns and some words, as in شفناه /ʃufˈnaː/ "we saw him" and عِنْدُه /ʕindu/ "he has" or the heteronym ليه pronounced /leː/ 'why?' or /liː/ 'for him', but it is still maintained in most other nouns as in فَواكِه /fawaːkih/ "fruits", كُرْه /kurh/ "hate" and أَبْلَه /ʔablah/ "idiot" where it is differentiated from أبلة /ʔabla/ "f. teacher". In writing the final silent ⟨هـ⟩ indicates a word-final long vowel when preceded by a mater lectionis ⟨ا⟩, ⟨و⟩ and ⟨ي⟩. It helps in distinguishing minimal pairs as in تبغي /tibɣi/ 'you want f.' vs. تبغيه /tibɣiː/ 'you want him f.' (both sentences speaking to a female) or سيبوا /siːbu/ 'leave! pl.' vs. سيبوه /siːbuː/ 'leave him! pl.' (speaking to a plural), سيبوا is also a homophone of سيبه /siːbu/ 'leave him! m.' (speaking to a male).
- ⟨ة⟩ is only used at the end of words and mainly to mark feminine gender for nouns and adjectives with few exceptions (e.g. أسامة; a male noun). phonemically it is silent indicating final /-a/, except when in construct state it is a /t/, which leads to the word-final /-at/. e.g. رسالة /risaːla/ 'message' → رسالة أحمد /risaːlat ʔaħmad/ 'Ahmad's message'.
- ⟨غ⟩ /ɣ/ and ⟨ج⟩ /d͡ʒ/ are sometimes used to transcribe /g/ in foreign words. ⟨غ⟩ is especially used in city/state names as in بلغراد "Belgrade" pronounced /bilgraːd/ or /bilɣraːd/, this ambiguity arose due to Standard Arabic not having a letter that transcribes /g/ distinctively, which created doublets like كتلوق /kataˈloːg/ vs. كتلوج /kataˈloːd͡ʒ/ "catalog" and قالون /gaːˈloːn/ vs. جالون /d͡ʒaːˈloːn/ "gallon". newer terms are more likely to be transcribed using the native ⟨ق⟩ as in إنستقرام /instagraːm/ "Instagram" and قروب /g(u)ruːb, -uːp/ "group chat".
- ⟨ض⟩ /dˤ/ is pronounced /zˤ/ only in few words from the two trilateral roots ⟨ض ب ط⟩ and ⟨ض ر ط⟩, as in ضبط ("it worked") pronounced /zˤabatˤ/ and not /dˤabatˤ/.

== Rural dialects ==
The varieties of Arabic spoken in the smaller towns and by the bedouin tribes in the Hejaz region are relatively under-studied. However, the speech of some tribes shows much closer affinity to other bedouin dialects, particularly those of neighboring Najd, than to those of the urban Hejazi cities. The dialects of northern Hejazi tribes merge into those of Jordan and Sinai, while the dialects in the south merge with those of 'Asir and Najd. Also, not all speakers of these bedouin dialects are figuratively nomadic bedouins; some are simply sedentary sections that live in rural areas, and thus speak dialects similar to those of their bedouin neighbors.

=== Al-'Ula ===
The dialect of Al-'Ula governorate in the northern part of the Madinah region. Although understudied, it is considered to be unique among the Hejazi dialects, it is known for its pronunciation of Classical Arabic ⟨ك⟩ /k/ as a ⟨ش⟩ /ʃ/ (e.g. تكذب /takðib/ becomes تشذب /taʃðib/), the dialect also shows a tendency to pronounce long /aː/ as [eː] (e.g. Classical ماء /maːʔ/ becomes ميء [meːʔ]), in some instances the Classical /q/ becomes a /d͡ʒ/ as in قايلة /qaːjla/ becomes جايلة /d͡ʒaːjla/, also the second person singular feminine pronoun /ik/ tends to be pronounced as /iʃ/, e.g. رجلك /rid͡ʒlik/ ('your foot') becomes رجلش /rid͡ʒliʃ/.

=== Badr ===
The dialect of Badr governorate in the western part of the Madinah region is mainly noted for its lengthening of word-final syllables and its alternative pronunciation of some phonemes as in سؤال /suʔaːl/ which is pronounced as سعال /suʕaːl/, it also shares some features with the general urban dialect in which modern standard Arabic ثلاجة /θalːaːd͡ʒa/ is pronounced تلاجة /talːaːd͡ʒa/, another unique feature of the dialect is its similarity to the Arabic dialects of Bahrain.

== See also ==
- Varieties of Arabic
- Peninsular Arabic

== Bibliography ==
- Abdoh, Eman Mohammed (2010). A Study of the Phonological Structure and Representation of First Words in Arabic (PDF) (Thesis). Archived from the original (PDF) on 2018-11-01.
- Alzaidi, Muhammad Swaileh A. (2014). Information Structure and Intonation in Hijazi Arabic (PDF) (Thesis).
- Il-Hazmy, Alayan (1975). A critical and comparative study of the spoken dialect of the Harb tribe in Saudi Arabia (PDF).
- Ingham, Bruce (1971). "Some Characteristics of Meccan Speech". Bulletin of the School of Oriental and African Studies, University of London. 34 (2). School of Oriental and African Studies: 273–97. doi:10.1017/S0041977X00129544. ISSN 1474-0699. JSTOR 612692. S2CID 130531981.
- Kheshaifaty, Hamza M.J. (1997). "Numerals: a comparative study between classical and hijazi arabic" (PDF). Journal of King Saud University, Arts. 9 (1): 19–36. Archived from the original (PDF) on 2017-04-07.
- Omar, Margaret k. (1975). "Saudi Arabic, Urban Hijazi Dialect" (PDF).
- Kees Versteegh, The Arabic Language, NITLE Arab World Project, by the permission of Edinburgh University Press,
- Watson, Janet C. E. (2002). The Phonology and Morphology of Arabic (PDF). Archived from the original (PDF) on 2016-03-01.
