= Old Hijazi Arabic =

1-700 CE language variety or dialect

Old Ḥijāzī Arabic
- Qurayshi Arabic
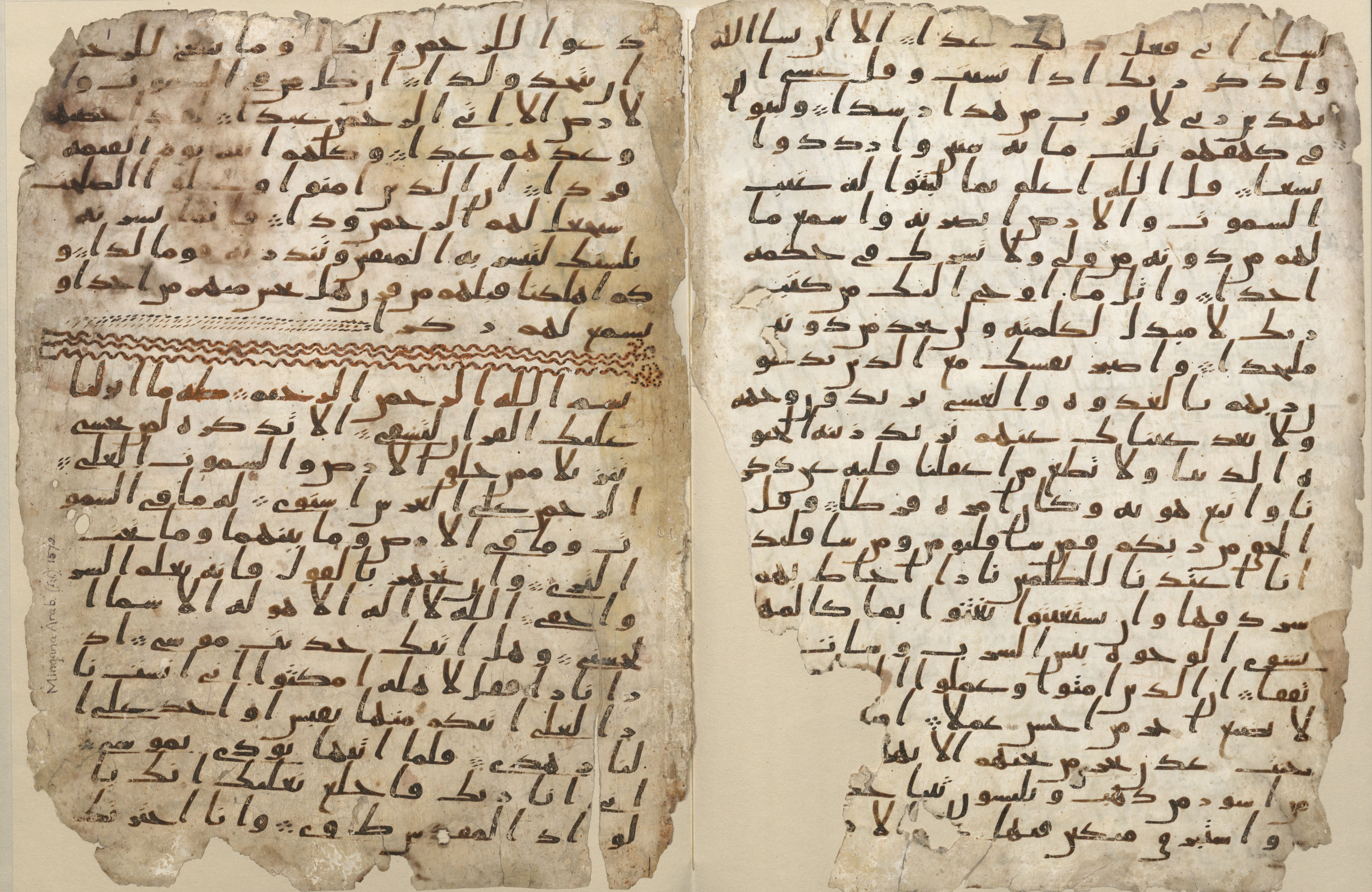
- Birmingham Quran manuscript
- Region: Hejaz (Saudi Arabia)
- Era: 1st century to 7th century
- Language family: Afroasiatic: Semitic; West Semitic; Central Semitic; North Arabian?; Arabic; Old Arabic; Old Ḥijāzī Arabic
- Writing system: Dadanitic, Arabic, Greek

Language codes
- ISO 639-3: None (mis)
- Glottolog: None

Old Hijazi or Old Hejazi is a variety of Old Arabic attested in the Hejaz region in present-day Saudi Arabia from about the 1st to the 7th century. It is the variety thought to underlie the Quranic Consonantal Text (QCT) and in its later iteration was the prestige spoken and written register of Arabic in the Umayyad Caliphate.

== Classification ==
Old Hijazi is characterized by the innovative relative pronoun ʾallaḏī (Arabic: ٱلَّذِي), ʾallatī (Arabic: ٱلَّتِي), etc., which is attested once in the inscription JSLih 384 and is the common form in the QCT, as opposed to the form ḏ- which is otherwise common to Old Arabic.

The infinitive verbal complement is replaced with a subordinating clause ʾan yafʿala ⟨أنْ يَفْعَلَ⟩, attested in the QCT and a fragmentary Dadanitic inscription.

The QCT along with the papyri of the first century after the Islamic conquests attest a form with an l-element between the demonstrative base and the distal particle, producing from the original proximal set ḏālika and tilka.

The emphatic interdental and lateral were realized as voiced, in contrast to Northern Old Arabic, where they were voiceless.

== Phonology ==
=== Consonants ===
Consonant phonemes of Old Hijazi
| | | Labial | Dental | Denti-alveolar | | Palatal | Velar | | Pharyngeal | Glottal |
| | | Labial | Dental | plain | emphatic | Palatal | plain | emphatic | Pharyngeal | Glottal |
|---|---|---|---|---|---|---|---|---|---|---|
| Nasal | | m | | n | | | | | | |
| Stop | voiceless | p ~ f ف | | t | tˤ | | k | kʼ ~ q ق | | ʔ^{1} |
| Stop | voiced | b | | d | | ɟ ~ g ~ gʲ ج | | | | |
| Fricative | voiceless | | θ | s | sˤ | ʃ | x | | ħ | h |
| Fricative | voiced | | ð | z | ðˤ | | ɣ | | ʕ | |
| Lateral | | | | | ɮˤ ~ d͡ɮˤ ض | | | | | |
| Flap / Trill | | | | r | | | | | | |
| Approximant | | | | l | | j | w | | | |

The sounds in the chart above are based on the constructed phonology of Proto-Semitic and the phonology of Modern Hejazi Arabic.

Notes:

1. The consonants ⟨ض⟩ and ⟨ظ⟩ were voiced, in contrast with Northern Old Arabic, where they may have been voiceless
2. The glottal stop /ʔ/ was lost in Old Hijazi, except after word-final [aː]. It is still retained in Modern Hejazi in few positions.
3. Historically, it is not well known in which stage of Arabic the shift from the Old Hijazi phonemes /p/, /g/, /q/ and /ɮˤ/ to Modern Hejazi /f/ ⟨ف⟩, /d͡ʒ/ ⟨ج⟩, /g/ ⟨ق⟩ and /dˤ/ ⟨ض⟩ occurred. However, the change in /g/ and /kʼ ~ q/ has been attested as early as the eighth century CE, and it can be explained by a chain shift / kʼ ~ q / → /g/ → /d͡ʒ/. (See Hejazi Arabic)

=== Vowels ===
Monophthong phonemes
| | Short | | Long | |
| | Front | Back | Front | Back |
|---|---|---|---|---|
| Close | i | u | iː | uː |
| Mid | (e) | | eː | oː |
| Open | a | | aː | |

In contrast to Classical Arabic, Old Hijazi had the phonemes [eː] and [oː], which arose from the contraction of Old Arabic [aja] and [awa], respectively. It also may have had short [e] from the reduction of [eː] in closed syllables:

The QCT attests a phenomenon of pausal final long -ī dropping, which was virtually obligatory.

Comparison with Classical Arabic
| | last shared ancestor | QCT (Old Hijazi) | | Classical Arabic |
|---|---|---|---|---|
| *-awv- | dáʿawa | دعا | dáʿā | dáʿā |
| *-awv- | sánawun | سنا | sánā | sánan |
| *-awv- | nájawatun | نجوه | najáwatu > najṓh | nájātun |
| *-awv- | nájawatu-ka | نجاتك | najawátu-ka > najātu-k | nájātu-ka |
| *-ajv- | hádaya | هدى | hádē | hádā |
| *-ajv- | fátayun | فتى | fátē | fátan |
| *-ajv- | túqayatun | تقىه | tuqáyatu > tuqḗh | túqātun |
| *-ajv- | túqayati-hu | تقاته | tuqayáti-hu > tuqāt́i-h | tuqāt́i-hi |

=== Example ===
Here is an example of reconstructed Old Hijazi side-by-side with its classicized form, with remarks on phonology:

| Old Hijazi (reconstructed) | Classicized (Hafs) |
|---|---|
| bism ʔallāh alraħmān alraħīm 1) ṭāhā 2) mā ʔanzalnā ʕalayk alqurān litašqē 3) ʔillā taðkirah liman yaxšē 4) tanzīlā mimman xalaq ʔalarɮˤ walsamāwāt alʕulē 5) alraħmān ʕalay ʔalʕarš ʔastawē 6) lah mā fī lsamāwāt wamā fī larɮˤ wamā beynahumā wamā taħt alṯarē 7) waïn taɟhar bilqawl faïnnah yaʕlam ʔalsirr waäxfē 8) ʔallāh lā ʔilāh ʔillā huww lah alasmāʔ ʔalħusnē 9) wahal ʔatēk ħadīθ mūsē 10) ið rāä nārā faqāl liählih amkuθū ʔinnī ʔānast nārā laʕallī ātīkum minhā biqabas aw aɟid ʕalay alnār hudē 11) falammā atēhā nūdī yāmūsē 12) innī anā rabbuk faäxlaʕ naʕleyk innak bilwād almuqaddas ṭuwē | bismi llāhi rraħmāni rraħīm 1) ṭāhā 2) mā ʔanzalnā ʕaleyka lqurʔāna litašqā 3) ʔillā taðkiratan liman yaxšā 4) tanzīlan mimman xalaqa lʾardˤa wassamāwāti lʕulā 5) ʾarraħmānu ʕalā lʕarši stawā 6) lahū mā fī ssamāwāti wamā fī lʾarḍˤi wamā beynahumā wamā taħta θarā 7) waʾin tajhar bilqawli faʔinnahū yaʕlamu ssirra waʔaxfā 8) ʾʔallāhu lā ʔilāha ʔillā huwa lahū lʔasmāʾu lħusnā 9) wahal ʾatāka ḥadīθu mūsā 10) ʾið raʔā nāran faqāla liʔahlih imkuθū ʔinnī ʔānastu nāran laʕallī ʔātīkum minhā biqabasin ʔaw ʔajidu ʔalā nnāri hudā 11) falammā ʔatāhā nūdiya yāmūsā 12) ʾinnī ʔana rabbuka faxlaʕ naʕleyka ʾinnaka bilwādi lmuqaddasi ṭuwā |

Notes:

- Basmala: final short vowels are lost in context, the /l/ is not assimilated in the definite article
- Line 2: the glottal stop is lost in /qurʾān/ (> /qurān), proto-Arabic */tišqaya/ collapses to /tašqē/
- Line 3: /taḏkirah/ < */taḏkirat/ < */taḏkirata/. The feminine ending was probably diptotic in Old Hijazi, and without nunation
- Line 4: /tanzīlā/ from loss of nunation and subsequent lengthening. Loss of glottal stop in /alarḍ/ has evidence in early scribal traditions and is supported by Warsh
- Line 5: Elision of the definite article's vowel in /lʿarš/ is supported by similar contextual elision in the Damascus psalm fragment. /astawē/ with fixed prothetic /a-/ is considered a hallmark of Old Hijazi, and numerous examples are found in the Damascus psalm fragment and support for it is found as well in Judeo-Christian Arabic texts. The word /ʿalay/ contains an uncollapsed final diphthong.
- Line 8: Old Hijazi may have had /huww/ < */huwwa/ < */hūwa/ < */hūʾa/ with an originally long vowel instead of /huwa/ < */huʾa/ as in Classical Arabic. This is supported by its spelling هو which indicates a consonantal /w/ rather than هوا had the word ended in a /ū/.
- Line 10: The orthography indicates /rāʾ/, from */rāʾa/ < */rāya/ < */raʾaya/

== Grammar ==
=== Proto-Arabic ===
Nominal inflection
| | Triptote | Diptote | Dual | Masculine Plural | Feminine Plural |
|---|---|---|---|---|---|
| Nominative | -un | -u | -āni | -ūna | -ātun |
| Accusative | -an | -a | -ayni | -īna | -ātin |
| Genitive | -in | -a | -ayni | -īna | -ātin |

Proto-Arabic nouns could take one of the five above declensions in their basic, unbound form.

==== Notes ====
The definite article spread areally among the Central Semitic languages and it would seem that Proto-Arabic lacked any overt marking of definiteness.

=== Old Hijazi (Quranic Consonantal Text) ===
Nominal inflection
| | Triptote | | Diptote | Dual | Masculine Plural | Feminine Plural |
|---|---|---|---|---|---|---|
| Nominative | -∅ | ʾal-...-∅ | -∅ | (ʾal-)...-ān | (ʾal-)...-ūn | (ʾal-)...-āt |
| Accusative | -ā | ʾal-...-∅ | -∅ | (ʾal-)...-ayn | (ʾal-)...-īn | (ʾal-)...-āt |
| Genitive | -∅ | ʾal-...-∅ | -∅ | (ʾal-)...-ayn | (ʾal-)...-īn | (ʾal-)...-āt |

The Qur'anic Consonantal Text presents a slightly different paradigm to the Safaitic, in which there is no case distinction with determined triptotes, but the indefinite accusative is marked with a final /ʾ/.

==== Notes ====
In JSLih 384, an early example of Old Hijazi, the Proto-Central Semitic /-t/ allomorph survives in bnt as opposed to /-ah/ < /-at/ in s^{1}lmh.

Old Hijazi is characterized by the innovative relative pronoun ʾallaḏī, ʾallatī, etc., which is attested once in JSLih 384 and is the common form in the QCT.

The infinitive verbal complement is replaced with a subordinating clause ʾan yafʿala, attested in the QCT and a fragmentary Dadanitic inscription.

The QCT along with the papyri of the first century after the Islamic conquests attest a form with an l-element between the demonstrative base and the distal particle, producing from the original proximal set ḏālika and tilka.

== Writing systems ==
=== Dadanitic ===
A single text, JSLih 384, composed in the Dadanitic script, from northwest Arabia, provides the only non-Nabataean example of Old Arabic from the Hejaz.

=== Transitional Nabataeo-Arabic ===
A growing corpus of texts carved in a script in between Classical Nabataean Aramaic and what is now called the Arabic script from Northwest Arabia provides further lexical and some morphological material for the later stages of Old Arabic in this region. The texts provide important insights as to the development of the Arabic script from its Nabataean forebear and are an important glimpse of the Old Ḥejāzī dialects.

=== Arabic (Quranic Consonantal Text and 1st c. Papyri) ===
The QCT represents an archaic form of Old Hijazi.

=== Greek (Damascus Psalm Fragment) ===
The Damascus Psalm Fragment in Greek script represents a later form of prestige spoken dialect in the Umayyad Empire that may have roots in Old Hijazi. It shares features with the QCT such as the non-assimilating /ʾal-/ article and the pronominal form /ḏālika/. However, it shows a phonological merger between [eː] and [aː] and the development of a new front allophone of [a(ː)] in non-emphatic contexts, perhaps realized [e(ː)].

== See also ==
- Arabic language
- Varieties of Arabic
- Hejazi Arabic
- Semitic languages
