= Abjad numerals =

Numeral system of the Arabic alphabet

The Abjad numerals, also called Hisab al-Jummal (Arabic: حِسَاب ٱلْجُمَّل, ḥisāb al-jummal), are a decimal alphabetic numeral system/alphanumeric code, in which the 28 letters of the Arabic alphabet are assigned numerical values. They have been used in the Arabic-speaking world since before the eighth century when positional Arabic numerals were adopted. In modern Arabic, the word ʾabjadīyah (أَبْجَدِيَّة) means 'alphabet' in general.

In the Abjad system, the first letter of the Arabic alphabet, ʾalif, is used to represent 1; the second letter, bāʾ, 2, up to 9. Letters then represent the first nine intervals of 10s and those of the 100s: yāʾ for 10, kāf for 20, qāf for 100, ending with 1000.

The word ʾabjad (أبجد) itself derives from the first four letters (A-B-G-D) of the Semitic alphabet, including the Aramaic alphabet, Hebrew alphabet, Phoenician alphabet, and other scripts for Semitic languages. These alphabets contained only 22 letters, stopping at taw, numerically equivalent to 400. The Arabic Abjad system continues at this point with letters not found in other alphabets: thāʾ = 500, khāʾ = 600, dhāl = 700, etc. Abjad numerals in Arabic are similar to the alphanumeric codes of Hebrew gematria and Greek isopsephy.

== Abjad order ==
The Abjad order of the Arabic alphabet has two slightly different variants. The Arabic abjad order is not a simple historical continuation of the earlier north Semitic alphabetic order, since it has a position corresponding to the Aramaic letter samekh / semkat ס, yet no letter of the Arabic alphabet historically derives from that letter.

In the most common Mashriqi abjad sequence, loss of samekh was compensated for by the split of shin ש into two independent Arabic letters, ش (shīn) and ﺱ (sīn), which moved up to take the place of samekh.

The Mashriqi (common) abjad sequence, read from right to left, is:

غ	ظ	ض	ذ	خ	ث	ت	ش	ر	ق	ص	ف	ع	س	ن	م	ل	ك	ي	ط	ح	ز	و	ه	د	ج	ب	ا
gh	ẓ	ḍ	dh	kh	th	t	sh	r	q	ṣ	f	ʿ	s	n	m	l	k	y	ṭ	ḥ	z	w/u	h	d	j	b	ʾ

This is commonly vocalized as follows:

- ʾabjad hawwaz ḥuṭṭī kalaman saʿfaṣ qarashat thakhadh ḍaẓagh.

Another vocalization is:

- ʾabujadin hawazin ḥuṭiya kalman saʿfaṣ qurishat thakhudh ḍaẓugh

In the Maghrebian abjad sequence (quoted in apparently earliest authorities and considered older), loss of samekh was compensated for by the split of tsade צ into two independent Arabic letters, ض (ḍad) and ص (ṣad), which moved up to take the place of samekh.

The Maghrebian abjad sequence, read from right to left, is:

ش	غ	ظ	ذ	خ	ث	ت	س	ر	ق	ض	ف	ع	ص	ن	م	ل	ك	ي	ط	ح	ز	و	ه	د	ج	ب	ا
sh	gh	ẓ	dh	kh	th	t	s	r	q	ḍ	f	ʿ	ṣ	n	m	l	k	y	ṭ	ḥ	z	w/u	h	d	j	b	ʾ

which can be vocalized as:

- ʾabujadin hawazin ḥuṭiya kalman ṣaʿfaḍ qurisat thakhudh ẓaghush

Another vocalization is:

- ʾabajd hawazin ḥuṭīyin kalamnin ṣaʿfaḍin qurisat thakhudh ẓughshin

Competing order

Modern dictionaries and other reference books use the newer hijāʾī (هجائي) / alifbāʾī (أَلِفْبَائِي) and more common order, which partially groups letters together by similarity of shape, and is never used as numerals.

The common hijāʾī sequence, read from right to left, is:

ي	و	ه	ن	م	ل	ك	ق	ف	غ	ع	ظ	ط	ض	ص	ش	س	ز	ر	ذ	د	خ	ح	ج	ث	ت	ب	ا
y	w/u	h	n	m	l	k	q	f	gh	ʿ	ẓ	ṭ	ḍ	ṣ	sh	s	z	r	dh	d	kh	ḥ	j	th	t	b	ʾ

Persian uses a slightly different order, in which و comes before ه instead of after it.

In the Maghrebian hijāʾī / alifbāʾī order (replaced by the Mashriqi order), the sequence is:

ي	و	ه	ش	س	ق	ف	غ	ع	ض	ص	ن	م	ل	ك	ظ	ط	ز	ر	ذ	د	خ	ح	ج	ث	ت	ب	ا
y	w/u	h	sh	s	q	f	gh	ʿ	ḍ	ṣ	n	m	l	k	ẓ	ṭ	z	r	dh	d	kh	ḥ	j	th	t	b	ʾ

In Abu Muhammad al-Hasan al-Hamdani's encyclopædia Kitāb al-Iklīl min akhbār al-Yaman wa-ansāb Ḥimyar (کتاب الإكليل من أخبار اليمن وأنساب حمير), the letter sequence (from right to left) is:

ي	ش	س	ه	ز	ر	ق	ف	ظ	ط	غ	ع	ض	ص	ن	و	م	ل	ك	ذ	د	خ	ح	ج	ث	ت	ب	ا
y	sh	s	h	z	r	q	f	ẓ	ṭ	gh	ʿ	ḍ	ṣ	n	w/u	m	l	k	dh	d	kh	ḥ	j	th	t	b	ʾ

== Uses of the Abjad system ==
Before the Hindu–Arabic numeral system, the abjad as numbers were used for all mathematical purposes. In modern Arabic, they are primarily used for numbering outlines, items in lists, and points of information. Equivalent to English, "A.", "B.", and "C." (or, rarer, Roman numerals: I, II, III, IV), in Arabic, thus "أ", then "ب", then "ج", not the first three letters of the modern hijāʼī order.

Like Roman numerals, there is no representation of zero and there are no fractions. By convention, the numbers are written largest first (larger to smaller, going right to left). Reversing the order indicates multiplication, so for example بغ is 2000 while غب is 1002. (Contrast this with Roman numerals, where reversing the order indicates subtraction, e.g. IV = 5 - 1 = 4.)

The abjad numbers are also used to assign numerical values to Arabic words for purposes of numerology. The common Islamic phrase بسم الله الرحمن الرحيم bismillāh al-Raḥmān al-Raḥīm ('In the name of Allah, the most merciful, the most compassionate' – see Basmala) has a numeric value of 786 (from a letter-by-letter cumulative value of 2+60+40+1+30+30+5+1+30+200+8+40+50+1+30+200+8+10+40). The name Allāh الله by itself has the value 66 (1+30+30+5).

== Letter values ==
In common abjad order:

Notice that some letters appear in their initial form and others in a riqaa-like form, with the alif having a different shape.

Value	Letter	Name	Trans- literation
1	ا	ʾalif	
2	ب	bāʾ	b
3	جـ	jīm	j
4	د	dāl	d
5	هـ	hāʾ	h
6	و	wāw	w / ū
7	ز	zāy/zayn	z
8	حـ	ḥāʾ	ḥ
9	ط	ṭāʾ	ṭ

Value	Letter	Name	Trans- literation
10	ى	yāʾ	y / ī
20	ك	kāf	k
30	ل	lām	l
40	مـ	mīm	m
50	ن	nūn	n
60	س	sīn	s
70	ع	ʿayn	ʿ
80	ف	fāʾ	f
90	ص	ṣād	ṣ

Value	Letter	Name	Trans- literation
100	ق	qāf	q
200	ر	rāʾ	r
300	ش	shīn	sh
400	ت	tāʾ	t
500	ث	thāʾ	th
600	خـ	khāʾ	kh
700	ذ	dhāl	dh
800	ض	ḍād	ḍ
900	ظ	ẓāʾ	ẓ
1000	غ	ghayn	gh

In Maghrebian Abjad order:

Value	Letter	Name	Trans- literation
1	ا	ʾalif	
2	ب	bāʾ	b
3	جـ	jīm	j
4	د	dāl	d
5	هـ	hāʾ	h
6	و	wāw	w / ū
7	ز	zāy/zayn	z
8	حـ	ḥāʾ	ḥ
9	ط	ṭāʾ	ṭ

Value	Letter	Name	Trans- literation
10	ى	yāʾ	y / ī
20	ک	kāf	k
30	ل	lām	l
40	مـ	mīm	m
50	ن	nūn	n
60	ص	ṣād	ṣ
70	ع	ʿayn	ʿ
80	ف	fāʾ	f
90	ض	ḍād	ḍ

Value	Letter	Name	Trans- literation
100	ق	qāf	q
200	ر	rāʾ	r
300	س	sīn	s
400	ت	tāʾ	t
500	ث	thāʾ	th
600	خـ	khāʾ	kh
700	ذ	dhāl	dh
800	ظ	ẓāʾ	ẓ
900	غ	ghayn	gh
1000	ش	shīn	sh

For four Persian letters these values are used:

Value	Letter	Name	Trans- literation	Has numerical value of
2	پ	pe	p	ب
3	چـ	che	ch or č	جـ
7	ژ	zhe	zh or ž	ز
20	گ	gâf	g	ک

== Similar systems ==
The Abjad numerals are equivalent to the earlier Hebrew numerals up to 400. The Hebrew numeral system is known as Gematria and is used in Kabbalistic texts and numerology. Like the Abjad order, it is used in modern times for numbering outlines and points of information, including the first six days of the week. The Greek numerals differ in a number of ways from the Abjad ones (for instance in the Greek alphabet there is no equivalent for ص, ṣād). The Greek language system of letters-as-numbers is called isopsephy. In modern times the old 27-letter alphabet of this system also continues to be used for numbering lists.

== See also ==
- Eastern Arabic numerals
- Western Arabic numerals
- Hurufism
- 'Ilm al-Huruf (science of letters)
- Gematria
- Unicode subscripts and superscripts
- Isopsephy
- Katapayadi system

== Sources ==
- Macdonald, Michael C. A. (1986). "ABCs and letter order in Ancient North Arabian". Proceedings of the Seminar for Arabian Studies (16): 101–168.
