= Ḏāl =

Arabic letter

← Ḫāʾ Ḏāl Ḍād →
- Arabic: ذ
- Phonemic representation: ð, (d, z)
- Position in alphabet: 25
- Numerical value: 700

Alphabetic derivatives of the Phoenician

Ḏāl ذال
- ذ

Usage
- Writing system: Arabic script
- Type: Abjad
- Language of origin: Arabic language
- Sound values: ð (standard); d, z (dialectal)
- Alphabetical position: 9

History
- Development: 𐤃: 𐡃; 𐢅; د; ذ

Other
- Writing direction: Right-to-left

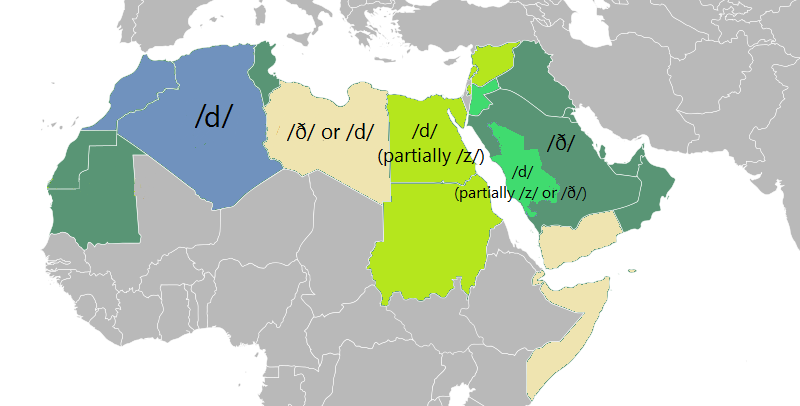
The main pronunciations of written ⟨ذ⟩ in Arabic dialects.

Ḏāl (ذ, also transcribed as dhāl) is one of the six letters the Arabic alphabet added to the twenty-two inherited from the Phoenician alphabet (the others being ṯāʾ, ḫāʾ, ḍād, ẓāʾ, ġayn). It is related to the Ancient North Arabian 𐪙, and South Arabian 𐩹.

In Modern Standard Arabic it represents /ð/. In name and shape, it is a variant of dāl (د). Its numerical value is 700 (see abjad numerals). The Arabic letter ذ is named ذَالْ ḏāl. It is written in several ways depending on its position in the word:

Position in word:	Isolated	Final	Medial	Initial
Glyph form: (Help)	ذ	ـذ	ـذ	ذ

The South Arabian alphabet retained a symbol for ḏ,.

When representing this sound in transliteration of Arabic into Hebrew, it is written as ד׳.

This sound is found in English, as in the words "those" or "then". In English the sound is sometimes rendered "dh" when transliterated from foreign languages, but when it occurs in English words it is one of the pronunciations occurring for the digraph "th". Azerbaijan is spelled with dhāl in Arabic script: أذربيجان.

In early forms of the New Persian language and a in practice followed by its writers, who used the letter dhal (ذ) in lieu of dal (د), in the middle of a word when the dal is preceded and followed by a vowel, or when dal was in the final position and preceded by a vowel, the letter was referred to as a dotted dhal or dal-i mu'ajjam (دال معجم).

== Pronunciations ==
Between and within contemporary varieties of Arabic, pronunciation of cognates with the letter ḏāl differs:

- The Gulf, Iraqi, Tunisian dialects use the Classical and Modern Standard sound of [ð].
- In Maghrebi Arabic, it is consistently pronounced as the voiced dental plosive [d̪].
- In Hejazi Arabic, it merges with /d/ or /z/ depending on the word or it is pronounced as /ð/.
- In the Mashriq (in the broad sense, including Egyptian, Sudanese and Levantine dialects), it becomes a sibilant voiced alveolar fricative [z]. Furthermore, in words fully assimilated into a Mashriq dialect, the sound has merged with /d/ (د).

Regardless of these regional differences, the pattern of the speaker's variety of Arabic frequently intrudes into otherwise Modern Standard speech; this is widely accepted, and is the norm when speaking the mesolect known alternatively as lugha wusṭā ("middling/compromise language") or ʿAmmiyyat/Dārijat al-Muṯaqqafīn ("Educated/Cultured Colloquial") used in the informal speech of educated Arabs of different countries (cf. Arabic dialect#Formal and vernacular differences).

Voiced sibilant Semitic consonants
Proto-Semitic		Old South Arabian	Old North Arabian	Modern South Arabian ^{1}	Standard Arabic		Aramaic		Modern Hebrew		Ge'ez		Phoenician		Akkadian
z	[z] / [dz]	𐩸	𐪘	/z/	ز	/z/	ז	z	ז	/z/	ዘ	z	𐤆	z	z
ḏ	[ð]	𐩹	𐪙	/ð/	ذ	/ð/	ז, later ד	*ḏ, z, later d	ז	/z/	ዘ	z	𐤆	z	z
Notes: 1. ṯ [θ], ḏ [ð] and ṯ̣ [θʼ] merge with [t], [d], and [tʼ] in Soqotri

== Unicode ==
Character information
Preview	ذ	
Unicode name	ARABIC LETTER DAL	
Encodings	decimal	hex
Unicode	1584	U+0630
UTF-8	216 176	D8 B0
Numeric character reference	&#1584;	&#x630;

== See also ==
- Arabic phonology
