= Ṯāʾ =

Arabic letter representing [θ]

← Taw Ṯāʾ Ḫāʾ →
- Arabic: ث
- Phonemic representation: θ (t, s)
- Position in alphabet: 23
- Numerical value: 500

Alphabetic derivatives of the Phoenician

Ṯāʾ ثاء
- ث

Usage
- Writing system: Arabic script
- Type: Abjad
- Language of origin: Arabic language
- Sound values: θ (standard); t, s (dialectal)
- Alphabetical position: 4

History
- Development: 𐤕: 𐡕; 𐢞; ٮ; ث

Other
- Writing direction: Right-to-left

Ṯāʾ (ث) is the fourth letter of the Arabic alphabet, one of the six letters not in the twenty-two akin to the Phoenician alphabet (the others being ḫāʾ, ḏāl, ḍād, ẓāʾ, ġayn). It is related to the Ancient North Arabian 𐪛, and South Arabian 𐩻.

In Modern Standard Arabic it represents the voiceless dental fricative [θ], also found in English as the "th" in words such as "thank" and "thin". In Persian, Urdu, and Kurdish it is pronounced as s as in "sister" in English. Ṯāʾ, along those with the letter shīn, are the only two surviving Arabic letters with three dots above. In most European languages, it is mostly romanized as the digraph th. In other languages, such as Indonesian, this Arabic letter is often romanized as ts and Ṡ.

The most common transliteration in English is "th", e.g. Ethiopia (إثيوبيا), thawb (ثوب).

In name and shape, it is a variant of tāʾ (ت). Its numerical value is 500 (see Abjad numerals).

The Arabic letter ث is named ثَاءْ ṯāʾ. It is written in several ways depending on its position in the word:

Position in word:	Isolated	Final	Medial	Initial
Glyph form: (Help)	ث	ـث	ـثـ	ثـ

In contemporary spoken Arabic, pronunciation of ṯāʾ as [θ] is found in the Arabian Peninsula, Iraqi, and Tunisian and other dialects and in highly educated pronunciations of Modern Standard and Classical Arabic. Pronunciation of the letter varies between and within the various varieties of Arabic: while it is consistently pronounced as the voiceless dental plosive [t] in Maghrebi Arabic (except Tunisian and eastern Libyan), on the other hand in the Arabic varieties of the Mashriq (in the broad sense, including Egyptian, Sudanese and Levantine) and Hejazi Arabic, it is pronounced as the sibilant voiceless alveolar fricative [s] in loanwords from Literary Arabic.

When representing this sound in transliteration of Arabic into Hebrew, it is written as ת׳.

== Common Semitic perspective ==
The choice of the letter tāʾ as the base for this letter was not due to etymology (see History of the Arabic alphabet), but rather due to phonetic similarity. For other Semitic cognates of the phoneme ṯ see Sound changes between Proto-Semitic and the daughter languages.

Ethiopia is the only country name in Arabic that uses the letter ṯāʾ in its name.

Voiceless consonants
Proto-Semitic		Old South Arabian	Old North Arabian	Modern South Arabian ^{1, 2}	Standard Arabic		Aramaic		Modern Hebrew		Ge'ez		Phoenician		Akkadian
s₃ (s)	[s] / [ts]	𐩯	𐪏	/s/	س	/s/	ס	s	ס	/s/	ሰ	s	𐤎	s	s
s₁ (š)	[ʃ] / [s]	𐩪	𐪊	/ʃ/, sometimes /h/	س	/s/	ש	š	שׁ	/ʃ/	ሰ	s	𐤔	š	š
ṯ	[θ]	𐩻	𐪛	/θ/	ث	/θ/	ש, later ת	*ṯ, š, later t	שׁ	/ʃ/	ሰ	s	𐤔	š	š
s₂ (ś)	[ɬ]	𐩦	𐪆	/ɬ/	ش	/ʃ/	ש, later ס	*ś, s	שׂ	/s/	ሠ	ś	𐤔	š	š
1. s₁ (š) is [ʃ], sometimes [h] and [j^{ɦ}] (in Soqotri) - [ʃ] and [ɕ^{w}] (for some speakers of Jibbali); 2. ṯ [θ], ḏ [ð] and ṯ̣ [θʼ] merge with [t], [d], and [tʼ] in Soqotri

== Character encodings ==
Character information
Preview	ث	
Unicode name	ARABIC LETTER THEH	
Encodings	decimal	hex
Unicode	1579	U+062B
UTF-8	216 171	D8 AB
Numeric character reference	&#1579;	&#x62B;

== See also ==
- Arabic phonology
