= Voiceless uvular plosive =

Consonantal sound represented by ⟨q⟩ in IPA

q
- IPA number: 111

Audio sample
- source · help

Encoding
- Entity (decimal): &#113;
- Unicode (hex): U+0071
- X-SAMPA: q
- Braille: ⠟ (braille pattern dots-12345)
Image

A voiceless uvular plosive or stop is a type of consonantal sound, used in some spoken languages. It is pronounced like a voiceless velar plosive [k], except that the tongue makes contact not on the soft palate but on the uvula. The symbol in the International Phonetic Alphabet that represents this sound is ⟨q⟩.

== Features ==
Sagittal section of a voiceless uvular plosive

Features of a voiceless uvular stop:

- Its manner of articulation is occlusive, which means it is produced by obstructing airflow in the vocal tract. Since the consonant is also oral, with no nasal outlet, it is a plosive.
- Its place of articulation is uvular, which means it is articulated with the back of the tongue (the dorsum) at the uvula.
- Its phonation is voiceless, which means it is produced without vibrations of the vocal cords. In some languages the vocal cords are actively separated, so it is always voiceless; in others the cords are lax, so that it may take on the voicing of adjacent sounds.
- It is an oral consonant, which means that air is not allowed to escape through the nose.
- It is a median consonant, which means it is produced by directing the airstream down the midline of the tongue, rather than to the sides.
- Its airstream mechanism is pulmonic, which means it is articulated by pushing air only with the intercostal muscles and abdominal muscles, as in most speech sounds.

== Occurrence ==
=== Uvular ===
Language		Word	IPA	Meaning	Notes
Abaza		хъацӀа/qac’a	[qat͡sʼa]	'man'	
Adyghe		атакъэ/atáqa	[ataːqa]	'rooster'	
Aleut		ԟи́гаԟъ/qiighax̂	[qiːɣaχ]	'grass'	
Arabic	Modern Standard	قـط/qiṭṭ	[qitˤː]	'cat'	See Arabic phonology
Arabic	Hejazi	قِـمَّة/qimma	[qɪmːa]	'peak'	Allophone of /g/. See Hejazi Arabic phonology
Arabic	Gulf	غـداً/qaden	[qədæn]	'tomorrow'	Corresponds to /ɣ/ in other dialects.
Arabic	Algerian	غـداً/qaden	[qədæn]	'tomorrow'	Corresponds to /ɣ/ in other dialects.
Assyrian		ܩܐ/qa	[qa]	'for'	Often realized as a tense /k/ rather than uvular /q/.
Archi		хъал/q"ál	[qaːl]	'human skin'	
Avá-Canoeiro		[ˈqɔːtõ]		'this'	Possible realisation of /k/. In the speech of people aged 40 to 80 years, the consonant is in free variation with [qˤ], [qʰ] and [k] in post-tonic or primarily or secondarily stressed syllables.
Bashkir		ҡаҙ/qađ	[qɑð]	'goose'	
Chechen		кхоъ/qo’	[qɔʔ]	'three'	
Chukchi		Нычымйыӄэн/nyčymjyḳèn	[nət͡ʃəmjəqen]	'bitter'	
Crimean Tatar		Къырым/Qırım	[qɯ.rɯm]	'Crimea'	
Dawsahak		[qoq]		'dry'	
English	Multicultural London	cut	[qʌt]	'cut'	Allophone of /k/ before non-high back vowels.
English	Non-local Dublin	back	[bɑq]	'back'	Allophone of /k/ after a retracted vowel for some speakers.
Eyak		g̣u:jih	[qʊːtʃɪ̤]	'wolf'	
German	Chemnitz dialect	rau	[qaɵ̯]	'rough'	In free variation with [ʁ̞], [ʁ], [ʁ̥] and [ʀ̥]. Does not occur in the coda.
Greenlandic		illoqarpoq	[iɬːoqɑppɔq]	'he has a house'	See Greenlandic phonology
Hebrew	Biblical	קול/qol	[qol]	'voice'	See Biblical Hebrew phonology
Hebrew	Mizrahi	קול/qol	[qol]	'voice'	See Mizrahi Hebrew
Hebrew	Shar'ab Temani	קול/qöl	[qøːl]	'voice'	See Yemenite Hebrew
Hmong	White Hmong	𖬆𖬰𖬦𖬵 / qub	[qu˦]	'old', 'ancient', 'outdated' or 'archaic'	
Hungarian		korom	[qorom]	'soot'	Possible allophone of ⟨/k/⟩ before back vowels. See Hungarian phonology
Hindustani	Hindi	बर्क़ / barq	[bərq]	'lightning'	Mostly in Hindi–Urdu loanwords from Arabic, pronounced mainly in Urdu and by educated Hindi speakers, with rural Hindi speakers often pronouncing it as a [k]. See Hindustani phonology
Hindustani	Urdu	بَرق / barq	[bərq]	'lightning'	Mostly in Hindi–Urdu loanwords from Arabic, pronounced mainly in Urdu and by educated Hindi speakers, with rural Hindi speakers often pronouncing it as a [k]. See Hindustani phonology
Ibaloi		kolpot		'cloud'	
Inuktitut		ᐃᐦᐃᑉᕆᐅᖅᑐᖅ/ihipqiuqtuq’	[ihipɢiuqtuq]	'explore'	See Inuit phonology
Iraqw		qeet	[qeːt]	'break'	
Kabardian		къэбэрдей/qabardey	[qabardej]	'Kabardian'	
Kabyle		ⵜⴰⵇⴲⴰⵢⵍⵉⵜ	[θɐqβæjlɪθ]	'Kabyle language'	May be voiced [ɢ].
Kabyle		taqbaylit	[θɐqβæjlɪθ]	'Kabyle language'	May be voiced [ɢ].
Kabyle		ثاقـبيليث	[θɐqβæjlɪθ]	'Kabyle language'	May be voiced [ɢ].
Kavalan		qaqa	[qaqa]	'elder brother'	
Kazakh		Қазақстан/Qazaqstan	[qɑzɑqˈstɑn]	'Kazakhstan'	An allophone of /k/ before back vowels
Ket		қан/qan	[qan]	'begin'	
Klallam		qəmtəm	[qəmtəm]	'iron'	
Kurdish	Sorani	قـوتابخانە/qutabxane	[qutɑbxɑnə]	'School'	An allophone of /k/ before back vowels
Kurdish	Kurmanji	Qalikdar	[qɑlɯkdɑr]	'crustacean'	An allophone of /k/ before back vowels
Kutenai		qaykiťwu	[qajkitʼwu]	'nine'	
Kyrgyz		Кыргызстан/Qırğızstan	[qɯrʁɯsˈstɑn]	'Kyrgyzstan'	An allophone of /k/ before back vowels
Lishan Didan	Urmi Dialect	אקלא/aqla	[aqlɑ]	'foot, leg'	
Maltese	Archaic Cottonera Dialect	qattus	[qɐˈtːuːs]	'cat'	
Malto		क़ान/qán	[qa:n]	'eye'	Corresponds to /x/ in other North Dravidian languages. See Malto language#Phonology.
Nez Perce		ʔaw̓líwaaʔinpqawtaca	[ʔawˀɪlwaːʔinpqawtat͡sa]	'I go to scoop him up in the fire'	
Nivkh		тяқр̆/täqŕ	[tʲaqr̥]	'three'	
Ossetian	Iron	Дзæуджыхъæу/Dzæwĝyqæw	[ˈd͡zæwd͡ʒəqæw]	'Vladikavkaz'	
Persian	Early New Persian	قَـاشُق/qaşuq	*/qaːʃuq/	'spoon'	May be allophonicly voiced to [ɢ] before a voiced stop. See Persian phonology.
Persian	Dari standard	قَـاشُق/qaşuq	[qɑːˈʃʊq]	'spoon'	May be allophonicly voiced to [ɢ] before a voiced stop. See Persian phonology.
Persian	Tajik standard	қошуқ/qoşuq	[qɔʃuq]	'spoon'	May be allophonicly voiced to [ɢ] before a voiced stop. See Persian phonology.
Persian	Some Iranian speakers	قـورباغه/qurbağe	[qurbɒɣe]	'frog'	In Western Iranian dialects, /q/ is realized as /ɢ/, converging with /ɣ/ into a single phoneme. Though some dialects in eastern Iran may still realize the distinction in some words. See Persian phonology.
Quechua		qallu	[qaʎu]	'tongue'	
Sahaptin		qu	[qu]	'heavy'	
Seediq		Seediq	[ˈseˈʔediq]	'Seediq'	
Seereer-Siin			—	—	
Shor		қам/qam	[qɑm]	'shaman'	
Somali		qaab	[qaːb]	'shape'	See Somali phonology
St’át’imcets		teq	[təq]	'to touch'	
Tlingit		g̱agw	[qɐ́kʷ]	'tree spine'	Tlingit contrasts six different uvular stops
Tatar		кайдан/qaydan	[qɑj.dɑn]	'from where?'	
Tsimshian		gwildmḵa̱p'a	[ɡʷildmqɑpʼa]	'tobacco'	
Turkmen		ak	[ɑ:q]	'white'	Allophone of /k/ next to back vowels
Ubykh		qhë	[qʰɜ]	'grave'	One of ten distinct uvular stop phonemes. See Ubykh phonology
Uyghur		ئاق/aq	[ɑq]	'white'	
Yup'ik		meq	[məq]	'fresh water'	
Yukaghir	Northern	маарх/márq	[maːrq]	'one'	
Yukaghir	Southern	атахл/ataql	[ataql]	'two'	
!Xóõ		ǀqháá	[ǀ͡qʰɑ́ː]	'to smooth'	

=== Pre-uvular ===
Voiceless post-velar or pre-uvular plosive

q᫈

k̠

Audio sample
- source · help

There is also a voiceless post-velar or pre-uvular plosive in some languages, which is more fronted compared to the prototypical uvular plosive, though further back than the prototypical velar plosive. The International Phonetic Alphabet does not have a separate symbol for that sound, though it can be transcribed as ⟨q̟⟩ or ⟨q᫈⟩ (both symbols denote an advanced ⟨q⟩) or ⟨k̠⟩ (a retracted ⟨k⟩).

Language		Word	IPA	Meaning	Notes
English	Australian	caught	[ḵʰoːt]	'caught'	Allophone of /k/ before /ʊ, oː, ɔ, oɪ, ʊə/. See Australian English phonology
Hopi		yaqa	[jäk̠ä]	'nose'	
Uzbek		qol	[q̟oɫ]	'arm'	Sometimes realized as an affricate [q͡χ˖].
Western Neo-Aramaic	Bakh'a				Pre-uvular, though in Ma'loula it is slightly more front (post-velar).
Western Neo-Aramaic	Ma'loula				Pre-uvular, though in Ma'loula it is slightly more front (post-velar).

== See also ==
- Guttural
- Index of phonetics articles
- Qoph
- Voiced uvular stop

== Notes ==
Place →	Labial					Coronal										Dorsal					Laryngeal			
Manner ↓	Bilabial		Labiodental		Linguolabial		Dental		Alveolar		Postalveolar		Retroflex		(Alveolo-)palatal		Velar		Uvular		Pharyngeal/epiglottal		Glottal	
Nasal	m̥	m	ɱ̊	ɱ		n̼	n̪̊	n̪	n̥	n	n̠̊	n̠	ɳ̊	ɳ	ɲ̊	ɲ	ŋ̊	ŋ	ɴ̥	ɴ				
Plosive	p	b	p̪	b̪	t̼	d̼	t̪	d̪	t	d			ʈ	ɖ	c	ɟ	k	ɡ	q	ɢ	ʡ		ʔ	
Sibilant affricate							t̪s̪	d̪z̪	ts	dz	t̠ʃ	d̠ʒ	tʂ	dʐ	tɕ	dʑ								
Non-sibilant affricate	pɸ	bβ	p̪f	b̪v			t̪θ	d̪ð	tɹ̝̊	dɹ̝	t̠ɹ̠̊˔	d̠ɹ̠˔			cç	ɟʝ	kx	ɡɣ	qχ	ɢʁ	ʡʜ	ʡʢ	ʔh	
Sibilant fricative							s̪	z̪	s	z	ʃ	ʒ	ʂ	ʐ	ɕ	ʑ								
Non-sibilant fricative	ɸ	β	f	v	θ̼	ð̼	θ	ð	θ̠	ð̠	ɹ̠̊˔	ɹ̠˔	ɻ̊˔	ɻ˔	ç	ʝ	x	ɣ	χ	ʁ	ħ	ʕ	h	ɦ
Approximant		β̞		ʋ				ð̞		ɹ		ɹ̠		ɻ		j		ɰ						˷
Tap/flap		ⱱ̟		ⱱ					ɾ̥	ɾ			ɽ̊	ɽ						ɢ̆		ʡ̆		
Trill	ʙ̥	ʙ							r̥	r		r̠	ɽ̊r̥	ɽr					ʀ̥	ʀ	ʜ	ʢ		
Lateral affricate									tɬ	dɮ			tꞎ	d𝼅	c𝼆	ɟʎ̝	k𝼄	ɡʟ̝						
Lateral fricative							ɬ̪		ɬ	ɮ			ꞎ	𝼅	𝼆	ʎ̝	𝼄	ʟ̝						
Lateral approximant								l̪	l̥	l		l̠	ɭ̊	ɭ	ʎ̥	ʎ	ʟ̥	ʟ		ʟ̠				
Lateral tap/flap									ɺ̥	ɺ			𝼈̊	𝼈		ʎ̆		ʟ̆						

		BL	LD	D	A	PA	RF	P	V	U
Implosive	Voiced	ɓ			ɗ		ᶑ	ʄ	ɠ	ʛ
Implosive	Voiceless	ɓ̥			ɗ̥		ᶑ̊	ʄ̊	ɠ̊	ʛ̥
Ejective	Stop	pʼ			tʼ		ʈʼ	cʼ	kʼ	qʼ
Ejective	Affricate		p̪fʼ	t̪θʼ	tsʼ	t̠ʃʼ	tʂʼ	tɕʼ	kxʼ	qχʼ
Ejective	Fricative	ɸʼ	fʼ	θʼ	sʼ	ʃʼ	ʂʼ	ɕʼ	xʼ	χʼ
Ejective	Lateral affricate				tɬʼ			c𝼆ʼ	k𝼄ʼ	q𝼄ʼ
Ejective	Lateral fricative				ɬʼ					
Click (top: velar; bottom: uvular)	Tenuis	kʘ qʘ		kǀ qǀ	kǃ qǃ		k𝼊 q𝼊	kǂ qǂ		
Click (top: velar; bottom: uvular)	Voiced	ɡʘ ɢʘ		ɡǀ ɢǀ	ɡǃ ɢǃ		ɡ𝼊 ɢ𝼊	ɡǂ ɢǂ		
Click (top: velar; bottom: uvular)	Nasal	ŋʘ ɴʘ		ŋǀ ɴǀ	ŋǃ ɴǃ		ŋ𝼊 ɴ𝼊	ŋǂ ɴǂ	ʞ	
Click (top: velar; bottom: uvular)	Tenuis lateral				kǁ qǁ					
Click (top: velar; bottom: uvular)	Voiced lateral				ɡǁ ɢǁ					
Click (top: velar; bottom: uvular)	Nasal lateral				ŋǁ ɴǁ					
