= Ghayn =

Nineteenth letter of the Arabic alphabet

← Ẓāʾ Ghayn
- Arabic: غ
- Phonemic representation: ɣ, ʁ
- Position in alphabet: 28
- Numerical value: 1000

Alphabetic derivatives of the Phoenician

ġayn غين
- غ

Usage
- Writing system: Arabic script
- Type: Abjad
- Language of origin: Arabic language
- Sound values: ɣ, ʁ
- Alphabetical position: 19

History
Development
V28
          - ع
            - غ

Other
- Writing direction: Right-to-left

The Arabic letter غ (Arabic: غَيْنْ, ghayn or ġayn, [ɣæjn]) (Note: Colloquially, it ranges from [ɣeːn] to [ɣiːn]. The consonant itself is [ʁ] in Arabia, Iraq, and North Africa, but not in the Nile valley or the Levant.) is one of the six letters the Arabic alphabet added to the twenty-two inherited from the Phoenician alphabet (the others being thāʼ, khāʼ, dhāl, ḍād, ẓāʼ). It represents the sound /ɣ/ or /ʁ/. In name and shape, it is a variant of ʻayn (ع). Its numerical value is 1000 (see Abjad numerals). In Persian, it represents [ɣ]~[ɢ] and is the twenty-second letter in the new Persian alphabet.

Ghayn is written in several ways depending on its position in the word:

Position in word:	Isolated	Final	Medial	Initial
Glyph form: (Help)	غ	ـغ	ـغـ	غـ

== History ==
Proto-Semitic ġ (usually reconstructed as voiced velar fricative /ɣ/ or voiced uvular fricative /ʁ/) merged with ʻayn in most Semitic languages except for Arabic, Ugaritic and older varieties of the Canaanite languages. The South Arabian alphabet retained a symbol for ġ, 𐩶. Biblical Hebrew, as of the 3rd century BCE, apparently still distinguished the phonemes ġ and ḫ /χ/, based on transcriptions in the Septuagint, such as that of the name "Gomorrah" as Gomorrha (Γόμορρᾰ) for the Hebrew ‘Ămōrā (עֲמֹרָה). Canaanite languages, including Hebrew, later also merged ġ with ʻayin, and the merger was complete in Tiberian Hebrew.

Proto-Semitic	Akkadian	Arabic		Canaanite	Hebrew		Aramaic		South Arabian	Geʻez	
ġ	–	غ	gh	ġ, ʻ	ע	ʻ	ע	ʻ	ġ	ዐ	ʻ

== Usage ==
The letter ghayn (غ) is preferred in the Levant (nowadays), and by Aljazeera TV channel, to represent /ɡ/, e.g., هونغ كونغ (Hong Kong), البرتغال (Portugal), أغسطس (August), and غاندالف (Gandalf). Foreign publications and TV channels in Arabic, e.g. Deutsche Welle, and Alhurra, follow this practice. It is then often pronounced /ɡ/, not /ɣ/, though in many cases, غ is pronounced in loanwords as expected (/ɣ/, not /ɡ/).

Other letters can be used to transcribe /ɡ/ in loanwords and names, depending on whether the local variety of Arabic in the country has the phoneme /ɡ/, and if it does, which letter represents it and whether it is customary in the country to use that letter to transcribe /ɡ/. For instance, in Egypt, where ج is pronounced as [ɡ] in all situations even in Modern Standard Arabic

Turkish ğ, which in modern speech has no sound of its own (similar to the soft g in Danish and the hard and the soft signs in Russian), used to be spelled as غ in the Ottoman script and pronounced as [ɣ]. Other Turkic languages also use this Latin equivalent of ghayn (ğ), such as Tatar (Cyrillic: г), which pronounces it as [ʁ], and Azerbaijani (Cyrillic: ғ, Perso-Arabic: غ), which pronounces it as [ɣ]. In Arabic words and names where there is an ayin, Tatar adds the ghayn instead (عبد الله, ʻAbd Allāh, ’Abdullah; Tatar: Ğabdulla, Габдулла; Yaña imlâ: غابدوللا /ʁabdulla/).

== Related characters ==
For related characters, see ng (Arabic letter) and ayin.

== Character encodings ==
Character information
Preview	غ		ﻍ		ﻎ		ﻏ		ﻐ	
Unicode name	ARABIC LETTER GHAIN		ARABIC LETTER GHAIN; ISOLATED FORM		ARABIC LETTER GHAIN; FINAL FORM		ARABIC LETTER GHAIN; INITIAL FORM		ARABIC LETTER GHAIN; MEDIAL FORM	
Encodings	decimal	hex	dec	hex	dec	hex	dec	hex	dec	hex
Unicode	1594	U+063A	65229	U+FECD	65230	U+FECE	65231	U+FECF	65232	U+FED0
UTF-8	216 186	D8 BA	239 187 141	EF BB 8D	239 187 142	EF BB 8E	239 187 143	EF BB 8F	239 187 144	EF BB 90
Numeric character reference	&#1594;	&#x63A;	&#65229;	&#xFECD;	&#65230;	&#xFECE;	&#65231;	&#xFECF;	&#65232;	&#xFED0;

Character information
Preview	ڠ		ݝ		ࢳ	
Unicode name	ARABIC LETTER AIN WITH THREE DOTS ABOVE		ARABIC LETTER AIN WITH TWO DOTS ABOVE		ARABIC LETTER AIN WITH THREE DOTS BELOW	
Encodings	decimal	hex	dec	hex	dec	hex
Unicode	1696	U+06A0	1885	U+075D	2227	U+08B3
UTF-8	218 160	DA A0	221 157	DD 9D	224 162 179	E0 A2 B3
Numeric character reference	&#1696;	&#x6A0;	&#1885;	&#x75D;	&#2227;	&#x8B3;

== See also ==
- Ng (Arabic letter)
- Arabic phonology
- Gaf
- Ayin
- Cyrillic Ghayn, used for several Central Asian languages
