= Ḫāʾ =

7th Arabic letter

← Ṯāʾ Ḫāʾ Ḏāl →
- Arabic: خ
- Geʽez: ኀ
- Phonemic representation: x, χ
- Position in alphabet: 24
- Numerical value: 600

Alphabetic derivatives of the Phoenician

Ḫāʾ خَاء
- خ

Usage
- Writing system: Arabic script
- Type: Abjad
- Language of origin: Arabic language
- Sound values: x, χ
- Alphabetical position: 7

History
- Development: 𐤇: 𐡇; 𐢊; ح; خ

Other
- Writing direction: Right-to-left

Ḫāʾ or Khāʼ (خ, transliterated as ḫ (DIN-31635), ḵ (Hans Wehr), kh (ALA-LC) or ẖ (ISO 233)) is one of the six letters the Arabic alphabet added to the twenty-two inherited from the Phoenician alphabet (the others being ṯāʼ, ḏāl, ḍād, ẓāʼ, ġayn). It is based on the ḥāʾ ح. It is related to the Ancient North Arabian 𐪍, South Arabian 𐩭, and Ge'ez ኀ.

It represents the sound [x] or [χ] in Modern Standard Arabic. The pronunciation of خ is very similar to German, Irish, and Polish unpalatalised "ch", Russian х (Cyrillic Kha), Greek χ and Peninsular Spanish and Southern Cone "j". In name and shape, it is a variant of ḥāʾ. South Semitic also kept the phoneme separate, and it appears as South Arabian, Ge'ez Ḫarm ኀ. Its numerical value is 600 (see Abjad numerals). In most European languages, it is mostly romanized as the digraph kh.

When representing this sound in transliteration of Arabic into Hebrew, it is written as ח׳.

The most common transliteration in English is "kh", e.g. Khartoum (الخرطوم al-Kharṭūm), Sheikh (شيخ).

Ḫāʾ is written is several ways depending on its position in the word:

Position in word:	Isolated	Final	Medial	Initial
Glyph form: (Help)	خ	ـخ	ـخـ	خـ

Ḫā has no derivatives.

== Character encodings ==
Character information
Preview	خ		ﺥ		ﺦ		ﺧ		ﺨ	
Unicode name	ARABIC LETTER KHAH		ARABIC LETTER KHAH; ISOLATED FORM		ARABIC LETTER KHAH; FINAL FORM		ARABIC LETTER KHAH; INITIAL FORM		ARABIC LETTER KHAH; MEDIAL FORM	
Encodings	decimal	hex	dec	hex	dec	hex	dec	hex	dec	hex
Unicode	1582	U+062E	65189	U+FEA5	65190	U+FEA6	65191	U+FEA7	65192	U+FEA8
UTF-8	216 174	D8 AE	239 186 165	EF BA A5	239 186 166	EF BA A6	239 186 167	EF BA A7	239 186 168	EF BA A8
Numeric character reference	&#1582;	&#x62E;	&#65189;	&#xFEA5;	&#65190;	&#xFEA6;	&#65191;	&#xFEA7;	&#65192;	&#xFEA8;

== See also ==
- Arabic phonology
