= Transaction cost =

Cost of making any trade

In economics, a transaction cost is a cost incurred when making an economic trade when participating in a market.

The idea that transactions form the basis of economic thinking was introduced by the institutional economist John R. Commons in 1931. Oliver E. Williamson's Transaction Cost Economics article, published in 2008, popularized the concept of transaction costs. Douglass C. North argues that institutions, understood as the set of rules in a society, are key in the determination of transaction costs. In this sense, institutions that facilitate low transaction costs can boost economic growth.

Alongside production costs, transaction costs are one of the most significant factors in business operation and management.

== Definition ==
Williamson defines transaction costs as a cost innate in running an economic system of companies, comprising the total costs of making a transaction, including the cost of planning, deciding, changing plans, resolving disputes, and after-sales. According to Williamson, the determinants of transaction costs are frequency, specificity, uncertainty, limited rationality, and opportunistic behavior.

Douglass North states that there are four factors that comprise transaction costs – "measurement", "enforcement", "ideological attitudes and perceptions", and "the size of the market". Measurement refers to the calculation of the value of all aspects of the good or service involved in the transaction. Enforcement can be defined as the need for an unbiased third party to ensure that neither party involved in the transaction reneges on their part of the deal. These first two factors appear in the concept of ideological attitudes and perceptions, North's third aspect of transaction costs. Ideological attitudes and perceptions encapsulate each individual's set of values, which influences their interpretation of the world. The final aspect of transaction costs, according to North, is market size, which affects the partiality or impartiality of transactions.

Dahlman categorized the content of transaction activities into three broad categories:

- Search and information costs are costs such as in determining that the required good is available on the market, which has the lowest price, etc.
- Bargaining and decision costs are the costs required to come to an acceptable agreement with the other party to the transaction, drawing up an appropriate contract and so on. In game theory this is analyzed for instance in the game of chicken. On asset markets and in organizational economics, the transaction cost is some function of the distance between the supply and demand.
- Policing and enforcement costs are the costs of making sure the other party sticks to the terms of the contract, and taking appropriate action, often through the legal system, if this turns out not to be the case.

Steven N. S. Cheung defines transaction costs as any costs that are not conceivable in a "Robinson Crusoe economy"—in other words, any costs that arise due to the existence of institutions. For Cheung, term "transaction costs" are better described as "institutional costs". Many economists, however, restrict this definition to exclude costs internal to an organization.

== History ==
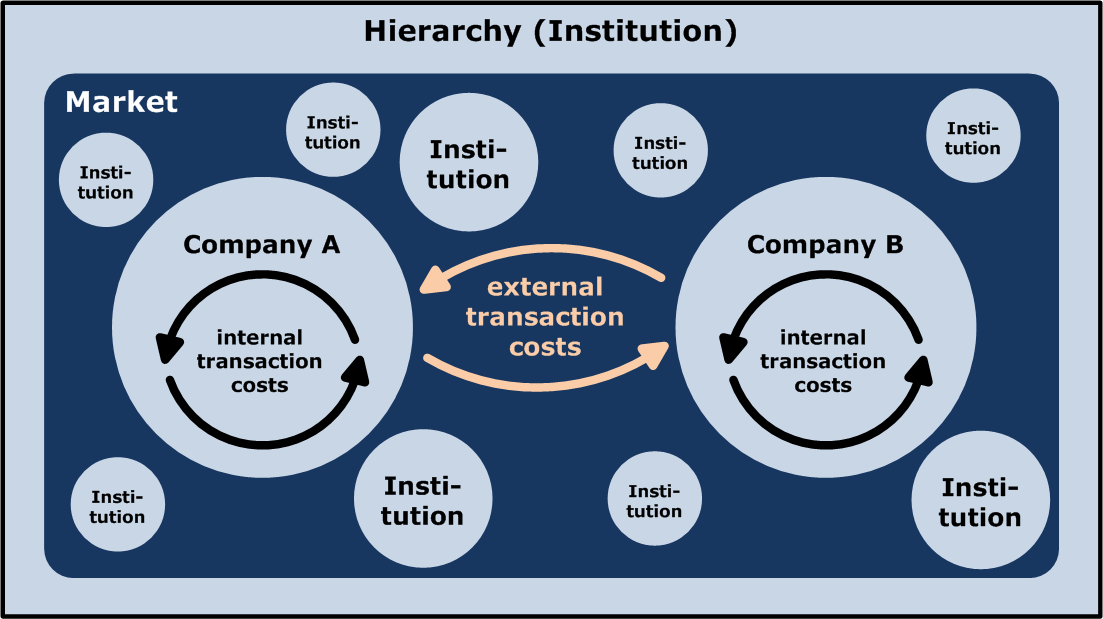
The pool shows institutions and market as a possible form of organization to coordinate economic transactions. When the external transaction costs are higher than the internal transaction costs, the company will grow. If the internal transaction costs are higher than the external transaction costs the company will be downsized by outsourcing, for example.

The idea that transactions form the basis of an economic theory was introduced by the institutional economist John R. Commons in 1931. He said that:

These individual actions are really trans-actions instead of either individual behavior or the "exchange" of commodities. It is this shift from commodities and individuals to transactions and working rules of collective action that marks the transition from the classical and hedonic schools to the institutional schools of economic thinking. The shift is a change in the ultimate unit of economic investigation. The classic and hedonic economists, with their communistic and anarchistic offshoots, founded their theories on the relation of man to nature, but institutionalism is a relation of man to man. The smallest unit of the classic economists was a commodity produced by labor. The smallest unit of the hedonic economists was the same or similar commodity enjoyed by ultimate consumers. One was the objective side, the other the subjective side, of the same relation between the individual and the forces of nature. The outcome, in either case, was the materialistic metaphor of an automatic equilibrium, analogous to the waves of the ocean, but personified as "seeking their level". But the smallest unit of the institutional economists is a unit of activity – a transaction, with its participants. Transactions intervene between the labor of the classic economists and the pleasures of the hedonic economists, simply because it is society that controls access to the forces of nature, and transactions are, not the "exchange of commodities", but the alienation and acquisition, between individuals, of the rights of property and liberty created by society, which must therefore be negotiated between the parties concerned before labor can produce, or consumers can consume, or commodities be physically exchanged".

— John R. Commons, Institutional Economics, American Economic Review, Vol.21, pp.648-657, 1931

The term "transaction cost" is frequently and mistakenly thought to have been coined by Ronald Coase, who used it to develop a theoretical framework for predicting when certain economic tasks would be performed by firms, and when they would be performed on the market. While he did not coin the specific term, Coase indeed discussed "costs of using the price mechanism" in his 1937 paper The Nature of the Firm, where he first discusses the concept of transaction costs, marking the first time that the concept of transaction costs was introduced into the study of enterprises and market organizations. The term "Transaction Costs" itself can be traced back to the monetary economics literature of the 1950s, and does not appear to have been consciously 'coined' by any particular individual.

Transaction cost as a formal theory started in the late 1960s and early 1970s. And refers to the "Costs of Market Transactions" in his seminal work, The Problem of Social Cost (1960).

Arguably, transaction cost reasoning became most widely known through Oliver E. Williamson's Transaction Cost Economics. Today, transaction cost economics is used to explain a number of different behaviours. Often this involves considering as "transactions" not only the obvious cases of buying and selling, but also day-to-day emotional interactions and informal gift exchanges. Williamson was one of the most cited social scientists at the turn of the century, and was later awarded the 2009 Nobel Memorial Prize in Economics.

Technologies associated with the Fourth Industrial Revolution such as distributed ledger technology and blockchains may reduce transaction costs when compared to traditional forms of contracting.

== Examples ==
A supplier may bid in a very competitive environment with a customer to build a widget. To make the widget, the supplier needs to build specialized machinery that cannot be used to make other products. Once the contract is awarded to the supplier, the relationship between customer and supplier changes from a competitive environment to a monopoly/monopsony relationship, known as a bilateral monopoly. This means that one party has greater leverage over another. To avoid these potential costs, "hostages" may be swapped, which may involve partial ownership in the widget factory and revenue sharing.

Car companies and their suppliers often fit into this category, with the car companies forcing price cuts on their suppliers. Defense suppliers and the military appear to have the opposite problem, with cost overruns occurring quite often.

An example of measurement, one of North's four factors of transaction costs, occurs when roving bandits calculate the success of their banditry based on how much money they can take from their citizens. Enforcement, the second of North's factors of transaction costs, may take the form of a mediator in dealings with the Sicilian mafia when it is not certain that both parties will maintain their end of the deal.

== Differences from neoclassical microeconomics ==
Williamson argues in The Mechanisms of Governance (1996) that Transaction Cost Economics (TCE) differs from neoclassical microeconomics in the following points:

Item	Neoclassical microeconomics	Transaction cost economics
Behavioural assumptions	Assumes hyperrationality and ignores most of the hazards related to opportunism	Assumes bounded rationality
Unit of analysis	Concerned with composite goods and services	Analyzes the transaction itself
Governance structure	Describes the firm as a production function (a technological construction)	Describes the firm as a governance structure (an organizational construction)
Problematic property rights and contracts	Often assumes that property rights are clearly defined and that the cost of enforcing those rights by the means of courts is negligible	Treats property rights and contracts as problematic
Discrete structural analysis	Uses continuous marginal modes of analysis in order to achieve second-order economizing (adjusting margins)	Analyzes the basic structures of the firm and its governance in order to achieve first-order economizing (improving the basic governance structure)
Remediableness	Recognizes profit maximization or cost minimization as criteria of efficiency	Argues that there is no optimal solution and that all alternatives are flawed, thus bounding "optimal" efficiency to the solution with no superior alternative and whose implementation produces net gains
Imperfect Markets	Downplays the importance of imperfect markets	Robert Almgren and Neil Chriss, and later Robert Almgren and Tianhui Li, showed that the effects of transaction costs lead portfolio managers and options traders to deviate from neoclassically optimal portfolios extending the original analysis to derivative markets.

The transaction costs frameworks reject the notion of instrumental rationality and its implications for predicting behavior. Whereas instrumental rationality assumes that an actor's understanding of the world is the same as the objective reality of the world, scholars who focus on transaction costs note that actors lack perfect information about the world (due to bounded rationality).

== Game theory ==
In game theory, transaction costs have been studied by Anderlini and Felli (2006). They consider a model with two parties who together can generate a surplus. Both parties are needed to create the surplus. Yet, before the parties can negotiate about dividing the surplus, each party must incur transaction costs. Anderlini and Felli find that transaction costs cause a severe problem when there is a mismatch between the parties' bargaining powers and the magnitude of the transaction costs. In particular, if a party has large transaction costs but in future negotiations it can seize only a small fraction of the surplus (i.e., its bargaining power is small), then this party will not incur the transaction costs and hence the total surplus will be lost. It has been shown that the presence of transaction costs as modelled by Anderlini and Felli can overturn central insights of the Grossman-Hart-Moore theory of the firm.

== Evaluative mechanisms ==
Oliver E. Williamson's theory of evaluative mechanisms assess economic entitles based on eight variables: bounded rationality, atmosphere, small numbers, information asymmetric, frequency of exchange, asset specificity, uncertainty, and threat of opportunism.

- Bounded Rationality: refers to the physical and mental, intellectual, emotional and other restrictions imposed by people participating in the transaction in order to maximize their interests.
- Atmosphere: The reason for increasing the difficulty of the transaction here is mostly because both parties to the transaction remain suspicious of the transaction, and the two sides are hostile to each other. Such a relationship cannot achieve a harmonious atmosphere, let alone a harmonious transaction relationship. This will cause both parties to increase security measures and increase expenditure during the transaction process.
- Small Numbers: Because the number of the two parties is not equal, the number of available transaction objects is reduced, and the market will be dominated by a few people, which leads to higher market expenditures. The main reason here is that some deals are too proprietary.
- Information Asymmetric: The pioneers in the market will control the direction of the market, and will know the information that is more beneficial to their own development earlier, and often these information will make opportunists and uncertain environments finalized, which will form a unique information gap. so as to form a transaction and obtain a profit
- Frequency of exchange: Frequency of exchange refers to buyer activity in the market or the frequency of transactions between the parties occurs. The higher the frequency of transactions, the higher the relative administrative and bargaining costs.
- Asset specificity: Asset specificity consist of site, physical asset, and human asset specificity. The asset specific investment is a specialized investment, which does not have market liquidity. Once the contract is terminated, the asset specific investment cannot to be redeployed. Therefore, a change or termination of this transaction will result in significant loss.
- Uncertainty: Uncertainty refers to the risks that may occur in a market exchange. The increase of environmental uncertainty will be accompanied by the increase of transaction cost, such as information acquisition cost, supervision cost and bargaining cost.
- Threat of opportunism: Threat of opportunism is attributed to human nature. Opportunistic behavior of vendors can lead to higher transaction coordination costs or even termination of contracts. A company can use governance mechanism to reducing the threat of opportunism.

== See also ==
- Diseconomy of scale
- Economic anthropology
- Herbert A. Simon
- Interaction cost
- Market impact
- Oliver E. Williamson
- Opportunity cost
- Property rights (economics)
- Ronald Coase
- Switching costs
- The Nature of the Firm
- Theory of the firm
- Transaction cost accounting
- Vertical integration
