= Operation Slapshot =

US police operation against illegal gambling

Operation Slapshot is the code name of an undercover police operation, spearheaded by New Jersey state police, against an illegal nationwide gambling ring.

== Details ==
The operation was made public on February 6, 2006. Rick Tocchet, an assistant coach for the Phoenix Coyotes, a team in the National Hockey League, and Janet Jones, the wife of ice hockey and NHL great Wayne Gretzky, were among those under investigation or indicted with charges pertaining to the operation. Also under investigation was suspended state trooper James Harney, who was allegedly Tocchet's partner in the operation.

The investigation also referred to the possibility of an NHL team owner, half a dozen active NHL players, and other coaches and team staff members being involved in this investigation. As of February 8, 2006, two more names were mentioned as people implicated by law enforcement officials: San Jose Sharks center Jeremy Roenick, and Toronto Maple Leafs center Travis Green.

=== Alleged Mafia connections ===
The ring was said to allegedly have ties to the Bruno-Scarfo crime family, which has a base of operations in and around Philadelphia, Pennsylvania and southern New Jersey. Additionally, many of the people named in news reporting about the case were said to have had longstanding Mafia connections, particularly in Philadelphia.

According to reporting by Knight Ridder newspapers at the time the Operation Slapshot news broke in February 2006, Tocchet had actually been linked to the Philadelphia mob decades earlier, from his original time playing for the Philadelphia Flyers in the late 1980s, where "his name was linked to South Philadelphia mobster Joseph "Skinny Joey" Merlino in FBI reports." In 1990, former Merlino associate Richard Barone testified against Merlino in a federal armored truck heist case; during debriefing sessions with the FBI, Barone said Merlino had bet heavily on hockey games, "often using information about injuries and players' status that he had obtained from Tocchet". Merlino was jailed in 1999.

James Harney, the New Jersey State Trooper who was Tocchet's partner in the gambling ring, had reportedly met Tocchet and other hockey players while Harney worked as a bartender at Legends in the South Philadelphia Holiday Inn, a few blocks from the city's sports complex, which "has been popular with athletes and wiseguys over the years.".

== Pleas and sentences ==
On August 3, 2006, former New Jersey state trooper James Harney pleaded guilty to conspiracy, promoting gambling and official misconduct, and promised to help authorities with their case against Tocchet and others. Harney said that he and Tocchet were 50–50 partners in the betting ring. Harney was sentenced to six years in prison on August 3, 2007.

On December 1, 2006, James Ulmer, 41, of Swedesboro, New Jersey pleaded guilty to conspiracy and promoting gambling, and agreed to cooperate with authorities.

On May 25, 2007, Tocchet pled guilty to conspiracy and promoting gambling, was placed on probation for two years for his role in Operation Slapshot, and avoided jail time. He was allowed to return to active duty in February, provided he refrained from future gambling. Tocchet completed his probation in 2008, and was hired as an assistant coach for the Tampa Bay Lightning in the same year. He went on to be hired as the head coach of the Vancouver Canucks in 2022, where he won the Jack Adams Coach of the Year award. He was hired as the head coach of the Philadelphia Flyers in 2025.
