= Norm Cox (designer) =

American interaction designer

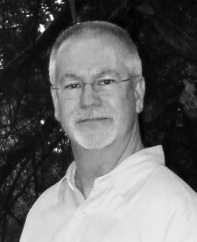
- Born: December 3, 1951 (age 74); Baton Rouge, Louisiana, U.S.
- Education: Louisiana State University (did not graduate)
- Known for: Hamburger Icon, Xerox Star
- Scientific career
- Fields: Computer science, human-computer interaction, user interface design

Norman Lloyd "Norm" Cox (born December 3, 1951) is an American interaction designer best known for inventing the hamburger icon.

== Impact on interaction design ==
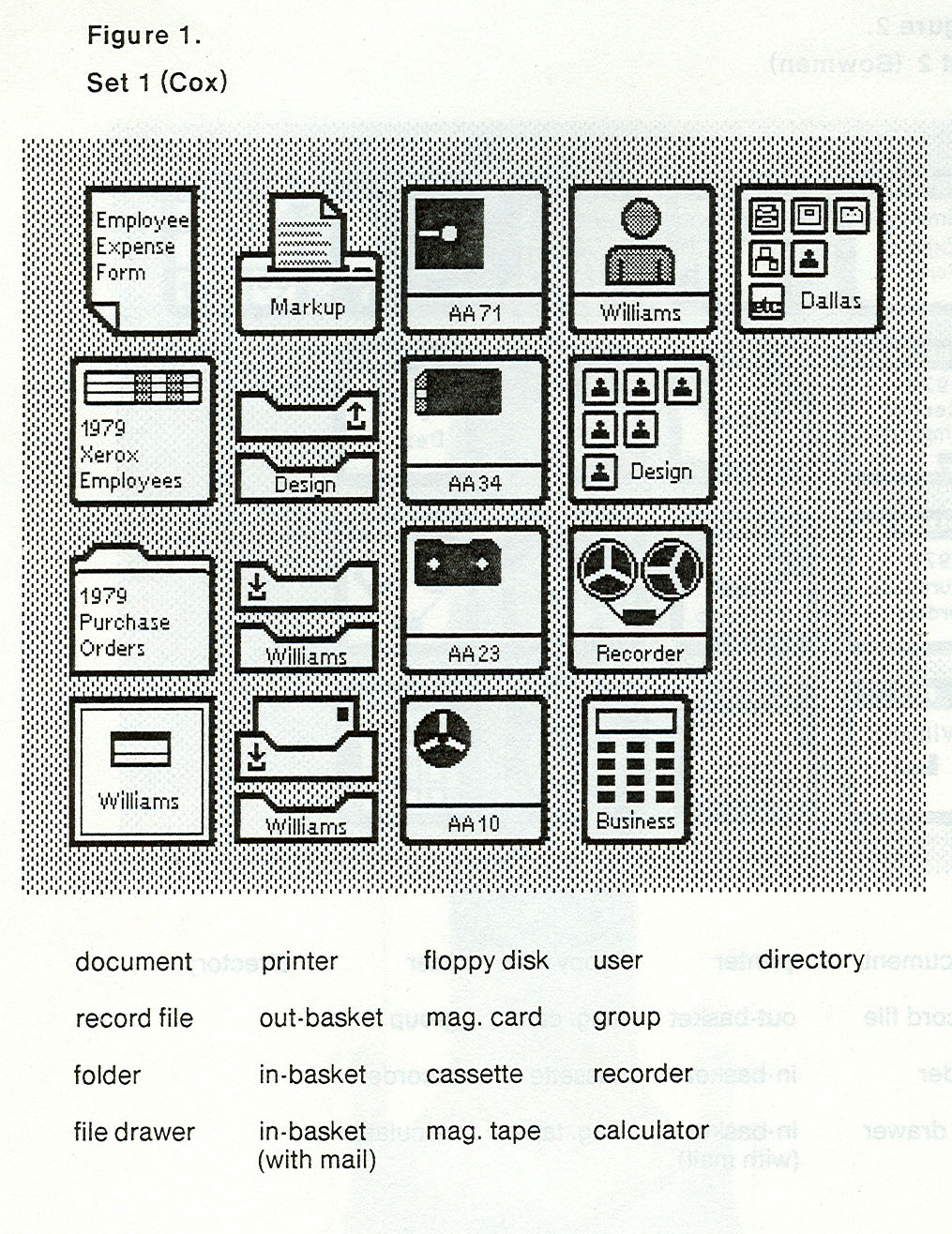
Icons on the Star

Norm Cox is most known for his design of the Hamburger button, a stack of three horizontal black lines. These lines resemble a list of items, which serve as a visual reminder of menu lists. The hamburger menu was designed to be simple, functionally memorable, and mimic the look of the resulting displayed menu list. Norm originally designed it as a "container" for contextual menu choices on the Xerox Star, similar to the contextual menu that's displayed today when we right mouse click on objects. The symbol is still in extensive use today as an indicator of a hidden menus on websites and smartphone apps. Additionally, Cox designed the visual style of the Xerox Star user interface elements and icons, including the document icon with the dog-eared corner and folder that are still in use today.

== Personal life ==
Cox was born in 1951 in Baton Rouge, Louisiana, United States. In his free time, Cox enjoys fly fishing, playing bluegrass music, creating art and woodworking.

== Education ==
Cox pursued his undergraduate study at Louisiana State University, where he majored in Architecture. During his time there, Cox enrolled in a wide variety of classes, with topics. While Cox originally pursued an architecture degree, he did not graduate from college; after his junior year at Louisiana State, Cox put his education on hold and joined Xerox's Office Products Division in Dallas, TX in 1972. He is also a college professor.

== Career timeline ==
Cox started his career working as a draftsman and mechanical designer at the Dallas' Xerox Office Products Division between designing parts and mechanisms for Xerox's line of electronic typewriters. In 1975 Norm met Robin Kinkead, manager of Xerox's Industrial Design and Human Factors department, whose group needed a graphic designer to develop printwheel and display fonts for the typewriters. After joining Kinkead's team, he was introduced to the Xerox Alto, a prototype computer based on a graphical user interface and desktop metaphor. He helped test their software for user-friendliness and ease of use, and often, used native software called Markup to create digital caricatures. Soon after, Xerox PARC needed someone to help design pictures on their screen (icons) that represented objects and machine functions. Norm sent in some samples of his digital work, which included "incoming mail", and was invited to work at PARC as the visual designer. In 1978 Norm arrived at Xerox PARC in Palo Alto, California to join the Xerox Star development team. He worked alongside Wallace Judd, Bill Bowman, and Dave Smith over the next few years to design and user test the Xerox Star graphical interface and icons. In 1982, Norm co-founded his design consultancy business Cox & Hall, which focuses on experience, usability, and design. He served as a consultant for international clients and projects spanning diverse industries and products. From 1988 to 1997, Cox was retained as IBM's corporate user experience design consultant to the IBM Design Program in Armonk, NY(]. From 2007 through 2015, he was retained as consultant and Director of User Experience to Samsung Telecommunications America in Richardson, TX. In 1988 he also served as an expert witness for the defense in the famous Apple v. Microsoft copyright infringement litigation.

== Awards and patents ==
Norm Cox is named as inventor on 29 invention and design patents relating to UI design for his clients through his personal consulting firm, Cox & Hall. He has also received numerous design awards, including the Xerox Opie award, IBM's Thomas J. Watson Design Excellence Award, the Lifetime Achievement Award in Design Thinking from the Dallas chapter of the Usability Professionals Association, and numerous industry awards for traditional graphic design.

== Popular culture ==
In 2024, Cox appeared as himself in a Finnish mockumentary about the invention of the hamburger icon, which purports to investigate whether the icon is specifically based on a Big Mac.
