= Rick Tocchet =

Canadian ice hockey player and coach

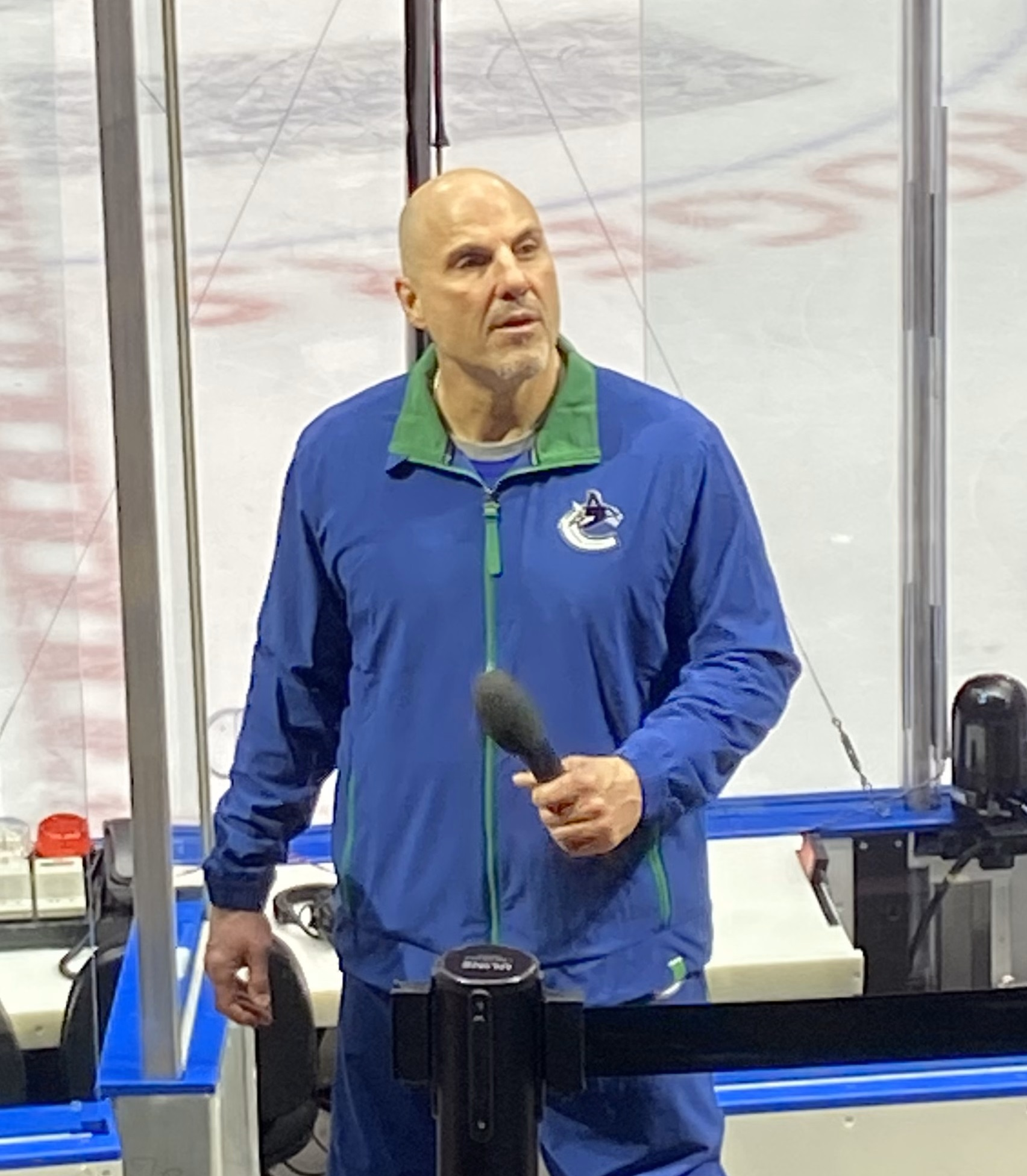
- Tocchet with the Vancouver Canucks in 2024
- Born: April 9, 1964 (age 62) Scarborough, Ontario, Canada
- Height: 6 ft 0 in (183 cm)
- Weight: 214 lb (97 kg; 15 st 4 lb)
- Position: Right wing
- Shot: Right
- Played for: Philadelphia Flyers; Pittsburgh Penguins; Los Angeles Kings; Boston Bruins; Washington Capitals; Phoenix Coyotes
- Current NHL coach: Philadelphia Flyers
- Coached for: Tampa Bay Lightning; Arizona Coyotes; Vancouver Canucks
- National team: Canada
- NHL draft: 121st overall, 1983; Philadelphia Flyers
- Playing career: 1984–2002
- Coaching career: 2002–present

Richard Tocchet (/tɔːkət/ TAW-kət; born April 9, 1964) is a Canadian professional ice hockey coach and former player who is the head coach for the Philadelphia Flyers of the National Hockey League (NHL). He was selected in the sixth round, 121st overall, by the Flyers in the 1983 NHL entry draft and also played for the Pittsburgh Penguins, Los Angeles Kings, Boston Bruins, Washington Capitals, and Phoenix Coyotes. He formerly served as the head coach for the Tampa Bay Lightning, Arizona Coyotes, and Vancouver Canucks. Tocchet won the Jack Adams Award for coach of the year in 2024.

== Playing career ==
Tocchet was born in the Toronto suburb of Scarborough, Ontario. As a youth, Tocchet played in the 1977 Quebec International Pee-Wee Hockey Tournament with a minor ice hockey team from Toronto.

After being drafted in the sixth round (121st overall) by the Philadelphia Flyers in the 1983 NHL entry draft, Tocchet returned to the OHL's Sault Ste. Marie Greyhounds for another year of junior hockey. After registering 108 points with Sault Ste. Marie, Tocchet came to the Flyers for the 1984–85 season, scoring 39 points and helping the team to the 1985 Stanley Cup Final. He was mainly known as a fighter in his early career but soon developed his skills enough to become a respected power forward, a team leader, and a four-time NHL All-Star. He had memorable fights with other power forwards such as Wendel Clark and Cam Neely. He had 18 Gordie Howe hat tricks during his career, which is the most in NHL history.

In 1992, Tocchet was traded to the Pittsburgh Penguins, along with Kjell Samuelsson and Ken Wregget, in exchange for Mark Recchi. In 14 playoff games, he scored 19 points, helping the Penguins repeat as Stanley Cup champions.

Tocchet became a well-travelled veteran in the league after his stint with the Penguins, taking roles with the Los Angeles Kings, Boston Bruins, Washington Capitals, and Phoenix Coyotes. He was dealt along with Adam Oates and Bill Ranford from the Bruins to the Capitals for Anson Carter, Jason Allison, Jim Carey, a third-round selection in the 1997 draft and a conditional second-round pick in the 1998 draft in a blockbuster deal on March 1, 1997. Both Tocchet and Carter would work together as studio analysts with the NHL on TNT nearly a quarter of a century later beginning in 2021. Tocchet became an unrestricted free agent on June 15, 1997 and signed a three-year contract with the Phoenix Coyotes 23 days later on July 8. After returning to the Flyers in a trade that sent Mikael Renberg to the Coyotes on March 8, 2000, he added 11 points en route to an Eastern Conference final berth. Tocchet retired after the 2001–02 season, being one of several players in NHL history to collect 400 goals and 2,000 penalty minutes including Brendan Shanahan and Gary Roberts.

== Coaching career ==
Tocchet became an assistant coach for the Colorado Avalanche in 2002–03. In the summer of 2005, he became an assistant coach with the Phoenix Coyotes. On December 17, 2005, Tocchet took over as interim head coach for Phoenix, stepping in while head coach Wayne Gretzky was out on an indefinite leave of absence due to his mother's illness (and subsequent death). The team went 2–3–0 under Tocchet. Gretzky eventually resumed his duties on December 28.

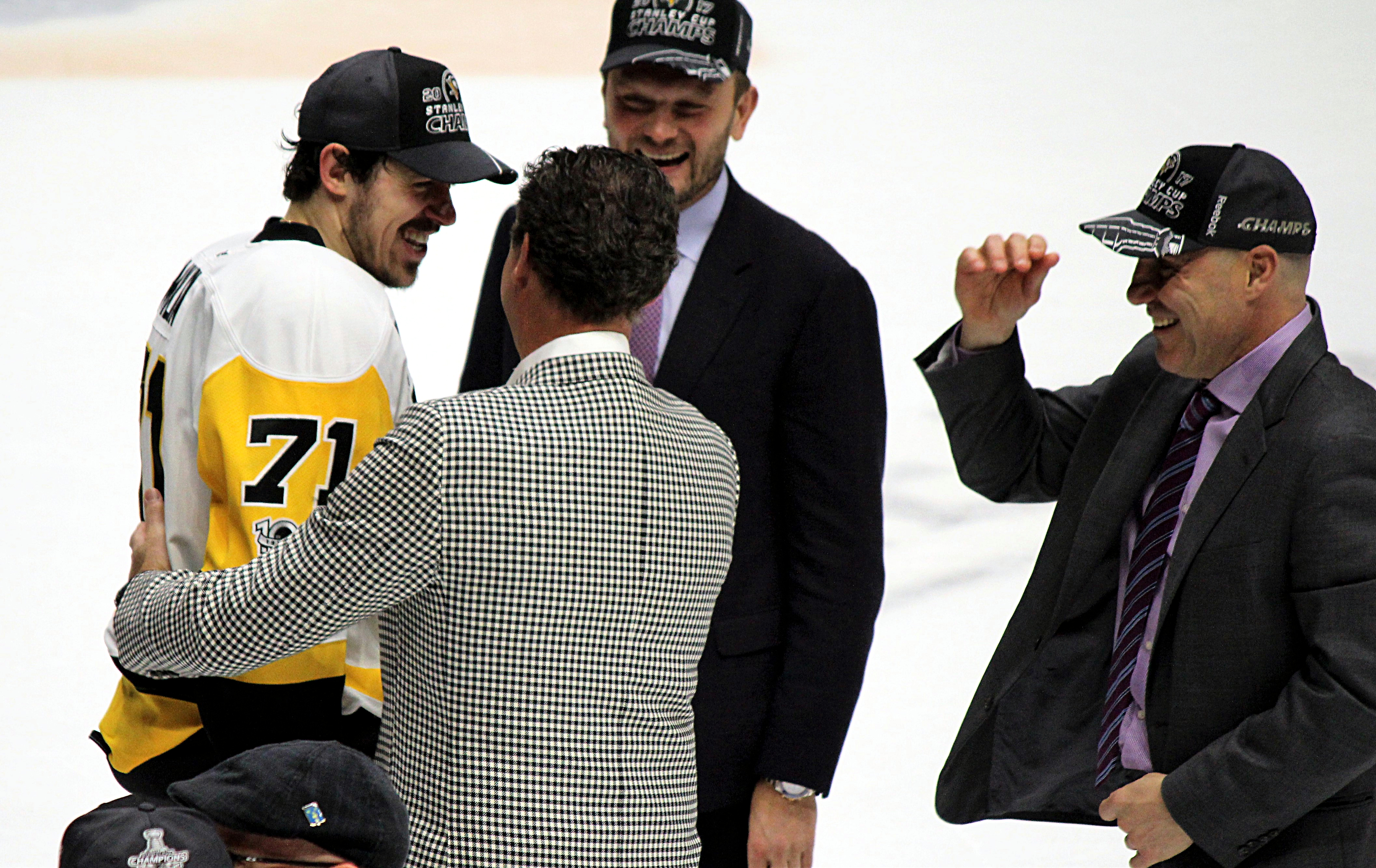
Tocchet and the Penguins celebrating their 2017 Stanley Cup win.

Tocchet was named as the associate coach of the Tampa Bay Lightning on July 9, 2008. On November 14, he was named the interim head coach of the Lightning, replacing Barry Melrose who was fired two days earlier after compiling a 5–7–4 record. Tocchet lost his first game to the Carolina Hurricanes in a shootout. Tocchet's first win came two games later on November 21, against the Nashville Predators. However, he would go on to lose his next nine games, and twelve of the next thirteen. On May 11, 2009, Tocchet had the interim tag removed and was named Lightning Head Coach. On April 12, 2010 he was relieved of his coaching duties by the new ownership of the Tampa Bay Lightning. On June 25, 2014, he was hired by the Pittsburgh Penguins to be an assistant coach. On June 12, 2016, Tocchet won the Stanley Cup with the Penguins. He won his second Stanley Cup as an assistant coach on June 11, 2017, when the Penguins defeated the Nashville Predators in six games.

On July 11, 2017, Tocchet was named head coach for the Arizona Coyotes. On February 29, 2020, Tocchet earned his 100th win as head coach of the Coyotes in a 5–2 victory over the Buffalo Sabres. After the 2020–21 season, Tocchet and the Coyotes mutually agreed to part ways.

On January 22, 2023, Tocchet was named head coach of the Vancouver Canucks to replace Bruce Boudreau. The 2023–24 season, Tocchet's first full season in charge was a major success for the team, who won the Pacific Division title in the regular season. The Canucks reached the second round of the 2024 playoffs, losing to the Edmonton Oilers in seven games. Tocchet received the Jack Adams Award as the NHL coach of the year. On April 29, 2025, the Canucks announced that Tocchet would not return as head coach.

On May 14, 2025, Tocchet was named head coach of the Philadelphia Flyers.

== Analyst ==
After leaving Tampa Bay, Tocchet served alongside Michael Barkann, Al Morganti, Bill Clement, and Steve Coates as a Flyers Postgame Live panelist on Comcast SportsNet.

He joined TNT's ice hockey coverage in 2021 as a studio analyst, and later briefly returned in 2025 after his stint with the Canucks.

== Gambling, horse racing, and Operation Slapshot ==
The late entrepreneur, racehorse owner, and gambler Dan Borislow was a good friend of Tocchet's. Borislow's most successful horse was named 'Toccet', a misspelled tribute to Tocchet. Toccet won four graded stakes, including the Champagne and Hollywood Futurity in 2002. The horse was named runner-up to Vindication for the American Champion Two-Year-Old Colt in 2002, a part of the Eclipse Award. Once a favorite to enter the 2003 Kentucky Derby, Toccet was derailed by ankle injuries early in the year. He won one listed stakes after his juvenile season out of 15 starts and now stands at Castleton Lyons.

Borislow also co-owned a horse named Wild Desert that had a controversial win at the 2005 Queen's Plate. Wild Desert's other co-owners were baseball manager Joe Torre and former NHL player Keith Jones, who as of 2026 works with Tocchet as the president of hockey operations for the Philadelphia Flyers.

On February 6, 2006, Tocchet was served with a criminal complaint, accused of financing a nationwide sports gambling ring based in New Jersey in which several current NHL players wagered. The ring was discovered by New Jersey state police, in the undercover investigation Operation Slapshot. "It's not a hockey-related issue, it's a football thing. And at this time I can't comment any further," Tocchet told The Arizona Republic after the Coyotes practiced on February 7. The following day, Tocchet requested a leave of absence from NHL Commissioner Gary Bettman, which was granted with a number of conditions including that Tocchet was to have no contact with NHL personnel, that the leave of absence would not end without Bettman's consent and that the Commissioner reserved the right to modify the terms of the leave of absence at any time.

The Operation Slapshot gambling ring was claimed by New Jersey State Police to allegedly have ties to the Bruno-Scarfo crime family, which has a base of operations in and around Philadelphia and southern New Jersey. According to a report by Knight Ridder newspapers at the time the Operation Slapshot news broke in February 2006, Tocchet had actually been linked to the Philadelphia mob decades earlier, from his original time playing for the Philadelphia Flyers in the late 1980s, where "his name was linked to South Philadelphia mobster Joseph "Skinny Joey" Merlino in FBI reports." In 1990, former Merlino associate Richard Barone testified against Merlino in a federal armored truck heist case; during debriefing sessions with the FBI, Barone said Merlino had bet heavily on ice hockey games, "often using information about injuries and players' status that he had obtained from Tocchet". Merlino was jailed in 1999.

Also in February 2006, Tocchet's friend Borislow spoke to the press about Operation Slapshot, defending Tocchet's reputation. Borislow commented: "I used to bet on sports. And, $1.4-million? I would do that in an afternoon...I'm one of the largest bettors in the country."

On May 8, 2006, attorneys for Tocchet and Gretzky's wife Janet Jones filed notices in New Jersey that they intended to sue the state for $50 million each for defamation. Both Tocchet and Jones claimed to have lost business opportunities in the wake of the state's investigation, which had sullied their reputations.

On August 3, former New Jersey state trooper James Harney pleaded guilty to conspiracy, promoting gambling, and official misconduct, and promised to help authorities with their case against Tocchet and others. Harney said that he and Tocchet were 50–50 partners in the betting ring. During the investigation, it was reported that Harney had originally met Tocchet and other ice hockey players while Tocchet played for the Flyers and Harney worked as a bartender at Legends in the South Philadelphia Holiday Inn, a few blocks from the city's sports complex, which "has been popular with athletes and wiseguys over the years."

On May 25, 2007, Tocchet pleaded guilty to conspiracy and promoting gambling. New Jersey Attorney General Anne Milgram announced on August 17, that Tocchet had been sentenced to two years probation in exchange for his plea. He could have received up to five years in New Jersey state prison, but there was a presumption against incarceration for first-time offenders who plead guilty to such crimes.

The NHL subsequently issued a statement from Gary Bettman, but his spokesman would not answer questions, including if Tocchet had a future in ice hockey. In late 2007, Bettman issued another statement indicating that Tocchet would not be eligible to return to the league until February 7, 2008. In addition to the initial criminal conduct, the Commissioner cited a number of aggravating factors including repeated illicit contact with NHL personnel and Tocchet's participation in the World Series of Poker to justify imposing a de facto two-year suspension.

During a press conference on February 6, 2008, it was announced that Tocchet would be reinstated and would serve as assistant coach the next day, exactly two years after taking the leave of absence. Among other conditions of his reinstatement, Tocchet was ordered by Bettman to abstain from all forms of gambling.

== Career statistics ==
=== Regular season and playoffs ===
			Regular season					Playoffs
Season	Team	League	GP	G	A	Pts	PIM	GP	G	A	Pts	PIM
1980–81	St. Michael's Midget Buzzers	MTHL	41	28	46	74	—	—	—	—	—	—
1980–81	St. Michael's Buzzers	MetJHL	5	1	1	2	2	—	—	—	—	—
1981–82	Sault Ste. Marie Greyhounds	OHL	59	7	15	22	184	11	1	1	2	28
1982–83	Sault Ste. Marie Greyhounds	OHL	66	32	34	66	146	16	4	13	17	67
1983–84	Sault Ste. Marie Greyhounds	OHL	64	44	64	108	209	16	22	14	36	41
1984–85	Philadelphia Flyers	NHL	75	14	25	39	181	19	3	4	7	72
1985–86	Philadelphia Flyers	NHL	69	14	21	35	284	5	1	2	3	26
1986–87	Philadelphia Flyers	NHL	69	21	28	49	288	26	11	10	21	72
1987–88	Philadelphia Flyers	NHL	65	31	33	64	299	5	1	4	5	55
1988–89	Philadelphia Flyers	NHL	66	45	36	81	183	16	6	6	12	69
1989–90	Philadelphia Flyers	NHL	75	37	59	96	196	—	—	—	—	—
1990–91	Philadelphia Flyers	NHL	70	40	31	71	150	—	—	—	—	—
1991–92	Philadelphia Flyers	NHL	42	13	16	29	102	—	—	—	—	—
1991–92	Pittsburgh Penguins	NHL	19	14	16	30	49	14	6	13	19	24
1992–93	Pittsburgh Penguins	NHL	80	48	61	109	252	12	7	6	13	24
1993–94	Pittsburgh Penguins	NHL	51	14	26	40	134	6	2	3	5	20
1994–95	Los Angeles Kings	NHL	36	18	17	35	70	—	—	—	—	—
1995–96	Los Angeles Kings	NHL	44	13	23	36	117	—	—	—	—	—
1995–96	Boston Bruins	NHL	27	16	8	24	64	5	4	0	4	21
1996–97	Boston Bruins	NHL	40	16	14	30	67	—	—	—	—	—
1996–97	Washington Capitals	NHL	13	5	5	10	31	—	—	—	—	—
1997–98	Phoenix Coyotes	NHL	68	26	19	45	157	6	6	2	8	25
1998–99	Phoenix Coyotes	NHL	81	26	30	56	147	7	0	3	3	8
1999–2000	Phoenix Coyotes	NHL	64	12	17	29	67	—	—	—	—	—
1999–2000	Philadelphia Flyers	NHL	16	3	3	6	23	18	5	6	11	49
2000–01	Philadelphia Flyers	NHL	60	14	22	36	83	6	0	1	1	6
2001–02	Philadelphia Flyers	NHL	14	0	2	2	28	—	—	—	—	—
NHL totals			1,144	440	512	952	2,972	145	52	60	112	471

=== International ===
Year	Team	Event	GP	G	A	Pts	PIM
1987	Canada	CC	7	3	2	5	8
1990	Canada	WC	10	4	2	6	14
1991	Canada	CC	8	1	1	2	10
Senior totals			25	8	5	13	32

== Head coaching record ==
Team	Year	Regular season						Postseason			
Team	Year	G	W	L	OTL	Pts	Finish	W	L	Win%	Result
TBL	2008–09	66	19	33	14	(52)	5th in Southeast	—	—	—	Missed playoffs
TBL	2009–10	82	34	36	12	80	4th in Southeast	—	—	—	Missed playoffs
TBL total		148	53	69	26			—	—	—	
ARI	2017–18	82	29	41	12	70	8th in Pacific	—	—	—	Missed playoffs
ARI	2018–19	82	39	35	8	86	4th in Pacific	—	—	—	Missed playoffs
ARI	2019–20	70*	33	29	8	74	5th in Pacific	4	5	.444	Lost in first round (COL)
ARI	2020–21	56	24	26	6	54	5th in West	—	—	—	Missed playoffs
ARI total		290	125	131	34			4	5	.444	1 playoff appearance
VAN	2022–23	36	20	12	4	(44)	6th in Pacific	—	—	—	Missed playoffs
VAN	2023–24	82	50	23	9	109	1st in Pacific	7	6	.538	Lost in second round (EDM)
VAN	2024–25	82	38	30	14	90	5th in Pacific	—	—	—	Missed playoffs
VAN total		200	108	65	27			7	6	.538	1 playoff appearance
PHI	2025–26	82	43	27	12	98	3rd in Metropolitan	4	6	.400	Lost in second round (CAR)
PHI total		82	43	27	12			4	6	.400	1 playoff appearance
NHL total		720	329	292	99			15	17	.469	3 playoff appearances

* Shortened season due to the COVID-19 pandemic during the 2019–20 season. Playoffs were played in August 2020 with a different format.

== Awards and honours ==
Award	Year	Ref
Juniors
MetJBHL champion	1981	
NHL
NHL All-Star Game	1989, 1990, 1991, 1993, 2024 (Note: As head coach)	
Stanley Cup champion	1992, 2016, (Note: As assistant coach) 2017	
Jack Adams Award	2024	
Philadelphia Flyers
Flyers Hall of Fame	2021	
International
Canada Cup champion	1987, 1991	
4 Nations Face-Off champion	2025	

=== Records ===
- Philadelphia Flyers all-time leader in Gordie Howe hat tricks – 9
- NHL all-time leader in Gordie Howe hat tricks – 18

== See also ==
- Operation Slapshot
- Captain (ice hockey)
- Power forward (ice hockey)
- List of NHL players with 100-point seasons
- List of NHL players with 1,000 games played
- List of NHL players with 2,000 career penalty minutes

== Notes ==
Awards
Preceded by Ron Hextall	Bobby Clarke Trophy; 1990	Succeeded by Pelle Eklund
Preceded by Jim Montgomery	Jack Adams Award; 2024	Succeeded by Spencer Carbery
Sporting positions
Preceded by Ron Sutter	Philadelphia Flyers captain 1991–1992	Succeeded by Kevin Dineen
Preceded by Barry Melrose	Head coach of the Tampa Bay Lightning; 2008–2010	Succeeded by Guy Boucher
Preceded by Dave Tippett	Head coach of the Arizona Coyotes; 2017–2021	Succeeded by André Tourigny
Preceded by Bruce Boudreau	Head coach of the Vancouver Canucks; 2023–2025	Succeeded by Adam Foote
Preceded by Brad Shaw (interim)	Head coach of the Philadelphia Flyers; 2025–present	Incumbent
