= Firm (disambiguation) =

A firm is a commercial partnership of two or more people.

Firm or The Firm may also refer to:

== Entertainment ==
=== Film and television ===
- The Firm (1989 film), a British drama
- The Firm (1993 film), an American legal thriller based on John Grisham's novel
- The Firm (2009 film), a remake of the 1989 film
- The Firm (2012 TV series), a Canadian television series and a sequel to the 1993 film
- The Firm (Malaysian TV series), a TV series that began in 2007

=== Music ===
- The Firm (album), album by rock group The Firm
- The Firm (soundtrack), an album by Dave Grusin
- The Firm (hip hop group), an American hip hop supergroup between 1996 and 1998
- The Firm (novelty band), a band best known for their hits "Star Trekkin'" and "Arthur Daley E's Alright"
- The Firm (rock band), a British rock band that was active from 1984 to 1986 with Paul Rodgers and Jimmy Page.

=== Other entertainment ===
- The Firm (novel), a novel by John Grisham
- The Firm: The Inside Story of McKinsey, a book by Duff McDonald
- "The Firm", J. C. Williamson's, Australian show-business organization

== Ships ==
- USS Firm (AM-444), an Aggressive-class minesweeper launched in 1953
- USS Firm (AM-98), an Adroit-class minesweeper laid down in 1941
- HMS Firm, eight Royal Navy ships

== Other ==
- The Firm, slang for the inner British royal family
- The FIRM, a brand of workout videos and fitness products
- The Firm, Inc., a talent management company
- Fair Immigration Reform Movement
- Flood insurance rate map
- British firms (organised crime)

== See also ==
- Hooligan firm, a violent football supporters' group
- The Old Firm and New Firm, Scottish football rivalries
- Fire Information for Resource Management System
- Fishery Resources Monitoring System (FIRMS)
