= Triple bar =

Symbol with multiple meanings

≡o

Identical to
- U+2261 ≡ IDENTICAL TO (&Congruent;, &equiv;)

≢o

Not identical to
- U+2262 ≢ NOT IDENTICAL TO (&nequiv;, &NotCongruent;)

The triple bar or tribar, ≡, is a symbol with multiple, context-dependent meanings indicating equivalence of two different things. Its main uses are in mathematics and logic. It has the appearance of an equals sign ⟨=⟩ with a third line.

== Encoding ==
The triple bar character in Unicode is code point U+2261 ≡ IDENTICAL TO (&Congruent;, &equiv;). The closely related code point U+2262 ≢ NOT IDENTICAL TO (&nequiv;, &NotCongruent;) is the same symbol with a slash through it, indicating the negation of its mathematical meaning.

In LaTeX mathematical formulas, the code \equiv produces the triple bar symbol and \not\equiv produces the negated triple bar symbol $\not\equiv$ as output.

== Uses ==
=== Mathematics and philosophy ===
In logic, it is used with two different but related meanings. It can refer to the if and only if connective, also called material equivalence. This is a binary operation whose value is true when its two arguments have the same value as each other. Alternatively, in some texts ⇔ is used with this meaning, while ≡ is used for the higher-level metalogical notion of logical equivalence, according to which two formulas are logically equivalent when all models give them the same value. Gottlob Frege used a triple bar for a more philosophical notion of identity, in which two statements (not necessarily in mathematics or formal logic) are identical if they can be freely substituted for each other without change of meaning.

In mathematics, the triple bar is sometimes used as a symbol of identity or an equivalence relation (although not the only one; other common choices include ~ and ≈). Particularly, in geometry, it may be used either to show that two figures are congruent or that they are identical. In number theory, it has been used beginning with Carl Friedrich Gauss (who first used it with this meaning in 1801) to mean modular congruence: $a \equiv b \pmod N$ if N divides a − b.

In category theory, triple bars may be used to connect objects in a commutative diagram, indicating that they are actually the same object rather than being connected by an arrow of the category.

This symbol is also sometimes used in place of an equal sign for equations that define the symbol on the left-hand side of the equation, to contrast them with equations in which the terms on both sides of the equation were already defined. An alternative notation for this usage is to typeset the letters "def" above an ordinary equality sign, $a\mathrel{\stackrel{\scriptscriptstyle \mathrm{def}}{=}}b$. Similarly, another alternative notation for this usage is to precede the equals sign with a colon, $a:=b$. The colon notation has the advantage that it reflects the inherent asymmetry in the definition of one object from already defined objects.

=== Science ===
In botanical nomenclature, the triple bar denotes homotypic synonyms (those based on the same type specimen), to distinguish them from heterotypic synonyms (those based on different type specimens), which are marked with an equals sign.

In chemistry, the triple bar can be used to represent a triple bond between atoms. For example, HC≡CH is a common shorthand for acetylene (systematic name: ethyne).

=== Programming ===
In the APL programming language, the ≡ and ≢ symbols are used to compare to two arrays for equality and inequality respectively. This is in contrast to the symbols = and ≠ which compares the individual elements in an order array with the elements of another array.

=== Application design ===
In mobile, web, and general application design, a similar symbol is sometimes used as an interface element, where it is called a hamburger icon. The element typically indicates that a navigation menu can be accessed when the element is activated; the bars of the symbol may be seen as stylized menu items, and some variations of this symbols add more bars, or bullet points to each bar, to enhance this visual similarity. Usage of this symbol dates back to the early computer interfaces developed at Xerox PARC in the 1980s. It is also similar to the icon frequently used to indicate justified text alignment. It is an oft-used component of Google's Material Design guidelines and many Android apps and web apps that follow these guidelines make use of the hamburger menu.
