= FIRMS =

FIRMS may refer to:

- Fishery Resources Monitoring System
- Fire Information for Resource Management System, near real-time active fire locations provided by NASA

== See also ==
- Firm (disambiguation)
