= Interaction cost =

Interaction cost can comprise work, costs, and other expenses, required to complete a task or interaction. This applies to several categories, including:

- Economy: the interaction cost of purchase includes the requirements to complete it and differs in costs for customers and vendors. The method of payment offered may factor into both transaction cost and interaction cost. Reducing steps for customers can be a service offered by the vendor. Interaction costs should be considered when clients choose vendors. Customers prefer to have a choice about their interaction cost. In self-checkout, work is moved to the customer.
- Politics: Specific interaction costs can be increased by law for political gains.
- User interface: In a computer menu with a graphical user interface, some designs require more clicks from the user in order to make a selection. With a dropdown menu, one click (or touch or hover) may reveal a hidden menu (sub-menu), with a second click required to select the menu option. If the entire menu were displayed all along, as in a navigation bar, only one click would be required, but the menu would occupy more screen space. Sub-menus require even more care from the user to make a desired selection.
