= Janet Jones =

American actress

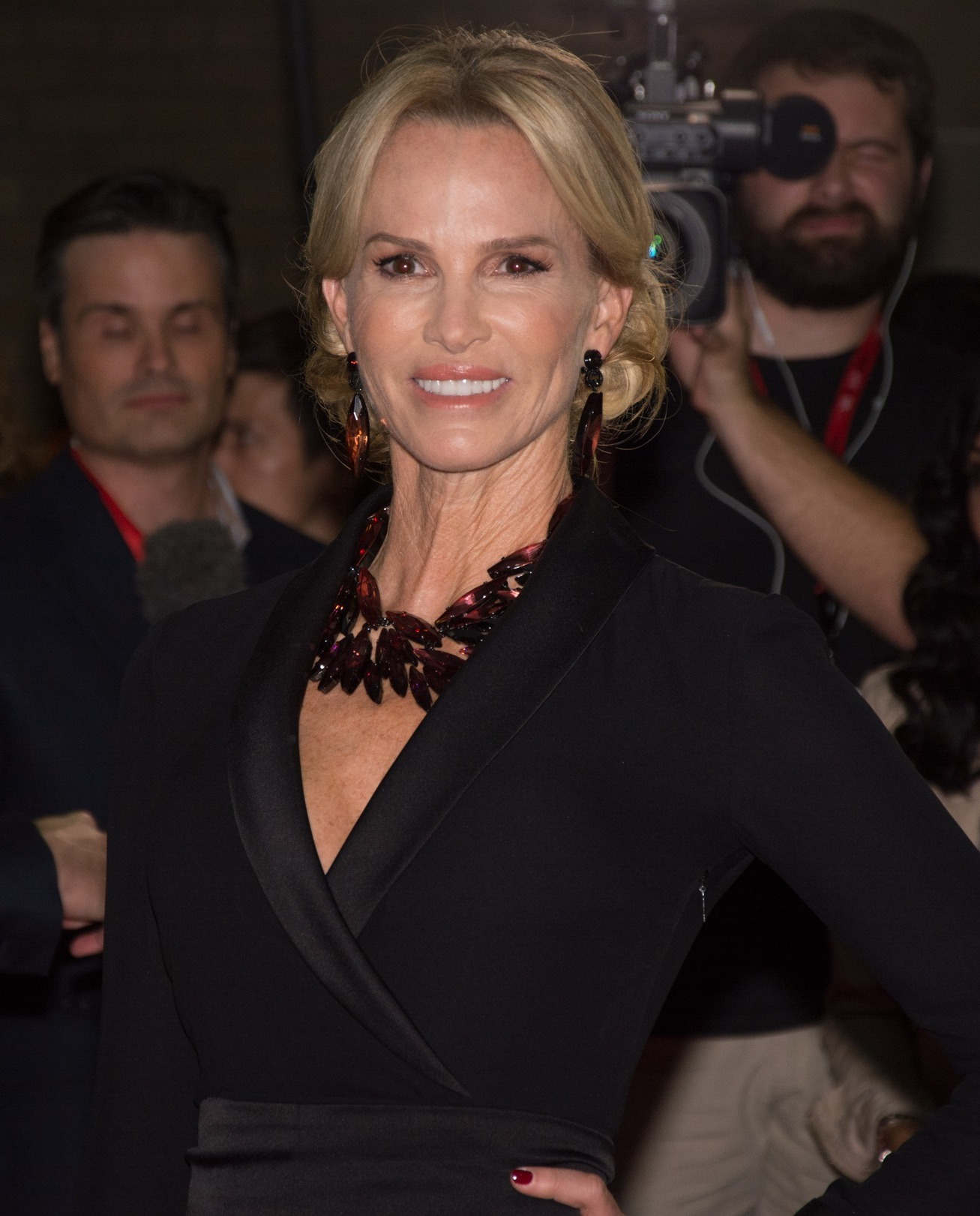
- Jones arriving at the 2014 Toronto International Film Festival
- Born: Janet Marie Jones; January 10, 1961 (age 65); Bridgeton, Missouri, U.S.
- Citizenship: United States
- Occupations: Actress, dancer
- Years active: 1982–present
- Spouse: Wayne Gretzky (m. 1988)
- Children: 5
- Relatives: Dustin Johnson (son-in-law)

Janet Marie Gretzky (née Jones; born January 10, 1961) is an American actress and dancer. She is married to Canadian ice hockey Hall of Fame player Wayne Gretzky.

== Early life and education ==
Janet Marie Jones was born in Bridgeton, Missouri, the daughter of a business executive. She attended Pattonville High School in Maryland Heights, Missouri.

== Entertainment career ==
One of Jones's earliest appearances was as a contestant on Merv Griffin's syndicated U.S. television program Dance Fever in 1979, and later as a member of the dance duo Motion, dancing choreographed routines with the show's host, Deney Terrio. Jones performed in Annie (1982), Staying Alive (1983) and Snow White Live (1980), and had a bit part in The Beastmaster (1982). She also had a small role in the musical comedy, Grease 2 (1982). On April 4, 1983, Jones was a contestant on the television game show The Price Is Right. Her big break came in The Flamingo Kid (1984), which was followed by the film version of A Chorus Line (1985). In 1986, she appeared in American Anthem, co-starring gymnast Mitch Gaylord and, in 1987, she appeared on the cover and in a semi-nude pictorial in the March issue of Playboy.

Other credits include 1988's Police Academy 5: Assignment Miami Beach and the baseball film A League of Their Own (1992) with Geena Davis, Rosie O'Donnell, and Madonna.

Jones served as host of an infomercial for Jackie Chan and as the "master instructor" for a workout video produced by The FIRM. She and daughter Paulina were featured in the movie Alpha Dog.

Playing on her surname, she appeared in a 1986 TV commercial endorsing Jones Sausage along with other people who shared her last name.

== Personal life ==
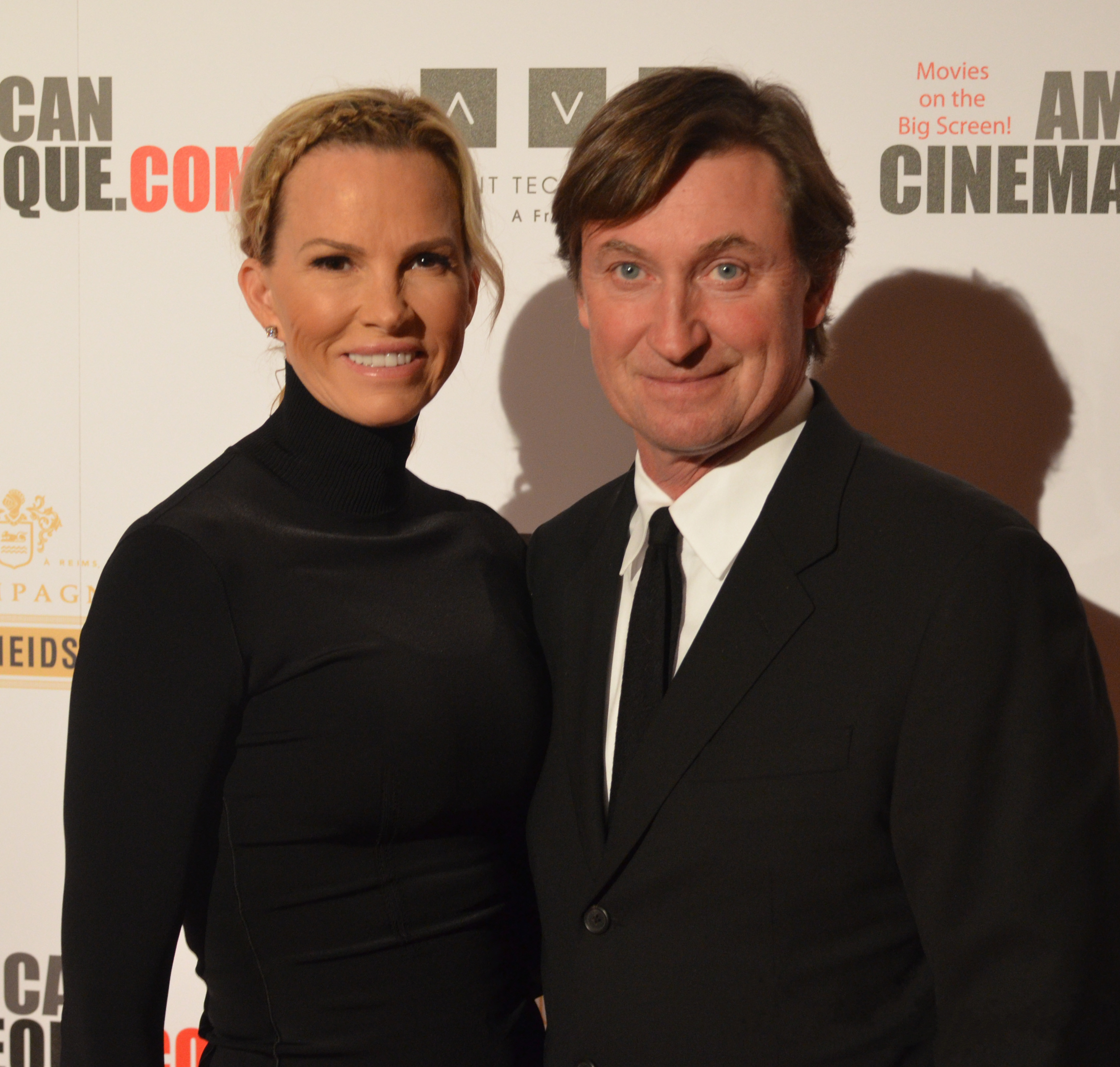
Janet and Wayne Gretzky in 2013

Jones, who was engaged to Vitas Gerulaitis from 1985 to 1987, first met Gretzky when he was a judge on Dance Fever in 1984. They met again at a Los Angeles Lakers game in 1987, and on July 16, 1988, married in a lavish ceremony at St. Joseph's Basilica in Edmonton that was broadcast live across Canada. That August 9, Gretzky was traded to the Los Angeles Kings. One of the motivations behind the deal was rumored to be furthering Jones' career. Jones refuted this in the 2009 documentary Kings Ransom, stating that she would not have allowed herself to become "barefoot and pregnant for the next eight years" were she intent on pursuing her career. She and Gretzky have five children: Paulina, Ty Robert, Trevor Douglas, Tristan Wayne, and Emma Marie. Her daughter Paulina was on the Canadian cover of the Flare (magazine) August 2005, seventeen years after Janet appeared on the cover, making them the first mother-daughter pair to appear on the cover of Flare Magazine.

Paulina and Dustin Johnson announced their engagement on August 18, 2013. Ty played hockey at Shattuck-Saint Mary's. Trevor was drafted by the Chicago Cubs in the 2011 MLB draft. He was traded on March 20, 2014, to the Los Angeles Angels of Anaheim for Matt Scioscia, son of Angels' manager Mike Scioscia. In June 2014, he was named to the roster of the Orem Owlz.

Jones introduced Vanna White to Merv Griffin while appearing on Dance Fever, leading White to her long-term engagement as a presenter on Wheel of Fortune.

== Gambling-ring controversy ==
On February 7, 2006, Jones and a half-dozen NHL players were among those implicated in a New Jersey–based sports gambling ring allegedly financed by Phoenix Coyotes assistant coach Rick Tocchet. Then-Coyotes' general manager and Gretzky's former agent, Michael Barnett, admitted to placing a bet on Super Bowl XL through Tocchet.

Gretzky told reporters that Jones "would sit down at some point and answer questions that everybody has for her and be her own person" while denying any involvement. Jones released a statement through the Coyotes: "At no time did I ever place a wager on my husband's behalf. Other than the occasional horse race, my husband does not bet on any sports."

The Newark Star-Ledger revealed that New Jersey State Police wiretaps have Gretzky speaking about the ring. Lawyers for the couple later announced that there was no evidence of any betting on their part, and neither would face criminal charges. "They were trying to paint something that just wasn't true," Jones later told Chatelaine Magazine. "It's unfair that Wayne and I have had a great marriage for 20 years and a nice family, and the people in the media could care less [sic] if they are trying to cause friction in your marriage, trouble in your family, and make your kids feel a certain way. That was a little hurtful because it was like, 'Why? What have we ever done to you?'" In 2007, she took part in a high-stakes golf tournament broadcast by ESPN. The NHL prohibits personnel from betting on its own games, but does not have a policy against other sports betting.

On March 15, 2006, the New Jersey Attorney General's Office announced that it would subpoena Jones to testify about the alleged ring as soon as a grand jury convened. On May 8, Tocchet and Jones filed notices in New Jersey that they intend to sue the state for defamation, claiming that each lost business opportunities in the wake of the investigation. On May 25, 2007, Tocchet pleaded guilty to conspiracy and promoting gambling. New Jersey Attorney General Anne Milgram announced on August 17, 2007, that Tocchet had been sentenced to two years probation in exchange for his plea. He could have received up to five years in New Jersey state prison, but there is a presumption against incarceration for first-time offenders who plead guilty to such crimes.
