= The Firm (brand) =

Exercise brand

The FIRM
- Current owner: Gaiam (2005)
- Country: United States
- Introduced: 1979
- Previous owners: Meridian Films (1986); GoodTimes (2001)

The FIRM is a brand of exercise videos and equipment currently owned by Gaiam. First released in 1986, the video series is best known for popularizing a hybrid of aerobic exercise and weight training.

== History ==
In 1979, Anna Benson founded the exercise studio The Body Firm (later The FIRM Studios) in Charleston and Columbia, South Carolina. She recruited her sister Cynthia Benson and husband Mark Henriksen under the Meridian Films label to co-produce a series of exercise videos.

The first volume began production in 1983 and released in 1986 to pre-order and mail order sales. It quickly established itself as a competitor to personalities like Jane Fonda. The next two volumes featured actresses Janet Jones and Sandahl Bergman.

In 1994, BMG Video reissued the first three volumes along with a FIRM Parts anthology series for retail, alongside Time Life handling direct sales. Starting in 1998, Meridian Films entered a legal battle with multiple production staff over royalty payments. Meridian also sued BMG Video over exclusivity rights, such as Artisan Home Entertainment taking over the FIRM brand alongside BMG Video, and would eventually enter a distribution deal with GoodTimes Entertainment.

A judgment against Meridian led The FIRM to be sold in 2005 to GoodTimes, who were in turn purchased by Gaiam.

Anna Benson started Fitness Favorites, which became the official online store for the original videos after her death in 2009. After her death, Anna's son became owner of the Classic The FIRM and has released Anna's 'classic' DVDs from VHS format. The FIRM Studios was renamed The Flex Body/The FLEX in 2015 and is owned by Emily Welsh. In 2018, Anna Benson's Fitness Favorites renamed The FIRM (classic) to Anna L. Benson's The Body Firm. Now, Fitness Favorites is also streaming workouts.
