= Belt (surname) =

Belt is a surname, and may refer to:

- Bradley Belt, American businessman
- Brandon Belt (born 1988), American baseball player
- Christopher Belt, American politician from Illinois
- Clarence Belt (1890–1969), American racing driver
- David Belt (born 1967), American entrepreneur
- Dustin Belt (born 1987), American musician, producer and actor
- Elmer Belt (1893–1980), American urologist
- Francis Walter Belt (1862–1938), Australian naval commander, lawyer and explorer
- George Belt (1865–1930), British politician
- George Gordon Belt (1825–1869), American Confederate sympathizer who organized the Mason Henry Gang in California
- Harry H. Belt (1883–1950), American educator, lawyer and judge from Oregon
- Megan Belt (born 1997), English cricketer
- Peter Belt (1930–2017), British hi-fi inventor
- Philip Belt (1927–2015), American piano builder
- Silvester Belt (born 1997), Lithuanian singer and songwriter
- Thomas Belt (1832–1878), English geologist and naturalist
- William Belt (1826–1892), English barrister and antiquarian

== See also ==
- van den Belt
- Beit (surname)
- Bolt (surname)
