= Bait (disambiguation) =

Bait is any substance that is used for luring prey.

Bait, Baiting, or The Bait may also refer to:

- Fishing bait, bait used for fishing
- Baiting (blood sport), blood sport where animals are forced to fight each other

== Arts and entertainment ==
=== Film ===
- Bait (1950 film), a British crime film by Frank Richardson
- Bait (1954 film), an American noir film by Hugo Haas
- Bait (2000 film), an American-Canadian action comedy
- Bait 3D, a 2012 3D horror disaster film
- Bait, a 2014 British film directed by Dominic Brunt
- Bait (2019 film), a British drama film by Mark Jenkin
- The Bait (1921 film), a silent film
- The Bait (1973 film), a crime film
- The Bait (1995 film), a French film also known as L'Appât
- The Bait (2010 film), a Canadian film also known as L'Appât
- Balladyna (film), a 2000 Polish film also known as The Bait

=== Music ===
- Bait (soundtrack), the soundtrack to the 2000 film
- The Bait, a song by the band Electric Guest

=== Television ===
- "Bait" (CSI: Miami), an episode of the television series CSI: Miami
- "Bait" (The Unit), an episode of the television series The Unit
- Bait (TV series), a 2026 TV series created by Riz Ahmed

== Internet and cybersecurity ==
- Baiting (cybersecurity), cyberattack that relies on curiosity or greed of the victim
- Cyberbaiting, provoking teachers in order to post their reaction in online media
- Link bait, or clickbait, text or a thumbnail link to entice a "click", i.e., follow the link
- Pinoy baiting, internet posts to draw attention of Filipinos
- Rage-baiting, manipulative tactic of eliciting outrage with the goal of increasing internet traffic
- Scam baiting, a form of internet vigilantism

== Other uses ==
- Bait (novel), a 2009 novel by Sieds Jetze
- Race-baiting, inciting a manifestation of racial hatred
- Baiting crowd
- Goon baiting

== See also ==
- Bayt (disambiguation) (also spelled Bayt/Beit/Beth/Bet), meaning 'house' in various Semitic languages; part of many place-names
- Beit (disambiguation)
- Baite (disambiguation)
