= Biet =

Biet or BIET may refer to:

- Biet (mountain), a mountain in Switzerland
- Bapuji Institute of Engineering & Technology, Davangere, Karnataka, India
- Bundelkhand Institute of Engineering & Technology, Jhansi, Uttar Pradesh, India

== People with the name ==
- Christian Biet (1952–2020), French theatrical scholar
- Félix Biet (1838–1901), French missionary

== See also ==
- Beit
