= Baita =

Baita may refer to:

== Romania ==
=== Communes and villages ===
- Băița, Hunedoara, a commune in Hunedoara County
- Băița and Băița-Plai, villages in Nucet town, Bihor County
- Băița, a village in Gherla town, Cluj County
- Băița, a village in Tăuții-Măgherăuș town, Maramureș County
- Băița, a village in Lunca Commune, Mureș County
- Băița de sub Codru, a commune in Maramureș County

=== Other places ===
- Băița mine, open pit mine in Bihor County
- Băița (Fleț), tributary of the Fleț in Mureș County
- Băița, tributary of the Pârâul Galben in Gorj County
- Băița (Lăpuș), tributary of the Lăpuș in Maramureș County

== China ==
Within China, Baita or Bai Ta (Chinese: 白塔, lit. "White Tower") may refer to:

=== Places ===
- Baita District (白塔区), Liaoyang, Liaoning
- Baita railway station, railway station in Hohhot, Inner Mongolia on the Beijing-Baotou Line
- Hohhot Baita International Airport (呼和浩特白塔国际机场), serving Hohhot, Inner Mongolia
- Wanbu Huayanjing Pagoda, commonly referred to as Baita, located in Hohhot, Inner Mongolia
- White Dagoba, located in the Miaoying Temple in Beijing
- White Dagoba, located on Jade Flower island in Beihai Park in Beijing
- Zhakou White Pagoda in Hangzhou, Zhejiang

=== Towns ===
- Baita, Jiedong County, in Jiedong County, Guangdong
- Baita, Shahe, in Shahe City, Hebei
- Baita, Shenyang, in Dongling District, Shenyang, Liaoning
- Baita, Zibo, in Boshan District, Zibo, Shandong
- Baita, Xianju County, Xianju County, Zhejiang

=== Townships ===
- Baita Township, Luoyuan County, in Luoyuan County, Fujian
- Baita Manchu Ethnic Township (白塔满族乡), Xingcheng, Liaoning

== Other uses ==
- Baita (architecture) (plural: baite), small dwellings of the Italian Alps and Apennines
- Rabiu Baita (born 1984), Nigerian football player

== See also ==
- Baite (disambiguation)
