= Beit =

Beit may refer to:

- Beit (surname)
- Beit baronets
- Bet (letter), a letter of the Semitic abjad
- A component of Arabic placenames and Hebrew placenames, literally meaning 'house'
- Masada: Beit album by American jazz band Masada
- Bayt (poetry), a metrical unit in Arabic poetry and poetries which borrowed this word

== See also ==
- Bait (disambiguation)
- Bayt (disambiguation)
- Beyt (disambiguation)
