= Beltinge =

Suburb of Herne Bay, Kent, England

Coordinates: 51.372160°N 1.160070°E

- Location within Kent
- Population: 6,970
- OS grid reference: TR177680
- Civil parish: Herne and Broomfield
- District: City of Canterbury
- Shire county: Kent
- Region: South East
- Country: England
- Sovereign state: United Kingdom
- Post town: Herne Bay
- Postcode district: CT6
- Dialling code: 01227
- Police: Kent
- Fire: Kent
- Ambulance: South East Coast
- UK Parliament: Herne Bay and Sandwich

Beltinge /ˈbɛltɪndʒ/ is a low cliff-top suburb of Herne Bay in Kent, England.

== Demographics ==
Beltinge has a population of 6,970 as of 2024. The largest age group of the area is those between the age range of 60 to 79, making it a little more than a quarter of the entire population. The population has seen a slow decrees in recent years. There is a slightly higher proportion of men compared to women. 56% of residents identify as Christian, with others mainly identifying with no faith at 42%. Other religions sit at significant a minority in the area. The area is majority white at 93.3%, with the biggest minority groups being those of mixed heritage at 1.5% and Asian at 1.2%. Of the population, most were born in United Kingdom at 95.6% of people. The highest non British births are from Europe, with about 1.9%. Of the European births 1.7% are from the EU.

== Etymology ==
Formerly, the area was known as Beltings Forstal. This would be shortened into ‘Beltings.’ The suffix ‘ing’ or ‘inge’ means ‘people’ in Old English. ‘Belt’ is of English and Northern Germanic origin, it is an occupational name for a leather belt maker, or someone who wore a distinctive belt. It refers to low hills in Dutch. Later, the name would then later degenerate into Beltinge. The surname Belding may originate from Beltinge

== History ==
Beltinge was once a part of five boroughs within of Hearne: Stroud, Hawe, Hampton and Thornden. A chimney sweeper caught his arm in fish netting in 1823 while attempting to grab a weever from a net. The net had cut an artery along his arm, and though he continued work as normal, he was later admitted to Kent and Canterbury Hospital.

Friday in 1841, Peter Carr was assigned by his superior to take banknotes to Herne Bay. He did not return, causing a police inquiry. Speaking to the locals, police came to the home of Thomas Rose and Edward Maxted, who presented officers with a suspicious statement. A bloodied cloth was found, and a red stain was spotted on one sleeve. Carr’s hat was found blown away in a field in Beltinge, leading to the suspicion of a murder. Rose and Maxted were charged as the culprits of the crime. However, a magistrate sent an order for liberation of the two men when Peter Carr was suddenly found alive. Mr Carr told the office that he had got lost while heavily intoxicated.

Around an acre of land, including a public pathway, sunk significantly during 1894; smaller landslips were noted as happening previously from time to time. Due to a increasing population and new building developments in 1904, better sewage disposal provisions were proposed. A field owned by Mr Ramsay ignited into flames in the same year, 7 to 8 acres were burnt, reaching to the back of the Baptist Chapel before Herne Bay Fire Brigade arrived. By 1908, sewage works for Beltinge were under construction, however, faced differculty due to conflicting interests from Herne Bay and the Blean Rural District.

== Crime ==
Violent and sexual offences make up the majority crime of the area, with antisocial behaviour and arson coming in second and third. The area is relatively low crime, with 43.1 crimes per 1000 residents. However, offences related to possession of weapons are above the general national average.

== Geography ==
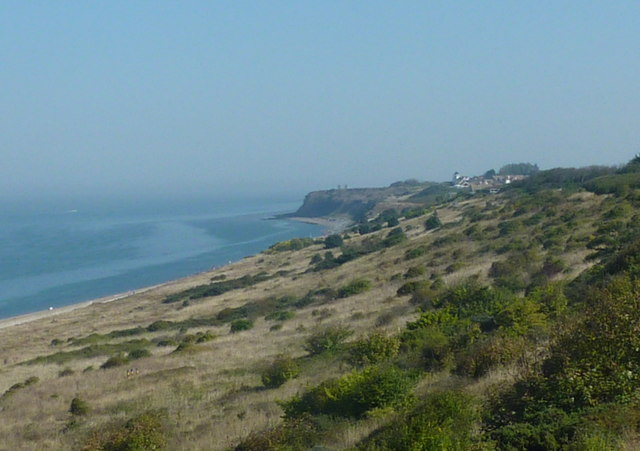
Beltinge cliffs

The Beltinge Cliffs are undeveloped grassy and north facing slopes along the coast. Along the cliff is exposed London Clay, Harwich, Upnor, and Thanet Formations, with recent brickearth drift deposits topping the formation. The cliffs have faced erosion due to soft consolidated deposits. The foreshore exposes the Beltinge Fish Beds. It is a key location for finding fossilised marine animals from between the Palascine to the early Ecocine. The beach is notable for shark teeth fossils with Striatolamia macrota and Carcharias hopei most commonly found. Glauconite, a mineral which typically forms in shallow water marine environments, causes a green look in the sediment.4th February 1953, severe storms hit and eroded the Beltinge Cliffs. It resulted in a landslide along the garden and cliff pathway of Miramar Hotel as the sea swept inland. The path fell down to 100 feet and the gardens by sea level. Households along Lismore Street were forced to evacuate, a local resident stating ‘Is just as if this beautiful piece of Kent was in a lift, which somebody suddenly decided to take down to the ground floor’ In the 2026 January draft for Canterbury District Biodiversity Strategy, Beltinge Cliffs was listed as coast and coastal hinterland landscape, and had a permeant grass cover. In climate change vulnerability, the cliffs were seen in ‘Most Vulnerable’ The small penny holes within the cliffs make nests for the small Sand Martin. Plant macro-fossils of the extinct Osmundites have been found.

Bridge at Bishopstone Glen from above

The Bishopstone Glen is a small valley that cuts through Beltinge and Bishopstone cliffs In heavy rainfall, a small stream will flow down into the ocean. The soft sandy clays causes instability. In the 1960s, the homes atop the Bishopstone Glen became at risk due to the growing instability. A seawall would be built beneath, and a line of wooden groynes was built to protect the walls and prevent more damage. In the early 1970s, top clay was graded down for a gentler incline along the Valley. The defences were extended in 1980.A landslide in 2014 resulted in two women and a dog to be trapped deep in mud and emergency services called to the scene. In the same year, a pipe burst along Gainsborough Drive and resulted in sewage to be released into Bishopstone Glen by Southern Water. The bridge was closed off to the public in 2021 after earthfall created from heavy rain caused collapse. The bomb disposal was called to the site in 2021 from a flare containing explosives and red phosphorus found by the local HM Coastguard.

== Governance ==
Sir Roger Gale is the current Member of Parliament (MP) for Herne Bay and Sandwich constituency. The Beltinge Ward is represented by two Conservative Party councillors, Ian Stockley and Jeanette Stockley.

== Listed Buildings ==
St Bartholomew's Church

Church of St Bartholomew

The Church of St Bartholomew is a grade II listed building on King Edward Avenue, Beltinge. It was designed by W. D. Caröe in 1908, with construction beginning in either 1913 or 1915. However, in the wake of World War I progress would come an immediate pause. It was consecrated in 1932 but was not fully completed. in the Architectural design, It has examples of gothic and folk-art inspired motifs. The church would gain listed status on 14 May 1976. In 2008, vandals would smash 73 of the panes on the windows, costing around 3’000 pounds in damages. Major restorations have been needed due to water damage overtime, with both exterior and exterior repairs needed.

Elliot House

Elliot House is a Grade II listed building along Reculver Road. Historically, The Elliot House has been known as the Passmore Railway Convalescent Home. The building has an Arts and Crafts style. It was built for railway workers in 1899. The home was the first of ten convalescent homes for railwaymen funded by John Passmore Edwards. Previously, the land sat adjacent to Passmore Friendly Society Home in early 1898, and Passmore had planned for it to be a nursing home. John Edwards Nichols, who acted as cashier of the London, Chatham & Dover Railway, wanted it to be a railway convalescent home for sick and injured workers. Passmore would eventually agree to Nichols' idea and partly fund the project, for which he gave 6,000 pounds.

In April 1899, the trust deed would be signed, and Nichols served as the chairman of the project. Many of his trustees were railway workers. The foundation stone was laid on 12 June 1899 by the Rt Hon Earl of Amherst. The architect for the project was Mr A Saxon Shell. Though originally intended for 50 beds, during development the number would double to 100. Despite the 6,000 pounds, far more was needed for the building costs. Trustees mortgaged their homes to raise the capital. On 8 June 1901, the opening ceremony was performed by Sir Henry Campbell Bannerman. In 1907, a new wing was built with 50 more beds and marked with the royal visit of Princess Louise, Duchess of Argyll. In World War I, the building would serve as a military hospital.

In 1970, the building was forced into closure and turned into a nursing home. By 1981, it was renamed Heronswood and then later to Elliott House. In 2021, after inspection by the Care Quality Commission inspectors, the care home was forced to close down. The building was then brought by Grifo Developments, who holds current ownership and has plans to turn the building into flats.

== See also ==
- Saxon Shore Way
