= Baite =

Baite may refer to:

- Baite (architecture) (singular: baita), small dwellings of the central and western Alps
- Báite (English: The Drowned), a 2025 Irish-language film noir film
- Thangso Baite (born 1953), an Indian politician
- Tunkhopum Baite (1929–1967), a Zo nationalist leader

== See also ==
- Baita (disambiguation)
- Bait (disambiguation)
- Bayt (disambiguation), meaning 'house' in various Semitic languages; part of many place-names (with a suffix, often spelled "Beyt-e" or "Baité")
