= Beyt =

== Beyt ==
Beyt means a house (بيت) or home in Arabic. Beyt is also a growing real estate market place in Kuwait and the MENA region, which allows real estate agencies and users to search and upload their listings for free.

== People ==
- Hassan Beyt Saeed (born 1990), Iranian football player
- Mary Beyt (born 1959), American abstract painter

== See also ==
- Beit
