= Shilandai station =

Metro station in Hohhot, China

Shilandai 什兰岱站
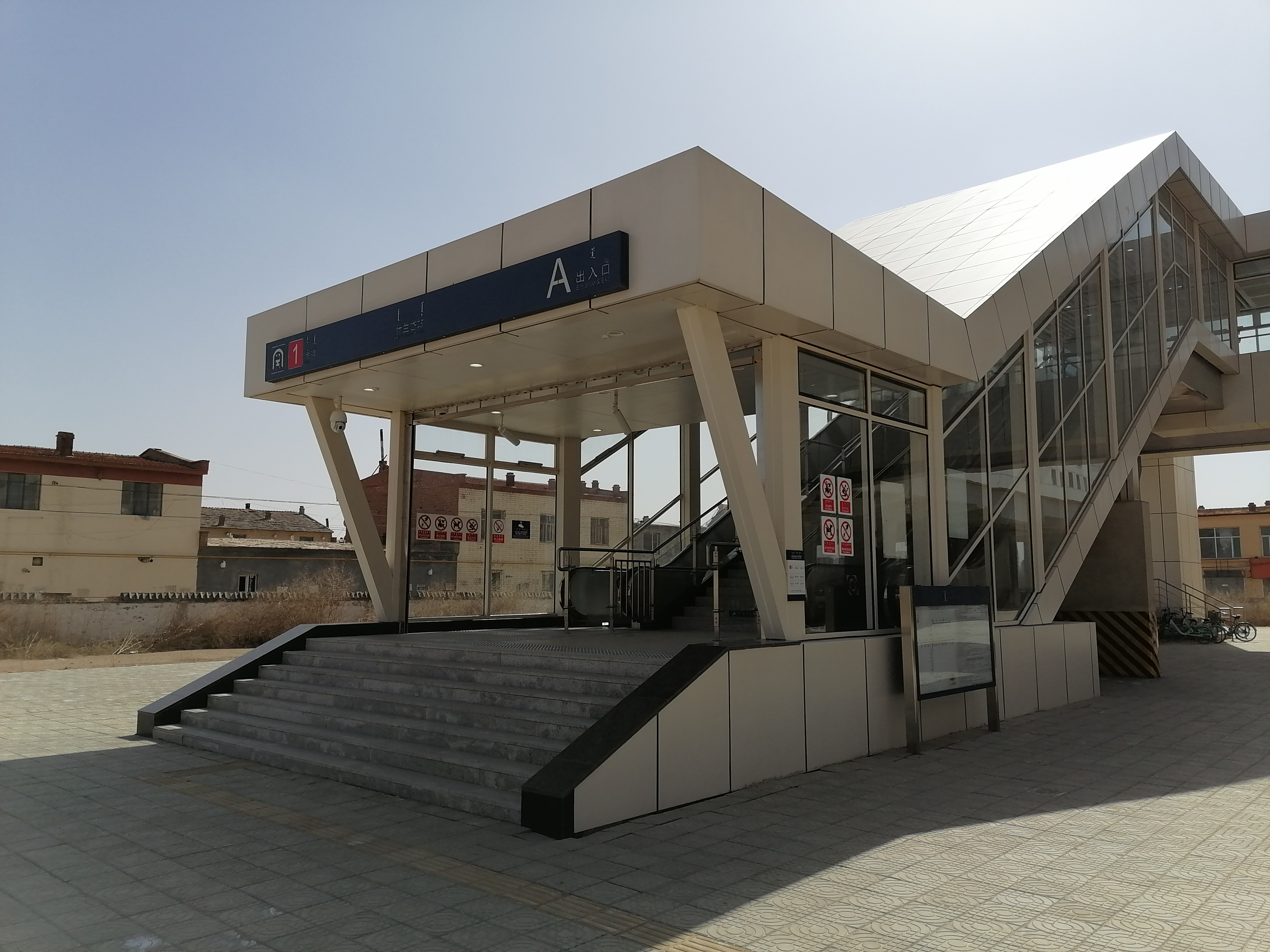
- ᠰᠢᠯᠠᠷᠳᠠᠢ

General information
- Location: Saihan District, Hohhot, Inner Mongolia, China
- Coordinates: 40.850771°N 111.793835°E
- Line: Line 1

History
- Opened: 29 December 2019; 6 years ago

Services
Preceding station	Hohhot Metro	Following station
Houbutaqi towards Yili Health Valley	Line 1	Baita West towards Bayan (Airport)
Location

Shilandai Station (Chinese: 什兰岱站) is a station on Line 1 of the Hohhot Metro. It opened on 29 December 2019. Shilandai is the first of three overground stations at Line 1's eastern terminus.
