= Saihan, Hohhot =

Saihan 赛罕区 • ᠰᠠᠶᠢᠬᠠᠨ ᠲᠣᠭᠣᠷᠢᠭ
- District
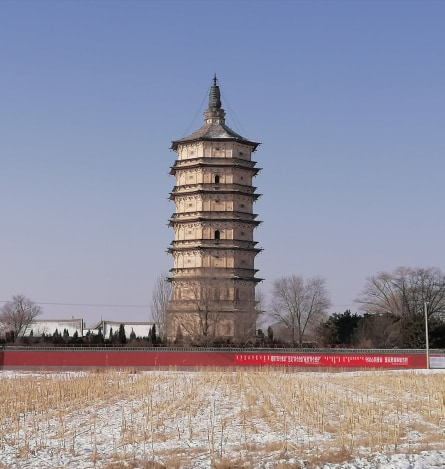
- Wanbu Huayanjing Pagoda, an important cultural site in the district

- Location within Inner Mongolia Location within China
- Coordinates: 40°47′32″N 111°42′07″E
- Country: China
- Region: Inner Mongolia
- Prefecture-level city: Hohhot
- District seat: Ju Ud Road Subdistrict

Area
  - Total: 1,025.2 km^{2} (395.8 sq mi)
- Elevation: 1,047 m (3,435 ft)

Population (2020)
  - Total: 885,321
  - Density: 863.56/km^{2} (2,236.6/sq mi)
- Time zone: UTC+8 (China Standard)
- Website: www.saihan.gov.cn

Saihan, Hohhot

Chinese name
- Simplified Chinese: 赛罕区
- Traditional Chinese: 賽罕區
Transcriptions
Standard Mandarin
- Hanyu Pinyin: Sàihǎn Qū

Mongolian name
- Mongolian Cyrillic: Сайхан дугараг
- Mongolian script: ᠰᠠᠶᠢᠬᠠᠨ ᠲᠣᠭᠣᠷᠢᠭ
Transcriptions
- SASM/GNC: Sayiqan toɣoriɣ

Saihan District (Mongolian: ᠰᠠᠶᠢᠬᠠᠨ ᠲᠣᠭᠣᠷᠢᠭ, Chinese: 赛罕区) is one of the four districts of the prefecture-level city of Hohhot, the capital of Inner Mongolia Autonomous Region, China.

It was established in July 1999 and is located in the southeast of the city center and covers a total area of 1025.2 square kilometres, bordering Xincheng District to the north, Yuquan District to the west, Horinger County to the south, and the Ulanqab counties of Liangcheng and Zhuozi to the east. The population of the district is 572,000, 383,000 of whom live in the urban core; the remaining population live in the vast agricultural area included within the district.

The district houses the cities seat of government, and a number of important cultural sites, including the nationally protected Wanbu Huayanjing Pagoda and Baita railway station. It also houses the international airport for Hohhot, Hohhot Baita International Airport and Hohhot East railway station; one of two major railway stations in the city. The HQ for the Hohhot Metro is located near the Houbutaqi station within the district.

== Administrative divisions ==
Saihan District is made up of 8 subdistricts and 3 towns.

Name	Simplified Chinese	Hanyu Pinyin	Mongolian (Hudum Script)	Mongolian (Cyrillic)	Administrative division code
Subdistricts
Renmin Road Subdistrict	人民路街道	Rénmínlù Jiēdào	ᠠᠷᠠᠳ ᠵᠠᠮ ᠤᠨ ᠵᠡᠭᠡᠯᠢ ᠭᠤᠳᠤᠮᠵᠢ	Ард замын зээл гудамж	150105001
University West Road Subdistrict	大学西路街道	Dàxuéxīlù Jiēdào	ᠶᠡᠬᠡ ᠰᠤᠷᠭᠠᠭᠤᠯᠢ ᠶᠢᠨ ᠪᠠᠷᠠᠭᠤᠨ ᠵᠠᠮ ᠤᠨ ᠵᠡᠭᠡᠯᠢ ᠭᠤᠳᠤᠮᠵᠢ	Их сургуулийн баруун замын зээл гудамж	150105002
Ulanqab East Road Subdistrict	乌兰察布东路街道	Wūlánchábùdōnglù Jiēdào	ᠤᠯᠠᠭᠠᠨᠴᠠᠪ ᠵᠡᠭᠦᠨ ᠵᠠᠮ ᠤᠨ ᠵᠡᠭᠡᠯᠢ ᠭᠤᠳᠤᠮᠵᠢ	Улаанцав зүүн замын зээл гудамж	150105003
University East Road Subdistrict	大学东路街道	Dàxuédōnglù Jiēdào	ᠶᠡᠬᠡ ᠰᠤᠷᠭᠠᠭᠤᠯᠢ ᠵᠠᠮ ᠤᠨ ᠵᠡᠭᠦᠨ ᠵᠡᠭᠡᠯᠢ ᠭᠤᠳᠤᠮᠵᠢ		150105004
Zhongzhuan Road Subdistrict	中专路街道	Zhōngzhuānlù Jiēdào	ᠵᠦᠩ ᠵᠤᠸᠠᠨ ᠵᠠᠮ ᠤᠨ ᠵᠡᠭᠡᠯᠢ ᠭᠤᠳᠤᠮᠵᠢ	Жүн зуан замын зээл гудамж	150105005
Ju Ud Road Subdistrict	昭乌达路街道	Zhāowūdálù Jiēdào	ᠵᠤᠤ ᠤᠳᠠ ᠵᠠᠮ ᠤᠨ ᠵᠡᠭᠡᠯᠢ ᠭᠤᠳᠤᠮᠵᠢ	Жуу уд замын зээл гудамж	150105006
Bayan Subdistrict	巴彦街道	Bāyàn Jiēdào	ᠪᠠᠶᠠᠨ ᠵᠡᠭᠡᠯᠢ ᠭᠤᠳᠤᠮᠵᠢ	Баян зээл гудамж	150105006
Chilechuan Road Subdistrict (Qelger Tal Road Subdistrict)	敕勒川路街道	Chìlèchuānlù Jiēdào	ᠴᠡᠯᠭᠡᠷ ᠲᠠᠯ᠎ᠠ ᠵᠠᠮ ᠤᠨ ᠵᠡᠭᠡᠯᠢ ᠭᠤᠳᠤᠮᠵᠢ	Цэлгэр тал замын зээл гудамж	150105008
Towns
Yulin Town	榆林镇	Yúlín Zhèn	ᠢᠦᠢ ᠯᠢᠨ ᠪᠠᠯᠭᠠᠰᠤ	Юй лин балгас	150105101
Hua Huxu Town	黄合少镇	Huánghéshǎo Zhèn	ᠬᠤᠸᠠᠬᠤᠰᠢᠭᠤ ᠪᠠᠯᠭᠠᠰᠤ	Хуахашуу балгас	150105103
Jinhe Town	金河镇	Jīnhé Zhèn	ᠵᠢᠨ ᠾᠧ ᠪᠠᠯᠭᠠᠰᠤ	Гийн ге балгас	150105104

Other:

- Jinqiao Economic-Technological Development Area (金桥经济技术开发区, ᠵᠢᠨ ᠴᠢᠶᠣᠤ ᠠᠵᠤ ᠠᠬᠤᠢ ᠶᠢᠨ ᠮᠡᠷᠭᠡᠵᠢᠯ ᠦᠨ ᠨᠡᠭᠡᠭᠡᠯᠲᠡ ᠶᠢᠨ ᠲᠣᠭᠣᠷᠢᠭ)

== Transport ==
=== Airports ===
Hohhot Baita International Airport is located in Saihan District, and takes its name from the nearby Wanbu Huayanjing Pagoda located in the rural east of the district.

=== Metro ===
Saihan is currently served by two lines and seven stations of the Hohhot Metro.

- 1 - Arts College, Dongyinglu, Inner Mongolia Exhibition Hall, Inner Mongolia Museum, City Government, Houbutaqi, Shilandai, Baita West HET, Bayan (Airport) HET
- 2 - Shuaijiaying, Lamaying, A'ershanlu
