= Houbutaqi station =

Metro station in Hohhot, China

Houbutaqi 后不塔气站
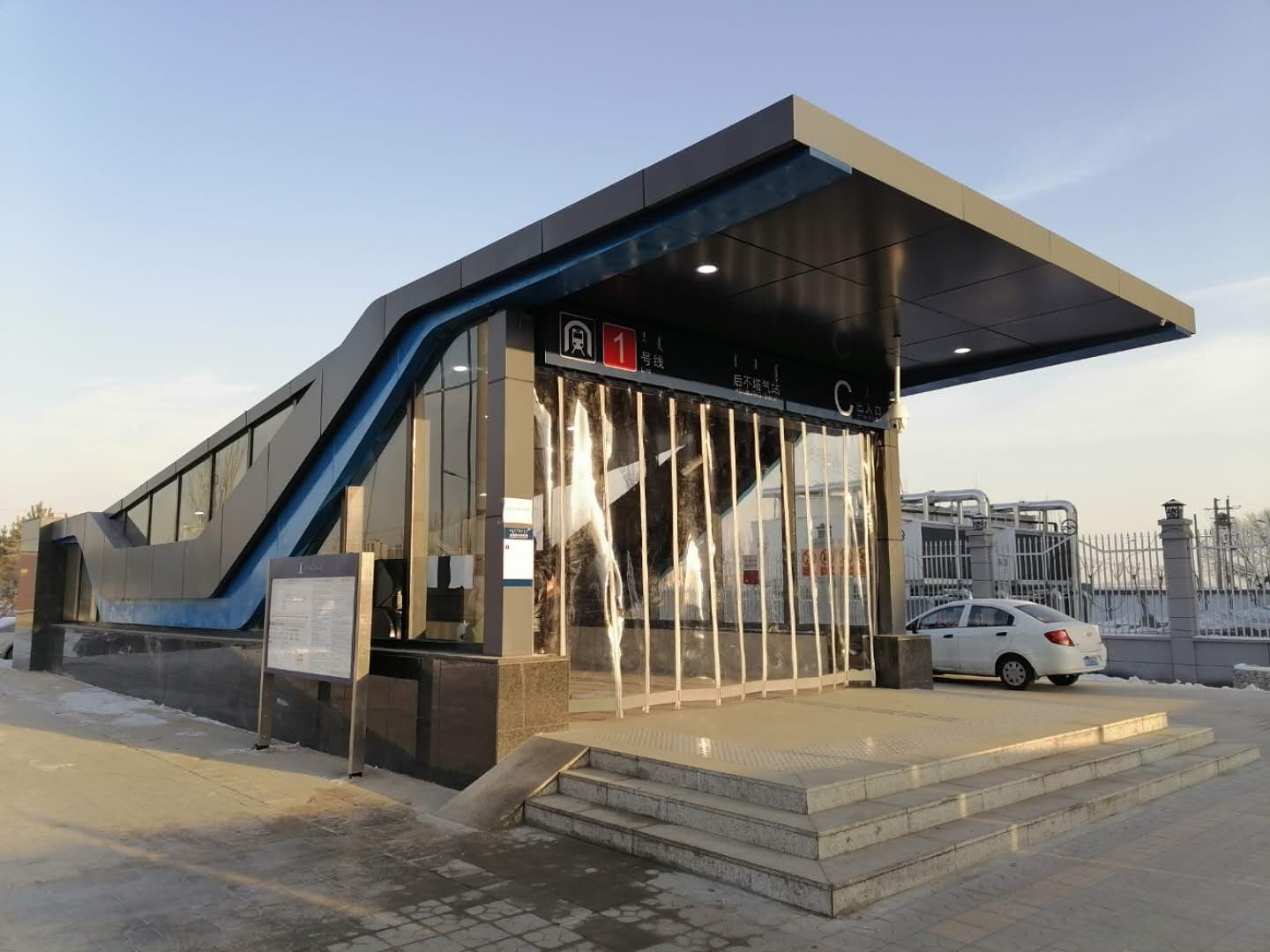
- ᠬᠣᠢᠲᠤ ᠪᠤᠲᠠᠴᠢ

General information
- Location: Saihan District, Hohhot, Inner Mongolia, China
- Coordinates: 40.847197°N 111.776417°E
- Line: Line 1

History
- Opened: 29 December 2019; 6 years ago

Services
Preceding station	Hohhot Metro	Following station
Hohhot East Railway Station towards Yili Health Valley	Line 1	Shilandai towards Bayan (Airport)
Location

Houbutaqi Station (Chinese: 后不塔气站) is a station on Line 1 of the Hohhot Metro. It opened on 29 December 2019.

Houbutaqi Station is named after the nearby Houbutaqi Village. The village was established during the Qing Dynasty and is named after the local bushes. Houbutaqi is the final subterranean station eastbound, with trains surfacing between Houbutaqi and Shilandai station.
