= Renmin Road Subdistrict, Hohhot =

Renmin Road Subdistrict 人民路街道 • ᠠᠷᠠᠳ ᠵᠠᠮ ᠤᠨ ᠵᠡᠭᠡᠯᠢ ᠭᠤᠳᠤᠮᠵᠢ
- Subdistrict
- Location in Inner Mongolia
- Coordinates: 40°48′11″N 111°40′41″E
- Country: China
- Autonomous region: Inner Mongolia
- Prefecture-level city: Hohhot
- District: Saihan District
- Time zone: UTC+8 (China Standard Time)

Renmin Road Subdistrict (Chinese: 人民路街道; pinyin: Rénmínlù Jiēdào; Mongolian: ᠠᠷᠠᠳ ᠵᠠᠮ ᠤᠨ ᠵᠡᠭᠡᠯᠢ ᠭᠤᠳᠤᠮᠵᠢ arad ǰam-un ǰegeli ɣudumǰi) is a subdistrict situated in Saihan District, Hohhot, Inner Mongolia, China. As of 2020, it administers the following nine residential neighborhoods:

- Jiankang Community (健康社区)
- Dibei Community (地北社区)
- Zhinong Community (支农社区)
- Shandan Community (山丹社区)
- Shuiwen Community (水文社区)
- Shiqi Community (仕奇社区)
- Xingkang Community (兴康社区)
- Dianlijiayuan Community (电力家园社区)
- Fuxing Community (富兴社区)

== See also ==
- List of township-level divisions of Inner Mongolia
