= Baita railway station =

Railway station in Hohhot, China

Coordinates: 40.8697°N 111.8455°E

Baita 白塔站

General information
- Location: Saihan District, Hohhot, Inner Mongolia; China
- Line(s): Beijing-Baotou railway

Other information
- Station code: BTA

History
- Opened: 1923

Baita railway station (Chinese: 白塔站) is a former passenger station of Jingbao Railway in Inner Mongolia. Currently, Baita is used primarily as a freight station. In 2014, the station was announced as a 'Key Cultural Relic' of Inner Mongolia. In 2019, this certification was upgraded to that of a Major Historical and Cultural Site Protected at the National Level.

The station name is derived from the nearby Baita pagoda.

== See also ==
- List of stations on Jingbao railway
