= Baiting crowd =

Baiting crowd is a form of collective aggression; this is a situation where a group of individuals unify their aggression, while they may not even know each other, towards another individual or group.

== Deindividuation ==
It is a typical situation where a person is about to jump from a high building while there are people standing below, whereas some people begin to shout that the person has to jump off.

Leon Mann (born 12 December 1937) is an Australian psychologist. He is currently Director of the Research Leadership Program and coordinator of the University of Melbourne's Mentoring Program for Research Leaders.

In the late 20th century, Leon Mann became interested in the idea of deindividuation. More specifically, he wanted to investigate how aggression of a group of people towards another individual or group, could influence one’s own behaviour. In the attempt to investigate this matter, Mann analysed 166 cases of suicide or suicide attempt, in which in 21 cases a crowd was involved. He wanted to find out when collective aggression towards an individual, who was about to commit suicide (e.g. encouraging to jump of a large building), would cause an outsider to join the baiting crowd in this process of deindividuation. In ten of these 21 cases several factors may have led to deindividuation where baiting occurred.

He found out that when the crowd was small and during daytime, people would usually not shout that the person should jump. However, when the crowd was large and it was late at night it caused people to be anonymous, therefore they would more quickly shout that the person had to jump from the building.

This is caused through deindividuation which is a process whereby people lose their sense of socialized individual identity and often show unsocialized and even antisocial behavior. In this situation people often blur their normal behaviors, leading to an increase in impulsive and deviant behavior. One becomes less an individual and more part of the mass.

Deindividuation theory predicts that under the cover of anonymity, crowd members will be more aggressive than when identifiable. Emergent norm theory predicts that the most aggressive behavior will occur when an aggressive norm prevails in a crowd in which participants are identifiable to each other.

== Influencing factors ==
In his article "The Baiting Crowd in Episodes of Threatened Suicide", Leon Mann classified several factors that influence the baiting crowd.

=== Four anonymity factors that will reinforce the baiting crowd ===
==== Crowd size ====
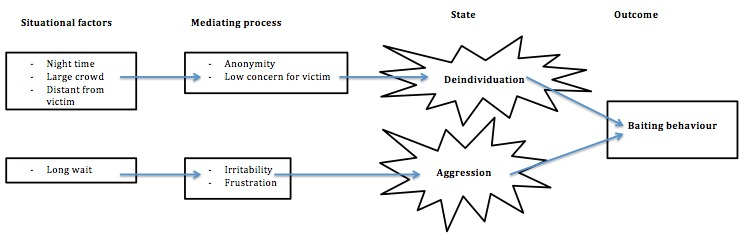
Deinviduation model; how factors influence the baiting crowd

Leon Mann's research shows that a sense of anonymity increases sharply as a group grows, resulting in a reduced self-awareness. Moreover, in larger groups the chances increase of a person in the crowd encouraging the victim's act. This encouragement could form a model for the rest of the group to follow.

==== Cover of darkness ====
The degree of lighting appears to be a factor that also plays a part in some of the cases. Because little lighting strengthens anonymity, most incidents occur when it is dark outside.

==== Physical distance between victim and crowd ====
An increase in the physical distance between the observer and the victim increases the dehumanization of the observer in relation to the victim. Because the victim is too far away from the observer, the victim can no longer be recognized or heard, which can result in him being seen less as a person.

==== Duration of episode ====
When a crowd has to wait a long time before something happens, this crowd can get bored or annoyed. A possible explanation behind this is that the crowd gets the feeling that the situation is a big act, which leads to increased frustrations. They may wonder whether the person really wants to commit suicide or he is just in it to get some publicity.

=== Furthermore he classified 3 other factors which may influence the baiting crowd ===
==== Aversive temperature ====
Most cases of baiting crowd appear in the hottest months of the year, an increase in temperature causes an increase in frustrations among the crowd. Those frustrations lead to less patience and the raise of deindividualisation.

==== The city ====
In large cities baiting appears to be more common than in smaller cities or villages. This may be because a large city leads to more anonymity. Furthermore, there is often a large amount of high buildings that are easily available to the person.

==== Dehumanisation of the victim ====
A crowd can see the victim as a crazy person. They do not see someone with the need to commit suicide as a fellow human being, but view them as inferior. This feeling can be enhanced when a form of discrimination takes place.

== Critique ==
Leon Mann states that through the presence of a crowd and the loss of individuality (deindividuation) crowd baiting is taking place. He supports this phenomenon by relying on his 21 single case studies using the archival research method. Although Mann discovered the phenomenon, he himself states that “Because of the sampling method, the small number of cases, and the nature of the data (journalistic accounts), no strong conclusions can be drawn, but leads for further research can be adduced”. Many more studies will be required to discover the different facets of crowd baiting such as “Who are the baiters and their individual circumstances and characteristics?” and “What are the conditions for crowd members to encourage the victim to jump?”

== See also ==
- Online disinhibition effect
- Incitement
- Lynching
- Pogrom
- Riot
