= Belding (surname) =

Belding is a surname. Notable people with the surname include:

- Elizabeth Belding, American engineer
- John Belding (1650–1713), American settler
- Lester Belding (1900–1965), American athlete and coach
- Lyman Belding (1829–1917), American ornithologist
