= Christian Biet =

French theatrical scholar (1952–2020)

- Born: 12 May 1952; Paris, France
- Died: 13 July 2020 (aged 68); Poitiers, France
- Occupation: Professor

Christian Biet (12 May 1952 – 13 July 2020) was a French professor of theatrical studies. His main work focused on the aesthetics of theatre.

== Biography ==
Biet was born into a family of teachers. After his secondary studies and khâgne at the Lycée Condorcet, he worked as an auditor at the École normale supérieure de Saint-Cloud. Alongside his close friends, Jean-Luc Rispali and Jean-Paul Brighelli, Biet succeeded with his aggregation in 1975. In 1982, they published a series of historical works for Lagarde et Michard. They collaborated on other works regarding Alexandre Dumas and surrealism.

After completing his education, Biet worked as a lecturer at Paris Nanterre University before becoming a theatre professor in 1986. He supervised 42 theses at Paris Nanterre. He also served as the director of the History and Arts Representation unit at the University. He became a member of the Institut Universitaire de France in 2006, and started working for Théâtre/Public in 2007.

Christian Biet died in a traffic collision in Poitiers on 13 July 2020 at the age of 68.

== Publications ==
=== Author ===
- XVIe - XVII e siècles (1982)
- XVIIe-XVIIIe siècles (1982)
- XIXe siècle (1982)
- Les miroirs du Soleil : Littératures et classicisme au siècle de Louis XIV, coll. « Découvertes Gallimard » (nº 58), série Littératures (1989); new edition in 2000 under the title Les miroirs du Soleil : Le roi Louis XIV et ses artistes
- Œdipe en monarchie, tragédie et théorie juridique à l’âge classique (1994)
- La Médecine au temps de Molière (1995)
- Les tragédies de Racine (1995)
- Moi, Pierre Corneille, coll. « Découvertes Gallimard » (nº 484), série Littératures. (2005)
- Qu'est-ce que le théâtre ? (2006)
- Le théâtre, la violence et les arts en Europe (XVIè-XVIIè) (2011)

=== Editor ===
- Œdipe (1999)
- Une histoire du spectacle militant; théâtre et cinéma militants, 1966-1981 (2007)
- Performance : expérimentation et théorie du théâtre aux USA (2008)
- Le théâtre français du XVIIe siècle : histoire, textes choisis, mises en scène (2009)
- Tragédies et récits de martyres en France : fin XVIe-début XVIIe siècle (2012)
- La question du répertoire au théâtre (2018)

=== Prefaces ===
- Le mythe de l'authenticité, lectures, interprétations, dramaturgies de Britannicus de Jean Racine en France, 1669-2004 by Karel Vanhaesebrouck (2006)
- Mythes et mythologies dans la littérature française by Pierre Albouy (2012)

=== Articles ===
Christian Biet published numerous articles in Communications, Droit et Société, Le Fablier, Revue des Amis de Jean de La Fontaine, Les Cahiers du GRIF, Littératures classiques, Théâtre/Public, and others.
