= HaBayit HaLeumi =

Israeli organization

HaBayit HaLeumi (Hebrew: הבית הלאומי, The National Home) is an organization based in Israel dedicated to stopping former Prime Minister Ariel Sharon's disengagement plan. The organization was behind civil disobedience protesting the disengagement plan of Sharon.

On Monday, May 16, 2005, a nonviolent protest was held throughout the country, with the protesters blocking major traffic arteries throughout Israel. The protest was sponsored by HaBayit HaLeumi, and was hailed by them as a success, with over 400 protesters arrested, half of them juveniles. Over 40 intersections throughout the country were blocked, including:

- The entrance to Jerusalem
- Bar Ilan/Shmuel Hanavi junction in Jerusalem
- Sultan's Pool junction outside the Old City of Jerusalem
- Geha Highway
- Golumb St. corner of Begin Blvd. in Jerusalem

The organization draws upon the experience of Moshe Feiglin and Zo Artzeinu, the organization that led mass protests against the 1992 Oslo Accords.

== Sources ==
- "פעילי ימין חסמו כבישים וצמתים בכל הארץ". Ynet (in Hebrew). 16 May 2005.
