= Francis Walter Belt =

Australian naval commander

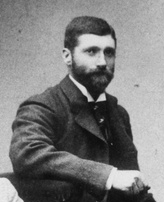
F. W. Belt, 1894

Francis Walter Belt (30 April 1862 – 21 August 1938) was an Australian naval commander, lawyer, explorer, and big game hunter. Born in Adelaide, he attended the Collegiate School of St Peter and clerked in the offices of his father, a barrister, and was admitted barrister and solicitor in 1884. He took part in the 1894 Horn Scientific Expedition to Central Australia, financed by his brother-in-law William A. Horn. He served two wars: first as a trooper in the South African War from 1900 to 1901, and later during World War I, where he served first as a lieutenant Royal Naval Volunteer Reserve in England, then lieutenant-commander and finally commander in the Royal Naval Division. He was wounded during the war and received the Distinguished Service Order from the United Kingdom as well as the Russian Order of Saint Anna and Order of Saint Stanislaus. He died in Montreux, Switzerland, at the age of 76.
