= Bradley Belt =

American businessman and government official

Bradley D. Belt
- Occupation: Mayor of Kiawah Island
- Board member of: Palisades Capital, CEO

Bradley Belt is an American businessman. He is the CEO of Palisades Capital and a former managing director of the Milken Institute. He is vice chairman of Orchard Global Asset Management. In 2024, he was elected mayor of Kiawah Island.

He is the former executive director of the Pension Benefit Guaranty Corporation (PBGC) in the US. He was appointed by President George W. Bush to replace Steven Kandarian and later resigned on March 23, 2006. Eisenhower Fellowships selected Belt as a USA Eisenhower Fellow in 1997. Belt was named one of SmartMoney's "Power 30" in finance and one of Workforce magazine's "10 Most Forward-Thinking Leaders in Workforce Management".

== Education ==
He received a J.D. from Georgetown University and a B.S. from the University of Nebraska.

== Career ==
Belt has extensive executive management, operations, finance and policy experience in the private, public and non-profit sectors. His previous government service includes senior staff positions with the Securities Exchange Commission and the U.S. Senate, including as counsel to the Committee on Banking, Housing and Urban Affairs. In the private sector, he has been an executive of a financial services and technology company, and managing director of merchant banking and public affairs strategy firms. He also served as senior vice president of the bipartisan Center for Strategic and International Studies.

Belt became the executive direction of PBGC in April 2004. The PBGC was set up by the Employee Retirement Income Security Act (ERISA) of 1974, to guarantee defined benefit pension plan benefits for plan sponsors that become insolvent when there are too few pension plan assets to fully pay all insured pension benefits. As the chief executive officer of PBGC, Belt oversaw the U.S. government corporation that insures the pension benefits of private sector workers and retirees. He also played a leading role in the historic overhaul of U.S. pension rules, giving millions of Americans a better chance of getting the retirement benefits they earned. The bill also created added incentives for greater worker participation in 401(K)s. During Belt's tenure as director, the PBGC took on extensive liabilities from terminated pension plans, including United Air Lines, and became massively underfunded. On March 23, 2006 he announced his intention to resign effective May 2006.

He previously served as senior vice president of CSIS, responsible for policy development, corporate strategy, and oversight of the Center's international finance, information technology, and domestic policy initiatives.

Belt has served in senior roles at the Securities Exchange Commission, the United States Senate Committee on Banking, Housing and Urban Affairs, and as a senior vice president of the Center for Strategic and International Studies. He was named by SmartMoney as one of its Power 30 in finance and by Workforce magazine as one of its "10 Most Forward-Thinking Leaders in Workforce Management."

Belt joined the Milken Institute from Palisades Capital, a boutique restructuring advisory and investment firm he co-founded. Prior to establishing Palisades, he served in the Bush administration as the executive director of the Pension Benefit Guaranty Corp. As the chief executive officer of the PBGC, Belt was responsible for the operations and management of a $50 billion investment portfolio. Under his leadership, PBGC restructured its operations, adopted a new liability-driven investment policy, implemented performance-based human capital management strategies, established new risk management and internal control systems, and oversaw the resolution of many of the agency's largest and most complex financial settlements. Belt had been previously appointed by President Bush to the Social Security Advisory Board, and he helped shape and communicate administration policy on pension and retirement security issues.

Belt is CEO of Palisades Capital, as well as a member of the Board of Trustees of the Protestant Episcopal Cathedral Foundation (the oversight board for Washington National Cathedral, and St. Albans, Cathedral, and Beauvoir schools), the Board of Directors of Zurich American Life Insurance Company, and the Advisory Board of Norfolk Markets. He is also a senior fellow with the McDonough School of Business (Georgetown).

An Eisenhower Fellow, Belt completed an executive management program at the Kennedy School at Harvard University, received his Juris Doctor degree from Georgetown and obtained his undergraduate degree in business administration from the University of Nebraska. He is a member of the New York, District of Columbia, and U.S. Supreme Court bars."

Bradley Belt is senior managing director of the Milken Institute, heading its Washington office and co-chairing the Center for Financial Markets. He is a co-founder of Palisades Capital Management LLC, a restructuring advisory and investment firm that focuses on pensions, insurance and financial services. Previously, he was the CEO of the Pension Benefit Guaranty Corp., a federally chartered corporation that insures the defined-benefit plans of private employers, overseeing a $60 billion investment portfolio. Belt has extensive experience in executive management, operations, finance and policy development in the private, public and nonprofit sectors. He has held senior staff positions at the Securities and Exchange Commission and the U.S. Senate and serves on several corporate and nonprofit boards. Belt was named one of SmartMoney's "Power 30" in finance and one of Workforce magazine's "10 Most Forward-Thinking Leaders in Workforce Management." He received a J.D. from Georgetown University and a B.S. from the University of Nebraska. -- Bradley Belt is one of the nation’s leading experts on retirement security and its impact on financial markets and the economy. He has had a distinguished career in both the public and private sectors. He served under President George W. Bush as the chief executive officer of Pension Benefit Guaranty Corporation (PBGC), where he oversaw a $60 billion investment portfolio and helped shape the administration’s retirement security policy. He was also appointed by the president to the Social Security Advisory Board and previously served in senior staff positions in Congress as counsel to the Senate Banking Committee and at the Securities and Exchange Commission.

Exclusively represented by Leading Authorities speakers bureau, Belt discusses broad trends in pension policy – and the associated opportunities and risks – and the fragility of retirement security structures, including the long-term deficit in Social Security, the erosion of defined-benefit plans, and the shifting of investment risks in defined-contribution plans. With gravity and good humor, he looks at demographics, financial markets, and the economy to help organizations assess risk and develop a strategy for managing the retirement plans they offer. -- Belt is currently Vice Chairman of Orchard Global Asset Management.
