= Van den Belt =

Van den Belt is a surname. Notable people with the surname include:

- Herman van den Belt (born 1970), Dutch basketball coach
- Jacob van den Belt (born 1981), Dutch footballer
- Thomas van den Belt (born 2001), Dutch footballer
