= Bet (letter) =

Second letter of many Semitic alphabets

← Aleph Bet Gimel →
- Phoenician: 𐤁
- Hebrew: ב
- Samaritan: ࠁ
- Aramaic: 𐡁
- Syriac: ܒ
- Nabataean: 𐢃𐢂
- Arabic: ب
- South Arabian: 𐩨
- Geʽez: በ
- North Arabian: 𐪈
- Ugaritic: 𐎁
- Phonemic representation: b, (v)
- Position in alphabet: 2
- Numerical value: 2

Alphabetic derivatives of the Phoenician
- Greek: Β
- Latin: B
- Cyrillic: В, Б

Bet, Beth, Beh, or Vet is the second letter of the Semitic abjads, including Phoenician bēt 𐤁, Hebrew bēt ב, Aramaic bēṯ 𐡁, Syriac bēṯ ܒ and Arabic bāʾ ب. It is also related to the Ancient North Arabian 𐪈, South Arabian 𐩨, and Ge'ez በ. Its sound value is the voiced bilabial stop ⟨b⟩ or the voiced labiodental fricative ⟨v⟩.

The letter's name means "house" in various Semitic languages (Arabic bayt, Akkadian bītu, bētu, Hebrew: bayīṯ, Phoenician bēt etc.; ultimately all from Proto-Semitic *bayt-), and appears to derive from an Egyptian hieroglyph of a house by acrophony.

O1

The Phoenician letter gave rise to, among others, the Greek beta (Β, β), Latin B (B, b) and Cyrillic Be (Б, б) and Ve (В, в), and also the Armenian letter Ben (Բ, բ).

== Origin ==
The name bet is derived from the West Semitic word for "house" (as in Hebrew: בַּיִת, romanized: bayt), and the shape of the letter derives from a Proto-Sinaitic glyph that may have been based on the Egyptian hieroglyph Pr

O1

, which depicts a house.

Hieroglyph	Proto-Sinaitic	Phoenician	Paleo-Hebrew
O1		Bet	

== Arabic bāʾ ==
Bāʾ باء, Bayt
- ب

Usage
- Writing system: Arabic script
- Type: Abjad
- Language of origin: Arabic language
- Sound values: b
- Alphabetical position: 2

History
- Development: 𐤁: 𐡁; 𐢂 ,𐢃; ٮ; ب

Other
- Writing direction: Right-to-left

The Arabic letter ب is named بَاءْ bāʾ (bāʔ). It is written in several ways depending on its position in the word

Position in word:	Isolated	Final	Medial	Initial
Glyph form: (Help)	ب	ـب	ـبـ	بـ

The letter normally renders /b/ sound, except in some names and loanwords where it can also render /p/, often Arabized as /b/, as in بَرْسِيلْ (Persil). For /p/, it may be used interchangeably with the Persian letter پ - pe (with 3 dots) in this case.

=== Interpretation of ب ===
Bāʾ is the first letter of the Quran ^{[ 1:1]}, the first letter of Basmala. The letter bāʾ as a prefix may function as a preposition meaning "by" or "with". Some tafsirs interpreted the positioning of bāʾ as the opener of the Qur'an with "by My (God's) cause (all is present and happen)".

=== Persian variant ===
A variant of bāʾ, with three dots below instead of one, named pe, is used in the Persian alphabet and the Kurdish alphabet to represent the voiceless bilabial plosive ⟨p⟩, a sound that does not exist in Arabic.. It is thus written as:

Position in word:	Isolated	Final	Medial	Initial
Glyph form: (Help)	پ	ـپ	ـپـ	پـ

== Hebrew bet ==
Orthographic variants
Various print fonts			Cursive Hebrew	Solitreo	Rashi script
Serif	Sans-serif	Monospaced	Cursive Hebrew	Solitreo	Rashi script
ב	ב	ב			

Hebrew spelling: בֵּית

The Hebrew letter represents two different phonemes: a "b" sound (/b/) (bet) and a "v" sound (/v/) (vet). When Hebrew is written Ktiv menuqad (with niqqud diacritics) the two are distinguished by a dot (called a dagesh) in the centre of the letter for /b/ and no dot for /v/. In modern Hebrew, the more commonly used Ktiv hasar niqqud spelling, which does not use diacritics, does not visually distinguish between the two phonemes.

This letter is named bet and vet, following the modern Israeli Hebrew pronunciation, bet and vet (/bet/), in Israel and by most Jews familiar with Hebrew, although some non-Israeli Ashkenazi speakers pronounce it beis (or bais) and veis (/bejs/) (or vais or vaiz). It is also named beth, following the Tiberian Hebrew pronunciation, in academic circles. An alternative blend sometimes used is the Ashkenazi pronunciation with a "t" at the end. Spelled as beit as in "beit hamigdash".

In modern Hebrew the frequency of the usage of bet, out of all the letters, is 4.98%.

=== Variations on written form/pronunciation ===
Name	Symbol	IPA	Transliteration	Example
Vet	ב	/v/	v	vote
Bet	בּ	/b/	b	boat

==== Bet with the dagesh ====
When the Bet appears as בּ with a "dot" in its center, known as a dagesh, then it represents /b/. There are various rules in Hebrew grammar that stipulate when and why a dagesh is used.

==== Bet without the dagesh (Vet) ====
In Ktiv menuqad spelling, which uses diacritics, when the letter appears as ב without the dagesh ("dot") in its center it represents a voiced labiodental fricative: /v/. In Ktiv hasar niqqud spelling, without diacritics, the letter without the dot may represent either phoneme.

=== Significance as prefix ===
As a prefix, i.e. when attached to the beginning of a word, the letter bet may function as a preposition meaning "in", "at", or "with".

=== Numerological and mystical significance ===
As a numeral, the letter represents the number 2, and, using various systems of dashes above or below, can stand for 2,000 and 20,000.

Bet in gematria represents the number 2.

Bet is the first letter of the Torah. As Bet is the number 2 in gematria, this is said to symbolize that there are two parts to Torah: the Written Torah and the Oral Torah. According to Jewish legend, the letter Bet was specially chosen among the 22 letters in Hebrew by God as the first letter of Torah as it begins with "Bereshit (In the beginning) God created heaven and earth."

Genesis Rabbah points out that the letter is closed on three sides and open on one; this is indicate that one can investigate what happened after creation, but not what happened before it, or what is above the heavens or below the earth.

== Syriac beth ==
Beth
Madnḫaya Beth
Serṭo Beth
Esṭrangela Beth

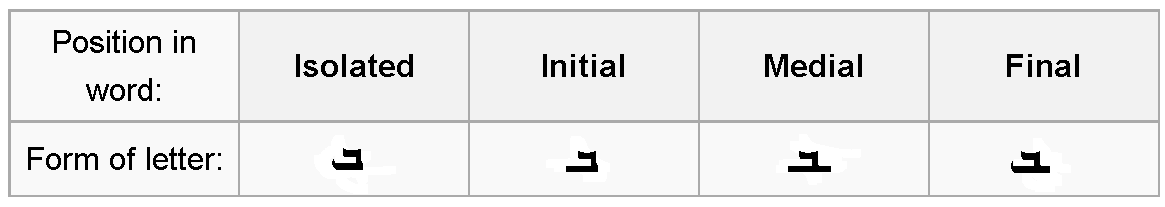

In the Syriac alphabet, the second letter is ܒ — Beth (ܒܹܝܬ). It is one of six letters that represents two associated sounds (the others are Gimel, Dalet, Kaph, Pe and Taw). When Beth has a hard pronunciation (qûššāyâ) it is a [b]. When Beth has a soft pronunciation (rûkkāḵâ) it is traditionally pronounced as a [v], similar to its Hebrew form. However, in eastern dialects, the soft Beth is more often pronounced as a [w], and can form diphthongs with its preceding vowel. Whether Beth should be pronounced as a hard or soft sound is generally determined by its context within a word. However, wherever it is traditionally geminate within a word, even in dialects that no longer distinguish double consonants, it is hard. In the West Syriac dialect, some speakers always pronounce Beth with its hard sound.

== Other uses ==
=== Mathematics ===
In set theory, the beth numbers stand for powers of infinite sets.

== Character encodings ==
Character information
Preview	ב		ب		ܒ		ࠁ		ℶ	
Unicode name	HEBREW LETTER BET		ARABIC LETTER BEH		SYRIAC LETTER BETH		SAMARITAN LETTER BIT		BET SYMBOL	
Encodings	decimal	hex	dec	hex	dec	hex	dec	hex	dec	hex
Unicode	1489	U+05D1	1576	U+0628	1810	U+0712	2049	U+0801	8502	U+2136
UTF-8	215 145	D7 91	216 168	D8 A8	220 146	DC 92	224 160 129	E0 A0 81	226 132 182	E2 84 B6
Numeric character reference	&#1489;	&#x5D1;	&#1576;	&#x628;	&#1810;	&#x712;	&#2049;	&#x801;	&#8502;	&#x2136;
Named character reference									&beth;	

Character information
Preview	𐎁		𐡁		𐤁	
Unicode name	UGARITIC LETTER BETA		IMPERIAL ARAMAIC LETTER BETH		PHOENICIAN LETTER BET	
Encodings	decimal	hex	dec	hex	dec	hex
Unicode	66433	U+10381	67649	U+10841	67841	U+10901
UTF-8	240 144 142 129	F0 90 8E 81	240 144 161 129	F0 90 A1 81	240 144 164 129	F0 90 A4 81
UTF-16	55296 57217	D800 DF81	55298 56385	D802 DC41	55298 56577	D802 DD01
Numeric character reference	&#66433;	&#x10381;	&#67649;	&#x10841;	&#67841;	&#x10901;

== See also ==
- Bayt/Beit/Beth/Bet (disambiguation), meaning 'house' in various Semitic languages; part of many place-names
