= Mary Beyt =

American artist

Mary Beyt (born 1959) is an American artist known for her work in abstract painting.

Beyt's work is included in the Whitney Museum of American Art.
