= Cyberbaiting =

Method of cyber bullying

Cyberbaiting is a recent trend of students provoking their teachers and posting mobile phone recordings of extreme reactions online to embarrass the teachers. This can even escalate to teachers losing their jobs.

Cyberbaiting is a form of bullying.

== Norton Online Family Report Information ==
According to the Norton report, one in five teachers have or know another teacher that has experienced cyberbaiting. 67% of teachers stated that being friends with students on social networks exposes them to the risk of cyberbaiting. 34% continue to "friend" their students. 51% of teachers say their school has a code of conduct for how teachers and students communicate with each other via social media.

== Possible causes ==
Cyber experts say that it can be caused by the new powerful, technical tools that are available to impulsive teens. The perceptions teens have about the internet are also a factor since whatever is done on the internet can be anonymous. Another factor is the mob mentality – nobody feels responsible if it is done in a pack. A North Carolina teacher who had many years of experience teaching in the classroom and mentoring other teachers says that some teachers are more vulnerable to others. She believes that teachers need to establish who is in control.

== Prevention ==
An article on verywell provides ideas on how to prevent cyberbaiting:

Teachers should develop a set of rules on the use of camera phones in their classroom.

Teachers should discuss digital citizenship and what their digital expectations are with their classes at the beginning of the year.

Teachers should not "friend" their students online.

Teachers should stay current on classroom management strategies.

Teachers should have brainstorming sessions with each other on how to address cyberbaiting.

Teachers should be prepared for a cyberbaiting incident in case one does happen.

== See also ==
- Cyberbullying
- Digital citizen
