= Wanbu Huayanjing Pagoda =

Building in Inner Mongolia, China

Coordinates: 40.837035°N 111.879924°E

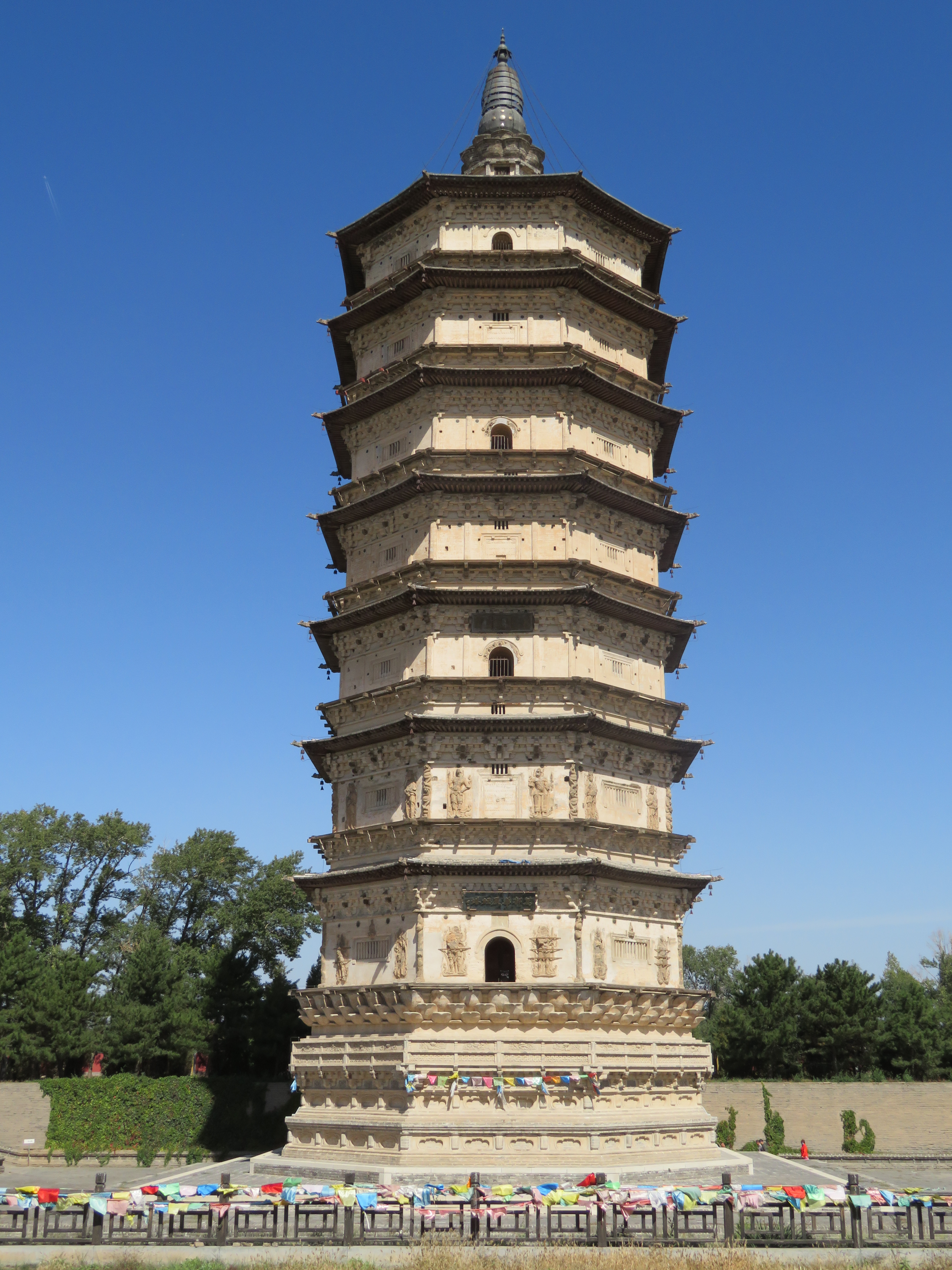
- Front view of the Wanbu Huayanjing Pagoda

Religion
- Affiliation: Buddhism

Location
- Location: Saihan District, Hohhot, Inner Mongolia, China
- Country: PRC
- Interactive map of Wanbu Huayanjing Pagoda

Architecture
- Type: Chinese
- Completed: 1055–1110

Wanbu Huayanjing Pagoda (Chinese: 万部华严经塔; pinyin: Wànbù Huáyánjīng Tǎ), commonly referred to as Baita or White Pagoda (Chinese: 白塔; pinyin: Bái Tǎ) is a large pagoda located in Saihan District, Hohhot, Inner Mongolia, China.

Built during the Liao dynasty, the tower is octagonal in shape and contains 7 floors, and was an important feature of the city of Fengzhou. In the late Yuan dynasty the city was destroyed and the tower was badly damaged, though it has since been repaired to its original state.

In 1982, it was listed as a protected cultural site at the national level, the highest level of protection awarded to important historic and cultural sites in China.

== History ==
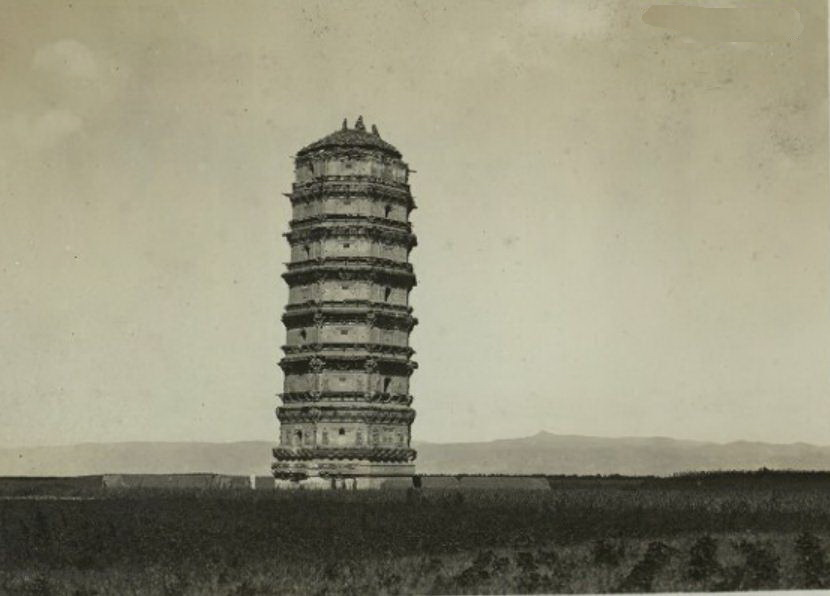
Wanbu Huayanjing Pagoda (Baita Pagoda) in 1942

The Wanbu Huayanjing Pagoda was built in the ancient city of Fengzhou (Chinese: 丰州; pinyin: Fēng Zhōu) during the Liao dynasty; though the exact date is unknown. Most sources suggest that the tower was likely complete during the reign of Emperor Daozong of Liao (1055–1110), an era in which a large number of temples and pagodas were built nationwide across the Liao dynasty.

When the tower was first complete, it was coated with a chalk-based clay, leading to a bright white exterior. It is from this unique coating that the tower received its common name; 'Baita', or 'White Pagoda', a name that is still used today and can be seen in the name of Hohhot's airport, Hohhot Baita International Airport, and the protected cultural site Baita railway station.

The tower was renovated in 1162 during the Jin dynasty era, and later repairs were made throughout the Yuan and Qing dynasties. During the destruction of the city of Fengzhou, in the late Yuan dynasty, the tower was heavily damaged, and the top of the tower was completely destroyed; though over time, it has been restored to its original state.

In February 1982, Baita was named as one of the 62 important historical and cultural buildings to receive protection by the National Cultural Heritage Administration as part of the 2nd batch of Major Historical and Cultural Sites.

== Structure ==
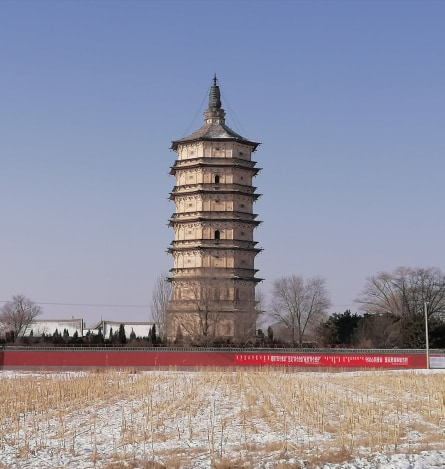
Wanbu Huayanjing Pagoda

Wanbu Huayanjing Pagoda stands at a height of 55m, with a diameter of 18m and is located entirely within the site of a former Buddhist monastery in modern day Baita Village (Chinese: 白塔村; pinyin: Báitǎ Cūn); 20 km east of Hohhot. The structure is primarily made up of bricks and white lime paste, with a large number of wooden arches supporting the structure internally. A winding staircase connects all seven floors, with natural light allowed to penetrate through ventilation holes located throughout the perimeter of the structure.

The base of the structure is designed to resemble a lotus flower, with the next two floors containing carvings of Bodhisattva; the remaining four floors contain no carvings. The first, third, fifth and seventh floors contain real doors facing east and west, with fake doors facing north and south. This pattern is reversed on the second, fourth and sixth floors.

The interior of the pagoda contains six stone tablets from the Jin era, containing detailed information about the city of Fengzhou, and more than 200 carvings from travellers dating back as far as 1172. These carvings display an array of languages, including Mongolian, Tibetan, Khitan, Jurchen, Persian and ancient Syrian.
