= Bayt =

Bayt (Arabic: بيت or Hebrew: בית, both meaning 'house'; there are similar words in various Semitic languages), also spelled bayit, bayyit, bait, beit, beth, bet, etc., may refer to:

== Jewish religious terms ==
- Temple Mount, Hebrew Har ha-Bayit, "Mount of the House"
- Beth Israel, "House of Israel"

== Islamic terms ==
- Ahl al-Bayt, the People of the House, referring to the household of Muhammad or to all pious Muslims

== Synagogues ==
- Beth Avraham Yoseph of Toronto, an Orthodox synagogue in Thornhill, Ontario, Canada

== Place-names and derivates ==
In alphabetical order including the articles.

=== Bayit ===
- Bayit VeGan

=== Bayt ===
A few outstanding ones:

- Bayt al-Allah (the Kaaba)
- Bayt al-Muqaddas (Jerusalem)

=== Beit ===
- Beit Jala
- Beit Sahour
- Beit Shemesh
- Beit Hanina
- Beitin
- Betar (fortress)
  - Battir

=== Beth ===
- Beth Alpha
- Beth-Horon
- Beth Shean
- Bethany
- Bethel/Beth-El
- Bethesda
- Bethlehem
- Bethsaida

== Institutions and organizations ==
First see above under "All pages with titles beginning with Bayt" and "All pages with titles containing Bayt". Here only those not spelled with "bayt".

- Bayit Lepletot, Orthodox Jewish orphanage for girls
- Bayit Leumi Israeli political organization
- Bayit Yehudi – 'The Jewish Home' political party
- Bayt al-hikmah (House of Wisdom); Umayyad library in Damascus, and Abbasid library in Baghdad
- Betar/Beitar, Jewish political organization; derived from Betar fortress

== Other ==
- Bayt (poetry), lit. 'house', a metrical unit of Asian poetry

== See also ==
- Bet (disambiguation)
  - Bet (letter), derived from the hyeroglyph for house
- Beth (disambiguation)
