= Beit (surname) =

Beit is a surname. Notable people with the surname include:

- Alfred Beit (1853–1906), German-South African businessman, brother of Otto
- Sir Otto Beit, 1st Baronet (1865–1930), British-German financier, brother of Alfred, father of Sir Alfred
- Sir Alfred Beit, 2nd Baronet (1903–1994), British politician, son of Otto
