= List of common physics notations =

This is a list of common physical constants and variables, and their notations. Note that bold text indicates that the quantity is a vector.

== Latin characters ==
Symbol	Meaning	SI unit of measure
$\mathbf{A}$	magnetic vector potential	tesla meter (T⋅m)
$A$	area	square meter (m^{2})
$A$	amplitude	meter
$A$	atomic mass number	unitless
$\mathbf{a}$	acceleration	meter per second squared (m/s^{2})
$\mathbf{B}$	magnetic flux density also called the magnetic field density or magnetic induction	tesla (T), or equivalently, weber per square meter (Wb/m^{2})
$C$	capacitance	farad (F)
$C$	heat capacity	joule per kelvin (J⋅K^{−1})
$C$	constant of integration	varied depending on context
$c$	speed of light (in vacuum)	299,792,458 meters per second (m/s)
$c$	speed of sound	meter per second (m/s)
$c$	specific heat capacity	joule per kilogram per kelvin (J⋅kg^{−1}⋅K^{−1})
$c$	viscous damping coefficient	kilogram per second (kg/s)
$\mathbf{D}$	electric displacement field also called the electric flux density	coulomb per square meter (C/m^{2})
$D$	density	kilogram per cubic meter (kg/m^{3})
$D$	diameter	meter (m)
$d$	distance	meter (m)
$d$	direction	unitless
$d$	impact parameter	meter (m)
$d$	differential (e.g. $dx$)	varied depending on context
$d\mathbf{A}$	differential vector element of surface area A, with infinitesimally small magnitude and direction normal to surface S	square meter (m^{2})
$dV$	differential element of volume V enclosed by surface S	cubic meter (m^{3})
$\mathbf{E}$	electric field	newton per coulomb (N⋅C^{−1}), or equivalently, volt per meter (V⋅m^{−1})
$E$	energy	joule (J)
$E$	Young's modulus	pascal (Pa) or newton per square meter (N/m^{2})
$e$	eccentricity	unitless
$e$	Euler's number (2.71828, base of the natural logarithm)	unitless
$e$	electron	unitless
$e$	elementary charge	coulomb (C)
$\mathbf{F}$	force	newton (N)
$F$	Faraday constant	coulombs per mole (C⋅mol^{−1})
$f$	frequency	hertz (Hz)
$f$	function	unitless
$f$	friction	newton (N)
$G$	electrical conductance	siemens (S)
$G$	universal gravitational constant	newton meter squared per kilogram squared (N⋅m^{2}/kg^{2})
$G$	shear modulus	pascal (Pa) or newton per square meter (N/m^{2})
$G$	gluon field strength tensor	inverse length squared (1/m^{2})
$\mathbf{g}$	acceleration due to gravity	meters per second squared (m/s^{2}), or equivalently, newtons per kilogram (N/kg)
$\mathbf{H}$	magnetic field strength	ampere per meter (A/m)
$H$	Hamiltonian	joule (J)
$H$	enthalpy	joule (J)
$H$	thermal current	watt (W)
$h$	height	meter (m)
$h$	Planck constant	joule second (J⋅s)
$\hbar$	reduced Planck constant	joule second (J⋅s)
$I$	action	joule second (J⋅s)
$I$	intensity	watt per square meter (W/m^{2})
$I$	sound intensity	watt per square meter (W/m^{2})
$I$	electric current	ampere (A)
$I$	moment of inertia	kilogram meter squared (kg⋅m^{2})
$i$	intensity	watt per square meter (W/m^{2})
$i$	imaginary unit	unitless
$i$	electric current	ampere (A)
$\mathbf{\hat{\imath}}$	Cartesian x-axis basis unit vector	unitless
$\mathbf{J}$	current density	ampere per square meter (A/m^{2})
$\mathbf{J}$	impulse	kilogram meter per second (kg⋅m/s)
$\mathbf{j}$	jerk	meter per second cubed (m/s^{3})
$j$	imaginary unit (electrical)	unitless
$\mathbf{\hat{\jmath}}$	Cartesian y-axis basis unit vector	unitless
$K$	kinetic energy	joule (J)
$\mathbf{k}$	wave vector	radian per meter (m^{−1})
$k$	Boltzmann constant	joule per kelvin (J/K)
$k$	wavenumber	radian per meter (m^{−1})
$k$	stiffness	newton per meter (N⋅m^{−1})
$\mathbf{\hat{k}}$	Cartesian z-axis basis unit vector	unitless
$\mathbf{L}$	angular momentum	newton meter second (N⋅m⋅s or kg⋅m^{2}⋅s^{−1})
$L$	inductance	henry (H)
$L$	luminosity	watt (W)
$L$	Lagrangian	joule (J)
$\mathcal{L}$	Lagrangian density	joule per cubic meter (J/m^{3})
$l$	length	meter (m)
ℓ	azimuthal quantum number	unitless
$\mathbf{M}$	magnetization	ampere per meter (A/m)
$M$	moment of force often simply called moment or torque	newton meter (N⋅m)
$m$	mass	kilogram (kg)
$\mathbf{N}$	normal vector	unit varies depending on context
$N$	neutron number	unitless
$n$	refractive index	unitless
$n$	principal quantum number	unitless
$n$	amount of substance	mole
$P$	power	watt (W)
$P$	active power (real power)	watt (W)
$P$	probability	unitless
$\mathbf{p}$	momentum	kilogram meter per second (kg⋅m/s)
$p$	pressure	pascal (Pa)
$Q$	electric charge	coulomb (C)
$Q$	heat	joule (J)
$Q$	Reactive Power	volt-ampere reactive (var)
$\mathbf{q}$	Generalized coordinates	varied depending on context (sometimes meter (m) or radian (rad))
$q$	electric charge	coulomb (C)
$R$	electrical resistance	ohm (Ω)
$R$	Ricci tensor	reciprocal square meter (m^{−2})
$R$	radiancy	meter per second
$R$	gas constant	joule per mole per kelvin (J⋅mol^{−1}⋅K^{−1})
$\mathbf{r}$	radius vector (position)	meter (m)
$r$	radius or distance	meter (m)
$S$	surface area	square meter (m^{2})
$S$	entropy	joule per kelvin (J/K)
$S$	action	joule second (J⋅s)
$S$	apparent power (complex power)	Volt-Ampere (VA)
$\mathbf{s}$	displacement	meter (m)
$s$	arc length	meter (m)
$s$	distance	meter (m)
$T$	period	second (s)
$T$	temperature	kelvin (K) or Celsius (C)
$T$	kinetic energy	joule (J)
$t$	time	second (s)
$\mathbf{U}$	four-velocity	meter per second (m/s)
$U$	potential energy	joule (J)
$U$	internal energy	joule (J)
**u**	initial velocity	meter per second (m/s)
$u$	relativistic mass	kilogram (kg)
$u$	energy density	joule per cubic meter (J/m^{3})
$u$	specific energy	joule per kilogram (J/kg)
$V$	voltage also called electric potential difference	volt (V)
$V$	volume	cubic meter (m^{3})
$V$	shear force	newton (N)
$\mathbf{v}$	velocity	meter per second (m/s)
$W$	weight	newton (N)
$W$	mechanical work	joule (J)
$w$	width	meter (m)
$X$	electrical reactance	ohm (Ω)
$\mathbf{x}$	position vector	meter (m)
$\mathbf{x}$	displacement	meter (m)
$x$	a generic unknown	varied depending on context
$Y$	admittance	siemens (S)
$Z$	atomic number	unitless
$Z$	compressibility factor	unitless
$Z$	electrical impedance	ohm (Ω)
$Z_0$	impedance of free space	ohm (Ω)

== Greek characters ==
Symbol	Name	Meaning	SI unit of measure
$\alpha$	alpha	alpha particle	
$\alpha$	alpha	angular acceleration	radian per second squared (rad/s^{2})
$\alpha$	alpha	fine-structure constant	unitless
$\beta$	beta	velocity in terms of the speed of light c	unitless
$\beta$	beta	beta particle	
$\gamma$	gamma	Lorentz factor	unitless
$\gamma$	gamma	photon	
$\gamma$	gamma	gamma ray	
$\gamma$	gamma	shear strain	radian
$\gamma$	gamma	heat capacity ratio	unitless
$\gamma$	gamma	surface tension	newton per meter (N/m)
$\Delta$	delta	change in a variable (e.g. $\Delta x$)	unitless
$\Delta$	delta	Laplace operator	per square meter (m^{−2})
$\delta$	delta	displacement (usually small)	meter (m)
$\delta$	delta	Dirac delta function	
$\delta$	delta	Kronecker delta (e.g $\delta_{ij}$)	
$\epsilon$	epsilon	permittivity	farad per meter (F/m)
$\epsilon$	epsilon	strain	unitless
$\varepsilon_0$	epsilon nought	Vacuum permittivity	farad per meter (F/m)
$\zeta$	zeta	damping ratio	unitless
$\eta$	eta	angular jerk	radian per second cubed (rad⋅s^{−3})
$\eta$	eta	energy efficiency	unitless
$\eta$	eta	(dynamic) viscosity (also $\mu$)	pascal second (Pa⋅s)
$\theta$	theta	angular displacement	radian (rad)
$\kappa$	kappa	torsion coefficient also called torsion constant	newton meter per radian (N⋅m/rad)
$\Lambda$	lambda	cosmological constant	per second squared (s^{−2})
$\lambda$	lambda	wavelength	meter (m)
$\lambda$	lambda	linear charge density	coulomb per meter (C/m)
$\lambda$	lambda	eigenvalue	non-zero vector
$\mathbf{\mu}$	mu	magnetic moment	ampere square meter (A⋅m^{2})
$\mathbf{\mu}$	mu	coefficient of friction	unitless
$\mathbf{\mu}$	mu	(dynamic) viscosity (also $\eta$)	pascal second (Pa⋅s)
$\mathbf{\mu}$	mu	permeability (electromagnetism)	henry per meter (H/m)
$\mathbf{\mu}$	mu	reduced mass	kilogram (kg)
$\mathbf{\mu}$	mu	Standard gravitational parameter	cubic meter per second squared
$\mathbf{\mu}_0$	mu nought	Vacuum permeability or the magnetic constant	henry per meter (H/m)
$\nu$	nu	frequency	hertz (Hz)
$\nu$	nu	kinematic viscosity	meter squared per second (m^{2}/s)
$\nu$	nu	neutrino	
$\xi$	xi	electromotive force	volt (V)
$\pi$	pi	3.14159... (irrational number)	unitless
$\rho$	rho	mass density usually simply called density	kilogram per cubic meter (kg/m^{3})
$\rho$	rho	volume charge density	coulomb per cubic meter (C/m^{3})
$\rho$	rho	resistivity	ohm meter (Ω⋅m)
$\Sigma$	sigma	summation operator	
$\sigma$	sigma	area charge density	coulomb per square meter (C/m^{2})
$\sigma$	sigma	electrical conductivity	siemens per meter (S/m)
$\sigma$	sigma	normal stress	pascal (Pa)
$\sigma$	sigma	scattering cross section	barn (10^-28 m^2)
$\sigma$	sigma	surface tension	newton per meter (N/m)
$\tau$	tau	torque	newton meter (N⋅m)
$\tau$	tau	shear stress	pascal (Pa)
$\tau$	tau	time constant	second (s)
$\tau$	tau	6.28318... (2π)	unitless
$\Phi$	phi	field strength	unit varies depending on context
$\Phi$	phi	magnetic flux	weber (Wb)
$\phi$	phi	electric potential	volt (V)
$\phi$	phi	Higgs field work function	
$\Psi$	psi	wave function	m^{−3/2}
$\Omega$	omega	electric resistance	ohm
$\omega$	omega	angular frequency	radian per second (rad/s)
$\omega$	omega	angular velocity	radian per second (rad/s)

== Other characters ==
Symbol	Name	Meaning	SI unit of measure
$\nabla\cdot$	nabla dot	the divergence operator often pronounced "del dot"	per meter (m^{−1})
$\nabla\times$	nabla cross	the curl operator often pronounced "del cross"	per meter (m^{−1})
$\nabla$	nabla	the gradient operator	per meter (m^{−1})
$\partial$	"der", "dow", "die", "partial" or simply "d"	partial derivative (e.g. $\partial y/\partial x$)	
$\Box$	D'Alembert operator	$\nabla^2-\partial_t^2$	
$\langle \, \, \rangle$	angle brackets	average sometimes over Maxwell–Boltzmann distribution	
$\langle \ | \ \rangle$	angle brackets	Dirac notation	
$\int$	integral	the inverse of the derivative.	unitless

== See also ==
- List of letters used in mathematics and science
- Glossary of mathematical symbols
- List of mathematical uses of Latin letters
- Greek letters used in mathematics, science, and engineering
- Physical constant
- Physical quantity
- International System of Units
- ISO 31
