= List of mathematical abbreviations =

This following list features abbreviated names of mathematical functions, function-like operators and other mathematical terminology.

This list is limited to abbreviations of two or more letters (excluding number sets). The capitalization of some of these abbreviations is not standardized – different authors might use different capitalizations.

== A ==
- A – adele ring or algebraic numbers.
- a.a.s. – asymptotically almost surely.
- AC – Axiom of Choice, or set of absolutely continuous functions.
- a.c. – absolutely continuous.
- acrd – inverse chord function.
- ad – adjoint representation (or adjoint action) of a Lie group.
- adj – adjugate of a matrix.
- a.e. – almost everywhere.
- AFSOC - Assume for the sake of contradiction
- Ai – Airy function.
- AL – Action limit.
- Alt – alternating group (Alt(n) is also written as A_{n}.)
- A.M. – arithmetic mean.
- AP – arithmetic progression.
- arccos – inverse cosine function.
- arccosec – inverse cosecant function. (Also written as arccsc.)
- arccot – inverse cotangent function.
- arccsc – inverse cosecant function. (Also written as arccosec.)
- arcexsec – inverse exsecant function.
- arcosech – inverse hyperbolic cosecant function. (Also written as arcsch.)
- arcosh – inverse hyperbolic cosine function.
- arcoth – inverse hyperbolic cotangent function.
- arcsch – inverse hyperbolic cosecant function. (Also written as arcosech.)
- arcsec – inverse secant function.
- arcsin – inverse sine function.
- arctan – inverse tangent function.
- arctan2 – inverse tangent function with two arguments. (Also written as atan2.)
- arg – argument of.
- arg max – argument of the maximum.
- arg min – argument of the minimum.
- arsech – inverse hyperbolic secant function.
- arsinh – inverse hyperbolic sine function.
- artanh – inverse hyperbolic tangent function.
- a.s. – almost surely.
- atan2 – inverse tangent function with two arguments. (Also written as arctan2.)
- A.P. – arithmetic progression.
- Aut – automorphism group.

== B ==
- bd – boundary. (Also written as fr or ∂.)
- Bi – Airy function of the second kind.
- BIDMAS – Brackets, Indices, Divide, Multiply, Add, Subtract.
- Bias – bias of an estimator .
- BWOC – by way of contradiction.

== C ==
- C – complex numbers.
- Card – cardinality of a set. (Card(X) is also written #X, ♯X or |X|.)
- cas – cos + sin function.
- cdf – cumulative distribution function.
- c.f. – cumulative frequency.
- c.c. – complex conjugate.
- char – characteristic of a ring.
- Chi – hyperbolic cosine integral function.
- Ci – cosine integral function.
- cis – cos + i sin function. (Also written as expi.)
- Cl – conjugacy class.
- cl – topological closure.
- CLT – central limit theorem.
- cod, codom – codomain.
- cok, coker – cokernel.
- colsp – column space of a matrix.
- conv – convex hull of a set.
- Cor – corollary.
- corr – correlation.
- cos – cosine function.
- cosec – cosecant function. (Also written as csc.)
- cosech – hyperbolic cosecant function. (Also written as csch.)
- cosh – hyperbolic cosine function.
- cosiv – coversine function. (Also written as cover, covers, cvs.)
- cot – cotangent function. (Also written as ctg.)
- coth – hyperbolic cotangent function.
- cov – covariance of a pair of random variables.
- cover – coversine function. (Also written as covers, cvs, cosiv.)
- covercos – covercosine function. (Also written as cvc.)
- covers – coversine function. (Also written as cover, cvs, cosiv.)
- crd – chord function.
- CRT – Chinese remainder theorem.
- csc – cosecant function. (Also written as cosec.)
- csch – hyperbolic cosecant function. (Also written as cosech.)
- ctg – cotangent function. (Also written as cot.)
- curl – curl of a vector field. (Also written as rot.)
- cvc – covercosine function. (Also written as covercos.)
- cvs – coversine function. (Also written as cover, covers, cosiv.)

== D ==
- def – define or definition.
- deg – degree of a polynomial, or other recursively defined objects such as well-formed formulas. (Also written as ∂.)
- del – del, a differential operator. (Also written as $\nabla$.)
- det – determinant of a matrix or linear transformation.
- DFT – discrete Fourier transform.
- dim – dimension of a vector space.
- div – divergence of a vector field.
- DNE – a solution for an expression does not exist, or is undefined. Generally used with limits and integrals.
- dom, domain – domain of a function. (Or, more generally, a relation.)

== E ==
- End – categories of endomorphisms.
- Ei – exponential integral function.
- epi – epigraph of a function.
- Eqn – equation.
- erf – error function.
- erfc – complementary error function.
- erfcx – scaled complementary error function.
- erfi – imaginary error function.
- etr – exponent of the trace.
- excsc – excosecant function. (Also written as coexsec.)
- exsec – exsecant function.
- exp – exponential function. (exp x is also written as e^{x}.)
- expi – cos + i sin function. (Also written as cis.)
- expm1 – exponential minus 1 function. (Also written as exp1m.)
- exp1m – exponential minus 1 function. (Also written as expm1.)
- Ext – Ext functor.
- ext – exterior.
- extr – a set of extreme points of a set.

== F ==
- FFT – fast Fourier transform.
- FIP – finite intersection property.
- FOC – first order condition.
- FOL – first-order logic.
- fr – boundary. (Also written as bd or ∂.)
- Frob – Frobenius endomorphism.
- FT – Fourier transform.
- FTA – fundamental theorem of arithmetic or fundamental theorem of algebra.

== G ==
- Gal – Galois group. (Also written as Γ.)
- gcd – greatest common divisor of two numbers. (Also written as hcf.)
- gd – Gudermannian function.
- GF – Galois field.
- GF – generating function.
- GL – general linear group.
- G.M. – geometric mean.
- glb – greatest lower bound. (Also written as inf.)
- G.P. – geometric progression.
- grad – gradient of a function.
- graph – graph of a function.

== H ==
- H – quaternion numbers.
- hacover – hacoversine function. (Also written as hacovers, hcv.)
- hacovercos – hacovercosine function. (Also written as hcc.)
- hacovers – hacoversine function. (Also written as hacover, hcv.)
- hav – haversine function. (Also written as sem.)
- havercos – havercosine function. (Also written as hvc.)
- h.c. – Hermitian conjugate, often used as part of + h.c. (Also written as H.c.)
- hcc – hacovercosine function. (Also written as hacovercos.)
- hcv – hacoversine function. (Also written as hacover, hacovers.)
- hcf – highest common factor of two numbers. (Also written as gcd.)
- H.M. – harmonic mean.
- HOL – higher-order logic.
- Hom – Hom functor.
- hom – hom-class.
- hot – higher order term.
- HOTPO – half or triple plus one.
- hvc – havercosine function. (Also written as havercos.)
- hyp – hypograph of a function.

== I ==
- iff – if and only if.
- IH – induction hypothesis.
- iid – independent and identically distributed random variables.
- Im – imaginary part of a complex number. (Also written as $\Im$.)
- im – image.
- inf – infimum of a set. (Also written as glb.)
- int – interior.
- I.o. – Infinitely often.

== K ==
- ker – kernel.

== L ==
- lb – binary logarithm (log_{2}). (Also written as ld.)
- lcm – lowest common multiple (a.k.a. least common multiple) of two numbers.
- LCHS – locally compact Hausdorff second countable.
- ld – binary logarithm (log_{2}). (Also written as lb.)
- lsc – lower semi-continuity.
- lerp – linear interpolation.
- lg – common logarithm (log_{10}) or binary logarithm (log_{2}).
- LHS – left-hand side of an equation.
- Li – offset logarithmic integral function.
- li – logarithmic integral function or linearly independent.
- lim – limit of a sequence, or of a function.
- lim inf – limit inferior.
- lim sup – limit superior.
- LLN – law of large numbers.
- ln – natural logarithm, log_{e}.
- lnp1 – natural logarithm plus 1 function.
- ln1p – natural logarithm plus 1 function.
- log – logarithm. (If without a subscript, this may mean either log_{10} or log_{e}.)
- logh – natural logarithm, log_{e}.
- LST – language of set theory.
- lub – least upper bound. (Also written sup.)

== M ==
- max – maximum of a set.
- MGF – moment-generating function.
- M.I. – mathematical induction.
- min – minimum of a set.
- mod – modulo.
- Mp – metaplectic group.
- mtanh – modified hyperbolic tangent function. (Also written as mth.)
- mth – modified hyperbolic tangent function. (Also written as mtanh.)
- mx – matrix.

== N ==
- N – natural numbers.
- NAND – not-and in logic.
- No. – number.
- NOR – not-or in logic.
- NTS – need to show.
- Null, null – (See Kernel.)
- Nullity, nullity – nullity.

== O ==
- O – octonion numbers.
- OBGF – ordinary bivariate generating function.
- ob – object class.
- ODE - ordinary differential equation
- ord – ordinal number of a well-ordered set.
- O/W - otherwise.

== P ==
- pdf – probability density function.
- pf – proof.
- PGL – projective general linear group.
- Pin – pin group.
- pmf – probability mass function.
- Pn – previous number.
- Pr – probability of an event. (See Probability theory. Also written as P or $\mathbb{P}$.)
- probit – probit function.
- PRNG – pseudorandom number generator.
- PSL – projective special linear group.
- PNT – prime number theorem.
- PRP – probable prime.
- PSO – projective orthogonal group.
- PSU – projective special unitary group.
- PU – projective unitary group.

== Q ==
- Q – rational numbers.
- QED – "Quod erat demonstrandum", a Latin phrase used at the end of a definitive proof.
- QEF – "Quod erat faciendum", a Latin phrase sometimes used at the end of a geometrical construction.

== R ==
- R – real numbers.
- ran – range of a function.
- rank – rank of a matrix. (Also written as rk.)
- Re – real part of a complex number. (Also written $\Re$.)
- resp – respectively.
- RHS – right-hand side of an equation.
- rk – rank. (Also written as rank.)
- RMS, rms – root mean square.
- rng – non-unital ring.
- rot – rotor of a vector field. (Also written as curl.)
- rowsp – row space of a matrix.
- RTP – required to prove.
- RV – random variable. (Also written as R.V.)

== S ==
- S – sedenion numbers.
- SD – standard deviation.
- SE – standard error.
- sec – secant function.
- sech – hyperbolic secant function.
- seg – initial segment of.
- sem – haversine function. (Also written as hav.)
- SFIP – strong finite intersection property.
- sgn – sign function.
- Shi – hyperbolic sine integral function.
- Si – sine integral function.
- sigmoid – sigmoid function.
- sin – sine function.
- sinc – sinc function.
- sinh – hyperbolic sine function.
- siv – versine function. (Also written as ver, vers.)
- SL – special linear group.
- SO – special orthogonal group.
- SOC – second order condition.
- Soln – solution.
- Sp – symplectic group.
- Sp – trace of a matrix, from the German "spur" used for the trace.
- sp, span – linear span of a set of vectors. (Also written with angle brackets.)
- Spec – spectrum of a ring.
- Spin – spin group.
- sqrt – square root.
- s.t. – such that or so that or subject to.
- st – standard part function.
- STP – [it is] sufficient to prove.
- SU – special unitary group.
- sup – supremum of a set. (Also written as lub, which stands for least upper bound.)
- supp – support of a function.
- swish – swish function, an activation function in data analysis.
- Sym – symmetric group (Sym(n) is also written as S_{n}) or symmetric algebra.

== T ==
- T – trigintaduonion numbers.
- tan – tangent function. (Also written as tgn, tg.)
- tanh – hyperbolic tangent function.
- TFAE – the following are equivalent.
- tg – tangent function. (Also written as tan, tgn.)
- tgn – tangent function. (Also written as tan, tg.)
- Thm – theorem.
- Tor – Tor functor.
- Tr – field trace.
- tr – trace of a matrix or linear transformation. (Also written as Sp.)

== U ==
- undef – a function or expression is undefined.
- usc – upper semi-continuity.

== V ==
- V – volume.
- var – variance of a random variable.
- vcs – vercosine function. (Also written as vercos.)
- ver – versine function. (Also written as vers, siv.)
- vercos – vercosine function. (Also written as vcs.)
- vers – versine function. (Also written as ver, siv.)

== W ==
- W^5 – which was what we wanted. Synonym of Q.E.D.
- walog – without any loss of generality.
- wff – well-formed formula.
- whp – with high probability.
- wlog – without loss of generality.
- WMA – we may assume.
- WO – well-ordered set.
- WOP – well-ordered principle.
- w.p. – with probability.
- wp1 – with probability 1.
- wrt – with respect to or with regard to.
- WTP – want to prove.
- WTS – want to show.

== X ==
- XOR – exclusive or in logic.

== Z ==
- Z – integer numbers.
- ZF – Zermelo–Fraenkel axioms of set theory.
- ZFC – Zermelo–Fraenkel axioms (with the Axiom of Choice) of set theory.

== See also ==
- List of letters used in mathematics, science, and engineering
- ISO 31-11
- Language of mathematics
- List of mathematical jargon
- Mathematical notation
- Notation in probability and statistics
- Physical constants
- List of logic symbols
- Glossary of mathematical symbols
- Mathematical operators and symbols in Unicode
- List of mathematical functions
