= Greek letters used in mathematics, science, and engineering =

Symbols for constants, special functions

Greek letters are used in mathematics, science, engineering, and other areas where mathematical notation is used as symbols for constants, special functions, and also conventionally for variables representing certain quantities. In these contexts, the capital letters and the small letters represent distinct and unrelated entities. Those Greek letters which have the same form as Latin letters are rarely used: capital Α, Β, Ε, Ζ, Η, Ι, Κ, Μ, Ν, Ο, Ρ, Τ, Υ, and Χ. Small ι, ο and υ are also rarely used, since they closely resemble the Latin letters i, o and u. Sometimes, font variants of Greek letters are used as distinct symbols in mathematics, in particular for ε/ϵ and π/ϖ. The archaic letter digamma (Ϝ/ϝ/ϛ) is sometimes used.

The Bayer designation naming scheme for stars typically uses the first Greek letter, α, for the brightest star in each constellation, and runs through the alphabet before switching to Latin letters.

In mathematical finance, the Greeks are the variables denoted by Greek letters used to describe the risk of certain investments.

== Typography ==
Some common conventions:

- Intensive quantities in physics are usually denoted with minuscules
  while extensive are denoted with capital letters.
- Most symbols are written in italics.
- Vectors can be denoted in boldface.
- Sets of numbers are typically bold or blackboard bold.

The Greek letter forms used in mathematics are often different from those used in Greek-language text: they are designed to be used in isolation, not connected to other letters, and some use variant forms which are not normally used in current Greek typography.

The OpenType font format has the feature tag "mgrk" ("Mathematical Greek") to identify a glyph as representing a Greek letter to be used in mathematical (as opposed to Greek language) contexts.

The table below shows a comparison of Greek letters rendered in TeX and HTML. The lowercase Greek letters used in the TeX rendering is an italic style. This is in line with the convention that variables should be italicized. As Greek letters are more often than not used as variables in mathematical formulas, a Greek letter appearing similar to the TeX rendering is more likely to be encountered in works involving mathematics. Unlike Unicode and HTML, TeX does not have special symbols for Greek capital letters that look identical to their Latin counterparts. Instead the Latin capital letters A, E, Z, H, I, K, M, N, O, P, T, X are used for capital Alpha, Epsilon, Zeta, Eta, Iota, Kappa, Mu, Nu, Omicron, Rho, Tau, and Chi respectively.

Greek letters in HTML and TeX (α–μ)
Name	TeX	HTML
Alpha	$\Alpha \, \alpha$	Α α
Beta	$\Beta \, \beta$	Β β
Gamma	$\Gamma \, \gamma$	Γ γ
Delta	$\Delta \, \delta$	Δ δ
Epsilon	$\Epsilon \, \epsilon \, \varepsilon$	Ε ϵ ε
Digamma	$\Digamma \, \digamma$	Ϝ ϝ
Zeta	$\Zeta \, \zeta$	Ζ ζ
Eta	$\Eta \, \eta$	Η η
Theta	$\Theta \, \theta \, \vartheta$	Θ θ ϑ
Iota	$\Iota \, \iota$	Ι ι
Kappa	$\Kappa \, \kappa \, \varkappa$	Κ κ ϰ
Lambda	$\Lambda \, \lambda$	Λ λ
Mu	$\Mu \, \mu$	Μ μ

Greek letters in HTML and TeX (ν–ω)
Name	TeX	HTML
Nu	$\Nu \, \nu$	Ν ν
Xi	$\Xi \, \xi$	Ξ ξ
Omicron	$\mathrm{\Omicron} \, o$	Ο ο
Pi	$\Pi \, \pi \, \varpi$	Π π ϖ
Rho	$\Rho \, \rho \, \varrho$	Ρ ρ ϱ
Sigma	$\Sigma \, \sigma \, \varsigma$	Σ σ ς
Tau	$\Tau \, \tau$	Τ τ
Upsilon	$\Upsilon \, \upsilon$	Υ υ
Phi	$\Phi \, \phi \, \varphi$	Φ ϕ φ
Chi	$\Chi \, \chi$	Χ χ
Psi	$\Psi \, \psi$	Ψ ψ
Omega	$\Omega \, \omega$	Ω ω

Greek letters with typographical variations
Name	Greek Letter	Bold	Italic	Bold Italic	Sans-Serif Bold	Sans-Serif Bold Italic	APL	Double struck bold	Unicode variants or similar
Alpha	Α α	𝚨 𝛂	𝛢 𝛼	𝜜 𝜶	𝝖 𝝰	𝞐 𝞪	⍺ ⍶		
Beta	Β β ϐ ᵝ ᵦ	𝚩 𝛃	𝛣 𝛽	𝜝 𝜷	𝝗 𝝱	𝞑 𝞫			
Gamma	Γ γ ᴦ ᵞ ᵧ	𝚪 𝛄	𝛤 𝛾	𝜞 𝜸	𝝘 𝝲	𝞒 𝞬		ℾ ℽ	
Delta	Δ δ ᵟ	𝚫 𝛅	𝛥 𝛿	𝜟 𝜹	𝝙 𝝳	𝞓 𝞭			U+2206 ∆ INCREMENT, U+2207 ∇ NABLA
Epsilon	Ε ε ϵ ϶	𝚬 𝛆 𝛜	𝛦 𝜀 𝜖	𝜠 𝜺 𝝐	𝝚 𝝴 𝞊	𝞔 𝞮 𝟄	⍷		U+2208 ∈ ELEMENT OF–U+220D ∍ SMALL CONTAINS AS MEMBER
Zeta	Ζ ζ	𝚭 𝛇	𝛧 𝜁	𝜡 𝜻	𝝛 𝝵	𝞕 𝞯			
Eta	Η η Ͱ ͱ	𝚮 𝛈	𝛨 𝜂	𝜢 𝜼	𝝜 𝝶	𝞖 𝞰			
Theta	Θ θ ϑ ϴ ᶿ	𝚯 𝛉 𝚹 𝛝	𝛩 𝜃 𝛳 𝜗	𝜣 𝜽 𝜭 𝝑	𝝝 𝝷 𝝧 𝞋	𝞗 𝞱 𝞡 𝟅			
Iota	Ι ι ᶥ ℩	𝚰 𝛊	𝛪 𝜄	𝜤 𝜾	𝝞 𝝸	𝞘 𝞲	⍳ ⍸		
Kappa	Κ κ ϰ	𝚱 𝛋 𝛞	𝛫 𝜅 𝜘	𝜥 𝜿 𝝒	𝝟 𝝹 𝞌	𝞙 𝞳 𝟆			
Lambda	Λ λ ᴧ	𝚲 𝛌	𝛬 𝜆	𝜦 𝝀	𝝠 𝝺	𝞚 𝞴			
Mu	Μ μ	𝚳 𝛍	𝛭 𝜇	𝜧 𝝁	𝝡 𝝻	𝞛 𝞵			
Nu	Ν ν	𝚴 𝛎	𝛮 𝜈	𝜨 𝝂	𝝢 𝝼	𝞜 𝞶			
Xi	Ξ ξ	𝚵 𝛏	𝛯 𝜉	𝜩 𝝃	𝝣 𝝽	𝞝 𝞷			
Omicron	Ο ο	𝚶 𝛐	𝛰 𝜊	𝜪 𝝄	𝝤 𝝾	𝞞 𝞸			
Pi	Π π ϖ ᴨ	𝚷 𝛑 𝛡	𝛱 𝜋 𝜛	𝜫 𝝅 𝝕	𝝥 𝝿 𝞏	𝞟 𝞹 𝟉		ℿ ℼ	U+220F ∏ N-ARY PRODUCT, U+2210 ∐ N-ARY COPRODUCT
Rho	Ρ ρ Ῥ ῥ ῤ ϱ ϼ ᴩ ᵨ ☧	𝚸 𝛒 𝛠	𝛲 𝜌 𝜚	𝜬 𝝆 𝝔	𝝦 𝞀 𝞎	𝞠 𝞺 𝟈	⍴		
Sigma	Σ σ ς Ϲ ϲ Ͻ ͻ Ͼ ͼ Ͽ ͽ	𝚺 𝛔 𝛓	𝛴 𝜎 𝜍	𝜮 𝝈 𝝇	𝝨 𝞂 𝞁	𝞢 𝞼 𝞻		⅀	U+2211 ∑ N-ARY SUMMATION
Tau	Τ τ	𝚻 𝛕	𝛵 𝜏	𝜯 𝝉	𝝩 𝞃	𝞣 𝞽			
Upsilon	Υ υ ϒ	𝚼 𝛖	𝛶 𝜐	𝜰 𝝊	𝝪 𝞄	𝞤 𝞾			
Phi	Φ φ ϕ	𝚽 𝛗 𝛟	𝛷 𝜑 𝜙	𝜱 𝝋 𝝓	𝝫 𝞅 𝞍	𝞥 𝞿 𝟇			
Chi	Χ χᵡᵪ☧	𝚾 𝛘	𝛸 𝜒	𝜲 𝝌	𝝬 𝞆	𝞦 𝟀			
Psi	Ψ ψ ᴪ	𝚿 𝛙	𝛹 𝜓	𝜳 𝝍	𝝭 𝞇	𝞧 𝟁			
Omega	Ω ω ꭥ	𝛀 𝛚	𝛺 𝜔	𝜴 𝝎	𝝮 𝞈	𝞨 𝟂	⍵ ⍹		U+2126 Ω OHM SIGN, U+2127 ℧ INVERTED OHM SIGN

== Concepts represented by a Greek letter ==
=== Αα (alpha) ===
- $\alpha$ represents:
  - the first angle in a triangle, opposite the side a
  - the statistical significance of a result
  - the false positive rate in statistics ("Type I" error)
  - the fine-structure constant in physics
  - the angle of attack of an aircraft
  - an alpha particle (He^{2+})
  - angular acceleration in physics
  - the linear thermal expansion coefficient
  - the thermal diffusivity
  - In organic chemistry the α-carbon is the backbone carbon next to the carbonyl carbon, most often for amino acids
  - right ascension in astronomy
  - the brightest star in a constellation
  - Iron ferrite and numerous phases within materials science
  - the return in excess of the compensation for the risk borne in investment
  - the α-conversion in lambda calculus
  - the independence number of a graph
  - a placeholder for ordinal numbers in mathematical logic
  - a type of receptor for the neurotransmitter noradrenaline in neuroscience

=== Ββ (beta) ===
- $\Beta$ represents the beta function
- $\beta$ represents:
  - the thermodynamic beta, equal to (k_{B}T)^{−1}, where k_{B} is the Boltzmann constant and T is the absolute temperature.
  - the second angle in a triangle, opposite the side b
  - the standardized regression coefficient for predictor or independent variables in linear regression (unstandardized regression coefficients are represented with the lower-case Latin b, but are often called "betas" as well)
  - the ratio of collector current to base current in a bipolar junction transistor (BJT) in electronics (current gain)
  - the false negative rate in statistics ("Type II" error)
  - the beta coefficient, the non-diversifiable risk, of an asset in mathematical finance
  - the sideslip angle of an airplane
  - a beta particle (e^{−} or e^{+})
  - the beta brain wave in brain or cognitive sciences
  - ecliptic latitude in astronomy
  - the ratio of plasma pressure to magnetic pressure in plasma physics
  - β-reduction in lambda calculus
  - the ratio of the velocity of an object to the speed of light as used in the Lorentz factor
  - a type of receptor for the noradrenaline neurotransmitter in neuroscience

=== Γγ (gamma) ===
- $\Gamma$ represents:
  - the circulation in fluid dynamics
  - the reflection coefficient of a transmission or telecommunication line.
  - the confinement factor of an optical mode in a waveguide
  - the gamma function, a generalization of the factorial
  - the upper incomplete gamma function
  - the modular group, the group of fractional linear transformations
  - the gamma distribution, a continuous probability distribution defined using the gamma function
  - second-order sensitivity to price in mathematical finance
  - the Christoffel symbols that describe components of a metric connection
  - the stack alphabet in the formal definition of a pushdown automaton, or the tape-alphabet in the formal definition of a Turing machine
  - the Feferman–Schütte ordinal Γ_{0}
  - atmospheric lapse rates in meteorology
- $\gamma$ represents:
  - the specific weight of substances
  - the lower incomplete gamma function
  - the third angle in a triangle, opposite the side c
  - the Euler–Mascheroni constant in mathematics
  - gamma rays and the photon
  - the heat capacity ratio in thermodynamics
  - the Lorentz factor in special relativity
  - the flight path angle of an airplane

=== Δδ (delta) ===
- $\Delta$ represents:
  - a finite difference
  - a difference operator
  - a symmetric difference
  - the Laplace operator
  - giving heat in a chemical reaction
  - the angle that subtends the arc of a circular curve in surveying
  - the maximum degree of any vertex in a given graph
  - sensitivity to price in mathematical finance
  - the discriminant of a polynomial (in a quadratic polynomial determines the nature of the roots)
- $\delta$ represents:
  - percent error
  - a variation in the calculus of variations
  - the Kronecker delta function
  - the Feigenbaum constants
  - the force of interest in mathematical finance
  - the Dirac delta function
  - the receptor which enkephalins have the highest affinity for in pharmacology
  - the Skorokhod integral in Malliavin calculus, a subfield of stochastic analysis
  - the minimum degree of any vertex in a given graph
  - a partial charge. δ− represents a negative partial charge, and δ+ represents a positive partial charge in chemistry(See also: Solvation)
  - the chemical shift of an atomic nucleus in NMR spectroscopy. For protons, this is relative to tetramethylsilane = 0
  - stable isotope compositions
  - declination in astronomy
  - noncentrality measure in statistics
  - The transition function in the formal definition of a finite automaton, pushdown automaton, or Turing machine
  - Infinitesimal - see Limit of a function § (ε, δ)-definition of limit
- Not to be confused with ∂ which is based on the Latin letter d but often called a "script delta"

=== Εε (epsilon) ===
- $\epsilon$ represents:
  - a small positive quantity; see limit
  - a random error in regression analysis
  - the absolute value of an error
  - in set theory, the limit ordinal of the sequence $\omega,\omega^{\omega},\omega^{\omega^{\omega}},\dots$
  - in computer science, the empty string
  - the Levi-Civita symbol
  - in electromagnetics, dielectric permittivity
  - emissivity
  - strain in continuum mechanics
  - permittivity
  - the Earth's axial tilt in astronomy
  - elasticity in economics
  - electromotive force
  - in chemistry, the molar extinction coefficient of a chromophore
  - in mathematics, a surreal number that is bigger than zero, but smaller than all positive real numbers.
- set membership symbol ∈ is based on ε

=== Ϝϝ (digamma) ===
- Ϝ is sometimes used to represent the digamma function, though the Latin letter F (which is nearly identical) is usually substituted.
- A hypothetical particle Ϝ speculated to be implicated in the 750 GeV diphoton excess, now known to be simply a statistical anomaly

=== Ζζ (zeta) ===
- $\zeta$ represents:
  - the Riemann zeta function and other zeta functions in mathematics
  - the damping ratio
  - the value for the Zeta potential, i.e., the electrical potential at the slipping plane, used often in colloidal chemistry

=== Ηη (eta) ===
- $\Eta$ represents:
  - the Eta function of Ludwig Boltzmann's H-theorem ("Eta" theorem), in statistical mechanics
  - Information theoretic (Shannon) entropy
- $\eta$ represents:
  - the intrinsic wave impedance of a medium (e.g. the impedance of free space)
  - the partial regression coefficient in statistics, also interpreted as an effect size measure for analyses of variance
  - the eta meson
  - viscosity
  - the Dedekind eta function
  - energy conversion efficiency
  - efficiency (physics)
  - the pseudorapidity of a particle in physics
  - the Minkowski metric tensor in relativity
  - η-conversion in lambda calculus
  - the learning rate in machine learning and statistics
  - the hapticity of a coordination complex ligand

=== Θθ (theta) ===
- $\Theta$ (uppercase) represents:
  - an asymptotically tight bound related to big O notation.
  - sensitivity to the passage of time in mathematical finance
  - in set theory, a certain ordinal number
  - Heaviside step function
- $\theta$ (lowercase) represents:
  - a plane angle in geometry
  - the angle to the x axis in the xy-plane in spherical or cylindrical coordinates (mathematics)
  - the angle to the z axis in spherical coordinates (physics)
  - the potential temperature in thermodynamics
  - theta functions
  - the angle of a scattered photon during a Compton scattering interaction
  - the angular displacement of a particle rotating about an axis
  - the Watterson estimator in population genetics
  - the thermal resistance between two bodies
- $\vartheta$ ("script theta"), the cursive form of theta, often used in handwriting, represents
  - the first Chebyshev function in number theory
  - Theta role in linguistics

=== Ιι (iota) ===
- $\iota$ represents:
  - an inclusion map in set theory
  - the index generator function in APL (in the form ⍳)
  - the interior product

=== Κκ (kappa) ===
- $\Kappa$ represents:
  - the Kappa number, indicating lignin content in pulp
- $\kappa$ represents:
  - the Von Kármán constant, describing the velocity profile of turbulent flow
  - the kappa curve, a two-dimensional algebraic curve
  - the condition number of a matrix in numerical analysis
  - the connectivity of a graph in graph theory
  - curvature
  - dielectric constant $(\varepsilon / \varepsilon_0)$
  - thermal conductivity (usually a lowercase Latin $k$)
  - electrical conductivity of a solution
  - thermal diffusivity
  - a spring constant (usually a lowercase Latin $k$)
  - the heat capacity ratio in thermodynamics (usually $\gamma$)
  - the receptor which dynorphins have the highest affinity for in pharmacology
  - Einstein gravitational constant

=== Λλ (lambda) ===
- $\Lambda$ represents:
  - the Lebesgue constant, a bound for the interpolation error
  - the von Mangoldt function in number theory
  - the set of logical axioms in the axiomatic method of logical deduction in first-order logic
  - the cosmological constant
  - the lambda baryon
  - a diagonal matrix of eigenvalues in linear algebra
  - a lattice
  - molar conductivity in electrochemistry
  - Iwasawa algebra
- $\lambda$ represents:
  - one wavelength of electromagnetic radiation
  - the decay constant in radioactivity
  - function expressions in the lambda calculus
  - a general eigenvalue in linear algebra
  - the expected number of occurrences in a Poisson distribution in probability
  - the arrival rate in queueing theory
  - the failure rate in reliability engineering
  - the Lagrange multiplier in mathematical optimization, known as the shadow price in economics
  - the Lebesgue measure denotes the volume or measure of a Lebesgue measurable set
  - longitude in geodesy
  - linear density
  - ecliptic longitude in astronomy
  - the Liouville function in number theory
  - the Carmichael function in number theory
  - the empty string in formal grammar
  - a formal system (lambda calculus) in mathematical logic
  - thermal conductivity
  - the Lorentz transformation
  - non-standard bonding number in inorganic chemistry, such as in a parent hydride

=== Μμ (mu) ===
- $\mu$ represents:
  - the Möbius function in number theory
  - the population mean or expected value in probability and statistics
  - a measure in measure theory
  - micro-, an SI prefix denoting 10^{−6} (one millionth)
  - Micrometre or micron (retired in 1967 as a standalone symbol, replaced by "μm" using the standard SI meaning)
  - the coefficient of friction in physics
  - the service rate in queueing theory
  - the dynamic viscosity in physics
  - magnetic permeability in electromagnetics
  - a muon
  - reduced mass
  - the ion mobility in plasma physics
  - the Standard gravitational parameter in celestial mechanics
  - population mean in statistics
  - chemical potential in thermodynamics
  - Absorption coefficient
  - Amplification factor
  - Magnetic moment of a dipole

=== Νν (nu) ===
- $\nu$ represents:
  - frequency in physics in hertz (Hz)
  - Poisson's ratio in materials science
  - a neutrino
  - kinematic viscosity of liquids
  - stoichiometric coefficient in chemistry
  - true anomaly in celestial mechanics
  - degrees of freedom in statistics
  - the matching number of a graph
  - the p-adic valuation of a number
  - the number of neutrons released per fission of an atom in nuclear physics.

=== Ξξ (xi) ===
- $\Xi$ represents:
  - the original Riemann Xi function, i.e. Riemann's lower case ξ, as denoted by Edmund Landau and currently
  - the xi baryon
- $\xi$ represents:
  - the original Riemann Xi function
  - the modified definition of Riemann xi function, as denoted by Edmund Landau
  - the extent of reaction

=== Οο (omicron) ===
- $\Omicron$ represents:
  - O (for "Ordnung") in Donald Knuth's reading of the big O notation

=== Ππ (pi) ===
- $\Pi$ represents:
  - the product operator in mathematics
  - a plane
  - the unary projection operation in relational algebra
  - the Pi function, i.e. the Gamma function when offset to coincide with the factorial
  - the complete elliptic integral of the third kind
  - the fundamental groupoid
  - osmotic pressure
- $\pi$ represents:
  - Archimedes' constant (more commonly just called Pi), the ratio of a circle's circumference to its diameter
  - the prime-counting function
  - the state distribution of a Markov chain
  - in reinforcement learning, a policy function defining how a software agent behaves for each possible state of its environment
  - a type of covalent bond in chemistry (pi bond)
  - a pion (pi meson) in particle physics
  - in statistics, the population proportion
  - nucleotide diversity in molecular genetics
  - in electronics, a special type of small-signal model is referred to as a hybrid-pi model
  - in discrete mathematics, a permutation
  - Projection
  - parallax in astronomy
- $\varpi$ (a graphic variant, see pomega) represents:
  - angular frequency of a wave, in fluid dynamics (angular frequency is usually represented by $\omega$ but this may be confused with vorticity in a fluid dynamics context)
  - longitude of pericenter, in astronomy
  - comoving distance, in cosmology
  - the lemniscate constant

=== Ρρ (rho) ===
- $\Rho$ represents:
  - one of the Gegenbauer functions in analytic number theory (may be replaced by the capital form of the Latin letter P).
- $\rho$ represents:
  - one of the Gegenbauer functions in analytic number theory.
  - the Dickman–de Bruijn function
  - the radius in a polar, cylindrical, or spherical coordinate system
  - the correlation coefficient in statistics
  - the radius of convergence in real analysis
  - the sensitivity to interest rate in mathematical finance
  - density (mass or charge per unit volume; may be replaced by the capital form of the Latin letter D)
  - resistivity
  - the shape and reshape operators in APL (in the form ⍴)
  - the rename operator in relational algebra
  - the plastic ratio
  - Rho meson

=== Σσς (sigma) ===
- $\Sigma$ represents:
  - the summation operator
  - the covariance matrix
  - the set of terminal symbols in a formal grammar
  - Mathematical surface
  - Sigma baryon
- $\sigma$ represents:
  - Stefan–Boltzmann constant in blackbody radiation
  - the divisor function in number theory
  - the real part of the complex variable $s = \sigma + i t$ in analytic number theory
  - the sign of a permutation in the theory of finite groups
  - the population standard deviation, a measure of spread in probability and statistics
  - a type of covalent bond in chemistry (sigma bond)
  - the selection operator in relational algebra
  - stress in mechanics
  - electrical conductivity
  - area density
  - Cross section
    - nuclear cross section
  - the Sigmoid function
  - surface charge density for microparticles
  - standard deviation of a random variable in statistics
  - Spectrum of a matrix
  - Spin

=== Ττ (tau) ===
- $\tau$ represents:
  - torque, the net rotational force in mechanics
  - the elementary tau lepton in particle physics
  - a mean lifetime, of an exponential decay or spontaneous emission process
  - the time constant of any device, such as an RC circuit
  - proper time in relativity
  - Tau (mathematics) is the ratio of a circle's circumference to its radius, with value $2\pi$ (6.283 185...).
    - one Turn (angle) measured in radians
  - Kendall tau rank correlation coefficient, a measure of rank correlation in statistics
  - Ramanujan's tau function in number theory
  - shear stress in continuum mechanics
  - a type variable in type theories, such as the simply typed lambda calculus
  - path tortuosity in reservoir engineering
  - in topology, a given topology
  - the tau in biochemistry, a protein associated to microtubules
  - the number of divisors of highly composite numbers (sequence A000005 in the OEIS)
  - precision ($\tau^2$), the reciprocal of variance, in statistics
  - an old scale for the proton NMR chemical shift, setting tetramethylsilane = 10 ppm, and with the opposite sign convention to δ (low field shifts = lower)

=== ϒυ (upsilon) ===
- $\Upsilon$ (U+03D2) represents:
  - the upsilon meson

=== Φφ (phi) ===
- $\Phi$ represents:
  - the work function in physics; the energy required by a photon to remove an electron from the surface of a metal
  - magnetic flux or electric flux
  - the cumulative distribution function of the normal distribution in statistics
  - phenyl functional group in organic chemistry (pseudoelement symbol)
  - the reciprocal of the golden ratio (represented by $\phi$, below), also represented as $1/\phi$
  - the value of the integration of information in a system (based on integrated information theory)
  - Geopotential
  - Alternative symbol for a wave function in quantum mechanics

Note: The empty set symbol ∅ looks similar, but is unrelated to the Greek letter.

- $\phi$ or $\varphi$ represents:
  - the golden ratio 1.618... in mathematics, art, and architecture
  - Euler's totient function in number theory
  - the argument of a complex number in mathematics
  - the value of a plane angle in physics and mathematics
  - the angle to the z axis in spherical coordinates (mathematics)
  - epoch or phase difference between two waves or vectors
  - the angle to the x axis in the xy-plane in spherical or cylindrical coordinates (physics)
  - latitude in geodesy
  - radiant flux
  - neutron flux
  - Potential energy
  - electric potential
  - a scalar field in quantum field theory
  - the probability density function of the normal distribution in statistics
  - the Veblen functions

=== Χχ (chi) ===
- $\chi$ represents:
  - the chi distribution in statistics ($\chi^2$ is the more frequently encountered chi-squared distribution)
  - the chromatic number of a graph in graph theory
  - the Euler characteristic in algebraic topology
  - electronegativity in the periodic table
  - the Fourier transform of a linear response function
  - a character in mathematics; especially a Dirichlet character in number theory
  - sometimes the mole fraction
  - a characteristic or indicator function in mathematics
  - the magnetic susceptibility of a material in physics
  - the fission neutron energy spectrum in neutron transport

=== Ψψ (psi) ===
- $\Psi$ represents:
  - a quaternary combinator in combinatory logic
  - a symbol for psychology
  - the wave function in the Schrödinger equation of quantum mechanics
- $\psi$ represents:
  - the J/psi mesons in particle physics
  - the stream function in fluid dynamics
  - the reciprocal Fibonacci constant
  - the second Chebyshev function in number theory
  - the polygamma function in mathematics
  - the supergolden ratio
  - In circadian physiology, ψ represents the phase relationship between a zeitgeber and a biological rhythm.
  - In virology the ψ site is a viral packaging signal.
  - Water potential in movement of water between plant cells.

=== Ωω (omega) ===
- $\Omega$ represents:
  - Absolute infinite
  - the SI unit measure of electrical resistance, the ohm
  - the right ascension of the ascending node (RAAN) or Longitude of the ascending node in astronomy and orbital mechanics
  - the omega constant 0.5671432904097838729999686622...
  - an asymptotic lower bound notation related to big O notation
  - in probability theory and statistical mechanics, the support
  - a solid angle
  - the omega baryon
  - the arithmetic function counting a number's prime factors counted with multiplicity
  - the density parameter in cosmology
  - the first uncountable ordinal (also written as ω_{1})
  - Chaitin's constant for a given computer program
  - the vacuum state in quantum field theory
- $\omega$ represents:
  - angular velocity / radian frequency (rad/sec)
  - the argument of periapsis in astronomy and orbital mechanics
  - a complex cube root of unity — the other is $\omega^2$ — (used to describe various ways of calculating the discrete Fourier transform)
  - the differentiability class (i.e. $C^\omega$) for functions that are infinitely differentiable because they are complex analytic
  - the first infinite ordinal
  - the omega meson
  - the set of natural numbers in set theory (although $\mathbb{N}$ or N is more common in other areas of mathematics)
  - an asymptotic dominant notation related to big O notation
  - in probability theory, a possible outcome of an experiment
  - the arithmetic function counting a number's distinct prime factors
  - the symbol ϖ, a graphic variant of π, is sometimes construed as omega with a bar over it; see π
  - the unsaturated fats nomenclature in biochemistry (e.g. ω−3 fatty acids)
  - the first uncountable ordinal $\omega_1$ (also written as Ω)
  - the clique number (number of vertices in a maximum clique) of a graph in graph theory

== See also ==
- Blackboard bold letters used in mathematics
- English pronunciation of Greek letters
- Latin letters used in mathematics, science, and engineering
- List of letters used in mathematics, science, and engineering
- Glossary of mathematical symbols
- Mathematical Alphanumeric Symbols (a Unicode block)
- Mathematical notation
- Greek alphabet
- Homoglyph
