= 𝔹 =

$\mathbb{B}$ is the blackboard bold letter B. It can refer to:

- The n-dimensional ball $\mathbb{B}^n$
- A Boolean domain
