= Latin letters used in mathematics, science, and engineering =

Many letters of the Latin alphabet, both capital and small, are used in mathematics, science, and engineering to denote by convention specific or abstracted constants, variables of a certain type, units, multipliers, or physical entities. Certain letters, when combined with special formatting, take on special meaning.

Below is an alphabetical list of the letters of the alphabet with some of their uses. The field in which the convention applies is mathematics unless otherwise noted.

== Typographical variation ==
Some common conventions:

- Most symbols are written in italics.
- Vectors can be denoted in boldface.
- Sets of numbers are typically bold or blackboard bold.

Typographical variations of Latin letters in Unicode
Name	Sub-type	Alphabet
Double-struck	Mathematical	𝔸 𝔹 ℂ 𝔻 𝔼 𝔽 𝔾 ℍ 𝕀 𝕁 𝕂 𝕃 𝕄 ℕ 𝕆 ℙ ℚ ℝ 𝕊 𝕋 𝕌 𝕍 𝕎 𝕏 𝕐 ℤ
Double-struck	Mathematical	𝕒 𝕓 𝕔 𝕕 𝕖 𝕗 𝕘 𝕙 𝕚 𝕛 𝕜 𝕝 𝕞 𝕟 𝕠 𝕡 𝕢 𝕣 𝕤 𝕥 𝕦 𝕧 𝕨 𝕩 𝕪 𝕫
Double-struck	Italic	ⅆ ⅇ ⅈ ⅉ ⅅ
Script/Calligraphy	Mathematical	𝒜 ℬ 𝒞 𝒟 ℰ ℱ 𝒢 ℋ ℐ 𝒥 𝒦 ℒ ℳ 𝒩 𝒪 𝒫 𝒬 ℛ 𝒮 𝒯 𝒰 𝒱 𝒲 𝒳 𝒴 𝒵
Script/Calligraphy	Mathematical	𝒶 𝒷 𝒸 𝒹 ℯ 𝒻 ℊ 𝒽 𝒾 𝒿 𝓀 𝓁 𝓂 𝓃 ℴ 𝓅 𝓆 𝓇 𝓈 𝓉 𝓊 𝓋 𝓌 𝓍 𝓎 𝓏
Script/Calligraphy	Mathematical Bold	𝓐 𝓑 𝓒 𝓓 𝓔 𝓕 𝓖 𝓗 𝓘 𝓙 𝓚 𝓛 𝓜 𝓝 𝓞 𝓟 𝓠 𝓡 𝓢 𝓣 𝓤 𝓥 𝓦 𝓧 𝓨 𝓩
Script/Calligraphy	Mathematical Bold	𝓪 𝓫 𝓬 𝓭 𝓮 𝓯 𝓰 𝓱 𝓲 𝓳 𝓴 𝓵 𝓶 𝓷 𝓸 𝓹 𝓺 𝓻 𝓼 𝓽 𝓾 𝓿 𝔀 𝔁 𝔂 𝔃
Fraktur	Mathematical	𝔄 𝔅 ℭ 𝔇 𝔈 𝔉 𝔊 ℌ ℑ 𝔍 𝔎 𝔏 𝔐 𝔑 𝔒 𝔓 𝔔 ℜ 𝔖 𝔗 𝔘 𝔙 𝔚 𝔛 𝔜 ℨ
Fraktur	Mathematical	𝔞 𝔟 𝔠 𝔡 𝔢 𝔣 𝔤 𝔥 𝔦 𝔧 𝔨 𝔩 𝔪 𝔫 𝔬 𝔭 𝔮 𝔯 𝔰 𝔱 𝔲 𝔳 𝔴 𝔵 𝔶 𝔷
Fraktur	Mathematical Bold	𝕬 𝕭 𝕮 𝕯 𝕰 𝕱 𝕲 𝕳 𝕴 𝕵 𝕶 𝕷 𝕸 𝕹 𝕺 𝕻 𝕼 𝕽 𝕾 𝕿 𝖀 𝖁 𝖂 𝖃 𝖄 𝖅
Fraktur	Mathematical Bold	𝖆 𝖇 𝖈 𝖉 𝖊 𝖋 𝖌 𝖍 𝖎 𝖏 𝖐 𝖑 𝖒 𝖓 𝖔 𝖕 𝖖 𝖗 𝖘 𝖙 𝖚 𝖛 𝖜 𝖝 𝖞 𝖟
Mono-space	Mathematical	𝙰 𝙱 𝙲 𝙳 𝙴 𝙵 𝙶 𝙷 𝙸 𝙹 𝙺 𝙻 𝙼 𝙽 𝙾 𝙿 𝚀 𝚁 𝚂 𝚃 𝚄 𝚅 𝚆 𝚇 𝚈 𝚉
Mono-space	Mathematical	𝚊 𝚋 𝚌 𝚍 𝚎 𝚏 𝚐 𝚑 𝚒 𝚓 𝚔 𝚕 𝚖 𝚗 𝚘 𝚙 𝚚 𝚛 𝚜 𝚝 𝚞 𝚟 𝚠 𝚡 𝚢 𝚣

== Aa ==
- A represents:
  - the first point of a triangle
  - the digit "ten" in hexadecimal and other positional numeral systems with a radix of 11 or greater
  - the unit ampere for electric current in physics
  - the area of a figure
  - the mass number or nucleon number of an element in chemistry
  - the Helmholtz free energy of a closed thermodynamic system of constant pressure and temperature
  - a vector potential, in electromagnetics it can refer to the magnetic vector potential
  - with a subscript, an alternating group on that many objects
  - an Abelian group in abstract algebra
  - the Glaisher–Kinkelin constant
  - atomic weight, denoted by A_{r}
  - work in classical mechanics
  - the pre-exponential factor in the Arrhenius Equation
  - electron affinity
  - A blood type
- $\mathbb{A}$ represents the algebraic numbers or affine space in algebraic geometry.
  - A spectral type
- a represents:
  - the first side of a triangle (opposite point A)
  - the scale factor of the expanding universe in cosmology
  - the acceleration in mechanics equations
  - the first constant in a linear equation
  - a constant in a polynomial
  - the unit are for area (100 m^{2})
  - the unit prefix atto (10^{−18})
  - the first term in a sequence or series
  - Reflectance

== Bb ==
- B represents:
  - the digit "11" in hexadecimal and other positional numeral systems with a radix of 12 or greater
  - the second point of a triangle
  - a ball (also denoted by ℬ ($\mathcal{B}$) or $\mathbb{B}$)
  - a basis of a vector space or of a filter (both also denoted by ℬ ($\mathcal{B}$))
  - in econometrics and time-series statistics it is often used for the backshift or lag operator, the formal parameter of the lag polynomial
  - the magnetic field, denoted $\textbf{B}$ or $\vec{B}$
- B with various subscripts represents several variations of Brun's constant and Betti numbers; it can also be used to mean the Bernoulli numbers.
  - B meson
  - A blood type
  - Boron
  - Buoyancy
  - Bulk modulus
  - Luminance
  - A spectral type
- b represents:
  - the second side of a triangle (opposite point B)
  - the impact parameter in nuclear scattering
  - the second constant in a linear equation
  - usually with an index, sometimes with an arrow over it, a basis vector
  - a breadth
  - the molality of a solution
  - Bottom quark
  - Barn (10^{−24} cm^{2})

== Cc ==
- C represents:
  - the third point of a triangle
  - the digit "12" in hexadecimal and other positional numeral systems with a radix of 13 or greater
  - the unit coulomb of electrical charge
  - capacitance in electrical theory
  - with indices denoting the number of combinations, a binomial coefficient
  - together with a degree symbol (°), the Celsius measurement of temperature = °C
  - the circumference of a circle or other closed curve
  - with a subscript, a cycle on that many vertices
  - with a subscript, a cyclic group of that order
  - the complement of a set (lowercase c and the symbol ∁ are also used)
  - an arbitrary category
  - the number concentration*
  - Carbon
  - Heat capacity
  - The C programming language
  - Cunningham correction factor
- $\mathbb{C}$ represents the set of complex numbers.
- A vertically elongated C with an integer subscript n sometimes denotes the n-th coefficient of a formal power series.
- c represents:
  - the unit prefix centi (10^{−2})
  - the amount concentration in chemistry
  - the speed of light in vacuum
  - the third side of a triangle (opposite corner C)
  - the third constant in a linear equation
  - a constant in a polynomial
  - Charm quark
  - Speed of sound
  - Specific heat capacity
- Lowercase Fraktur $\mathfrak{c}$ denotes the cardinality of the set of real numbers (the "continuum"), or, equivalently, of the power set of natural numbers.

== Dd ==
- D represents
  - the digit "13" in hexadecimal and other positional numeral systems with a radix of 14 or greater
  - diffusion coefficient or diffusivity in dimensions of [distance^{2}/time]
  - the differential operator in Euler's calculus notation
  - with a subscript, a dihedral group of that order or a dihedral group on a regular polygon of that many sides, depending on the convention chosen
  - dissociation energy
  - Dimension
  - Deuterium
  - Electric displacement
  - D meson
  - Density
- d represents
  - the differential operator
  - the unit day of time (86,400 s)
  - the difference in an arithmetic sequence
  - a metric operator/function
  - the diameter of a circle
  - the unit prefix deci (10^{−1})
  - a thickness
  - a distance
  - Down quark
  - Infinitesimal increment in calculus
  - Density

== Ee ==
- E represents:
  - the digit "14" in hexadecimal and other positional numeral systems with a radix of 15 or greater
  - an exponent in decimal numbers. For example, 1.2E3 is 1.2×10^{3} or 1200
  - the set of edges in a graph or matroid
  - the unit prefix exa (10^{18})
  - energy in physics
  - electric field denoted $\textbf{E}$ or $\vec{E}$
  - electromotive force (denoted $\mathcal{E}$ and measured in volts), refers to voltage
  - an event (as in P(E), which reads "the probability P of event E occurring")
  - in statistics, the expected value of a random variable, sometimes as $\mathbb{E}$
  - E_{k} represents kinetic energy
  - (Arrhenius) activation energy, denoted E_{a} or E_{A}
  - ionization energy, denoted E_{i}
  - electron affinity, denoted E_{ea}
  - dissociation energy, denoted E_{d}
  - Young's modulus, the stiffness of a solid material under tension or axial compression
- e represents:
  - Euler's number, a transcendental number equal to 2.71828182845... which is used as the base for natural logarithms
  - a vector of unit length, especially in the direction of one of the coordinates axes
  - the elementary charge in physics
  - an electron, usually denoted e^{−} to distinguish against a positron e^{+}
  - the eccentricity of a conic section
  - the identity element in a group
  - In a cartesian coordinate system, a unit vector in notations like $(\mathbf{\hat{e}}_x, \mathbf{\hat{e}}_y, \mathbf{\hat{e}}_z)$, or $(\mathbf{\hat{e}}_1, \mathbf{\hat{e}}_2, \mathbf{\hat{e}}_3)$

== Ff ==
- F represents
  - the digit "15" in hexadecimal and other positional numeral systems with a radix of 16 or greater
  - the unit farad of electrical capacity
  - the Helmholtz free energy of a closed thermodynamic system of constant pressure and temperature
  - together with a degree symbol (°) represents the Fahrenheit measurement of temperature = °F
  - Fluorine
  - A spectral type
- F represents
  - force in mechanics equations
  - _{p}F_{q} is a hypergeometric series
  - the probability distribution function in statistics
  - a Fibonacci number
  - an arbitrary functor
  - a field
  - an event space sigma algebra as part of a probability space, often as $\mathcal{F}$
- f represents:
  - the unit prefix femto (10^{−15})
- f represents:
  - the generic designation of a function
  - Friction

== Gg ==
- G represents
  - an arbitrary graph, as in: G(V,E)
  - an arbitrary group
  - the unit prefix giga (10^{9})
  - the Newtonian constant of gravitation
  - the Einstein tensor
  - the Gibbs energy
  - the centroid of a triangle
  - Catalan's constant
  - weight measured in newtons
  - Green's function
  - a spectral type
- g represents:
  - the generic designation of a second function
  - the acceleration due to gravity on Earth
  - a unit of mass, the gram (also gramme)
  - Gravitational field, denoted g
  - Metric tensor (general relativity)
  - Gluon

== Hh ==
- H represents:
  - an arbitrary subgraph
  - an arbitrary subgroup
  - a Hilbert space
  - the unit henry of magnetic inductance
  - the homology and cohomology functor
  - the enthalpy
  - the (Shannon) entropy of information
  - the orthocenter of a triangle
  - a partial sum of the harmonic series
  - Auxiliary magnetic field, denoted $\boldsymbol{H}$
  - Hamiltonian in quantum mechanics
  - Hankel function
  - Heaviside step function
  - Higgs boson
  - Hydrogen
  - Set of quaternions
  - Hat matrix
- H_{0} is either the Hubble constant; or the Dimensionless Hubble parameter of (100 h km·s^{−1}·Mpc^{−1}, with h being the associated error.
- $\mathbb{H}$ represents the quaternions (after William Rowan Hamilton).
- ΔH^{‡} represents the standard enthalpy of activation in the Eyring equation.
- ℋ ($\mathcal{H}$) represents the Hamiltonian in Hamiltonian mechanics.
- h represents:
  - the class number in algebraic number theory
  - a small increment in the argument of a function
  - the unit hour for time (3600 s)
  - the Planck constant (6.626 069(57)× 10^{−34} J·s)
  - the unit prefix hecto (10^{2})
  - the generic designation of a third function
  - the altitude of a triangle
  - a height
  - Spherical Hankel function

== Ii ==
- I represents:
  - the closed unit interval, which contains all real numbers from 0 to 1, inclusive
  - the identity matrix
  - the Irradiance
  - the moment of inertia
  - intensity in physics, typically the vector field I
  - Luminous intensity, typically I_{v}
  - the incenter of a triangle
  - the electric current
  - ionization energy, denoted I
- I represents:
  - the index of an indexed family
  - Iodine
- i represents:
  - the imaginary unit, a complex number that is the square root of −1
  - Imaginary quaternion unit
  - a subscript to denote the ith term (that is, a general term or index) in a sequence or list
  - the index to the elements of a vector, written as a subscript after the vector name
  - the index to the rows of a matrix, written as the first subscript after the matrix name
  - an index of summation using the sigma notation
  - the unit vector in Cartesian coordinates going in the x-direction, usually bold i

== Jj ==
- J represents:
  - the unit joule of energy
  - the current density in electromagnetism denoted $\boldsymbol{J}$
  - the radiosity in thermal mechanics
  - the moment of inertia
  - Total angular momentum quantum number
  - Bessel function of the first kind
  - Impulse
- J represents:
  - the scheme of a diagram in category theory
- j represents:
  - the index to the columns of a matrix, written as the second subscript after the matrix name
  - in electrical engineering, the principal cube root of 1: $-\frac{1}{2}+\frac{1}{2}i \sqrt 3$
  - the unit vector in Cartesian coordinates going in the y-direction, usually bold j
  - Electrical current density
  - Spherical Bessel function of the first kind
  - Imaginary unit in electrical engineering (where i represents current)
  - Unit vector for the second imaginary dimension in the quaternion number system (bold j)

== Kk ==
- K represents:
  - the temperature unit kelvin
  - the functors of K-theory
  - an unspecified (real) constant
  - a field in algebra
  - with a subscript, a complete graph on that many vertices
  - the area of a polygon
  - kinetic energy
  - Kaon
  - Potassium
  - Sectional curvature
  - A spectral type
- k represents
  - the unit prefix kilo- (10^{3})
  - the Boltzmann constant, often represented as k_{B} to avoid confusion
  - the angular wavenumber of the wave equation, the magnitude of the wave vector k
  - an integer, e.g. a dummy variable in summations, or an index of a matrix
  - an unspecified (real) constant
  - the spring constant of Hooke's law
  - the spacetime curvature from the Friedmann equations in cosmology
  - the rate constant (coefficient)
  - the unit vector in Cartesian coordinates going in the z-direction, usually bold k
  - Unit vector for the third dimension in the quaternion number system (bold k)
  - Unit vector in the z direction

== Ll ==
- L represents:
  - length, used often in quantum mechanics as the size of an infinite square well
  - angular momentum
  - the unit of volume the litre
  - the radiance
  - the space of all integrable real (or complex) functions
  - the space of linear maps, as in L(E,F) or L(E) = End(E)
  - the likelihood function
  - a formal language
  - the operator creating a line graph
  - the lag operator in statistics
  - a Lucas number
  - the Lagrange function
  - Inductance in electromagnetism (measured in henries)
  - A spectral type
- l represents:
  - the unit of volume the litre (often avoided due to confusion with the number 1 and uppercase letter I)
  - the length of a side of a rectangle or a cuboid (e.g. V = lwh; A = lw)
  - the last term of a sequence or series (e.g. S_{n} = n(a+l)/2)
  - the orbital angular momentum quantum number
- ℒ ($\mathcal{L}$) represents:
  - the Lagrangian (sometimes just L)
  - exposure (in particle physics)
- ℓ represents:
  - Mean free path

== Mm ==
- M represents:
  - a manifold
  - a metric space
  - a matroid
  - the unit prefix mega- (10^{6})
  - the Madelung constant for crystal structures held by ionic bonding
  - the moment of force
    - Torque when denoted as moment of force
  - molar mass
  - molar mass constant, denoted M_{u}
  - relative molecular mass, denoted M_{r}
  - Magnetization vector field M
  - A spectral type
- m represents:
  - the number of rows in a matrix
  - atomic mass
  - atomic mass constant denoted m_{u}
  - the slope in a linear regression or in any line
  - the mass in mechanics equations
  - the unit metre of length
  - the unit prefix milli (10^{−3})
  - a median of a triangle
  - the overall order of reaction
  - Magnitude
  - Minute (but the SI abbreviation is "min")
  - Slope
  - Magnetic moment in a magnetization field

== Nn ==
- N represents
  - the unit newton of force
  - the nine-point center of a triangle
  - Bessel function of the second kind (uncommon)
  - Nitrogen
  - Normal distribution
  - Normal vector
- N represents
  - the neutron number
  - The number of particles of a thermodynamical system
- N_{A} represents the Avogadro constant
- $\mathbb{N}$ represents the natural numbers.
- n represents
  - A neutron, which may be shown as n, n^{0} or ^{1}_{0}n
  - the unit prefix nano (10^{−9})
- n represents
  - the number of columns in a matrix
  - the "number of" in algebraic equations
  - the number density of particles in a volume
  - the index of the nth term of a sequence or series (e.g. t_{n} = a + (n − 1)d)
  - the principal quantum number
  - the amount of a given substance
  - the number concentration
  - the overall order of reaction
  - Refractive index of a material
  - Spherical Bessel function of the second kind (uncommon)
  - An integer

== Oo ==
- O represents
  - the order of asymptotic behavior of a function (upper bound); see Big O notation
  - $(0,0,\ldots,0)$ — the Origin of the coordinate system in Cartesian coordinates
  - the circumcenter of a triangle or other cyclic polygon, or more generally the center of a circle
  - A blood type
  - Oxygen
  - A spectral type
- o represents
  - the order of asymptotic behavior of a function (strict upper bound); see Little o notation (also known as "small o notation")
  - the order of an element in a group
- $\mathbb{O}$ represents
  - the octonions

== Pp ==
- P represents:
  - the pressure in physics equations
  - the unit prefix peta (10^{15})
  - probability in statistics and statistical mechanics
  - an arbitrary point in geometry
  - with a subscript, a path on that many vertices
  - power, measured in watts
  - Active power in electrical engineering
  - weight measured in newtons
  - Legendre polynomial
  - Phosphorus
  - Polarization
- $\mathbb{P}$ represents
  - the prime numbers
  - Projective space
  - Projection (linear algebra)
  - a probability (as in P(E), which reads "the probability P of event E happening")
- p represents
  - a prime number
  - the numerator of a fraction
  - the unit prefix pico (10^{−12})
  - a proton, often p^{+} or 1
    1 p
  - the linear momentum in physics equations
  - the perimeter of a triangle or other polygon
  - generalized momentum
  - the pressure in physics equations
    - Sound pressure
  - Electric dipole moment

== Qq ==
- Q represents:
  - the unit prefix quetta- (10^{30})
  - heat energy
  - electroweak charge, denoted Q_{W}
  - Reactive power in electrical engineering
  - Volumetric flow rate
- $\mathbb{Q}$ represents the rational numbers
- q represents:
  - the unit prefix quecto- (10^{−30})
  - a second prime number
  - the denominator of a fraction
  - the quotient resulting from integer division
  - the deceleration parameter in cosmology
  - electric charge of a particle
  - a generalized coordinate
  - Quark

== Rr ==
- R represents:
  - the unit prefix ronna- (10^{27})
  - the Ricci tensor
  - the circumradius of a cyclic polygon such as a triangle
  - an arbitrary relation
  - Riemann curvature tensor
  - Electrical resistance
  - Molar gas constant
- $\mathbb{R}$ represents the set of real numbers and various algebraic structures built upon the set of real numbers, such as $\mathbb{R}^n$.
- r represents:
  - the unit prefix ronto- (10^{−27})
  - the radius of a circle or sphere
  - radial distance in a polar coordinate system or spherical coordinate system
  - the inradius of a triangle or other tangential polygon
  - the ratio of a geometric series (e.g. ar^{n−1})
  - the remainder resulting from integer division
  - the separation of two objects, for example in Coulomb's law
  - a position vector
  - the rate of concentration change of B (due to chemical reaction) denoted r_{B}

== Ss ==
- S represents
  - a sum
  - the unit siemens of electric conductance
  - the unit sphere (with superscript denoting dimension)
  - the scattering matrix
  - entropy
  - action in joule-seconds
  - Apparent power in electrical engineering
  - Area
  - Spin operator
  - Sulfur
  - Symmetric group
    - with a subscript, a symmetric group on that many objects
- s represents:
  - an arclength
  - a path length
  - the displacement in mechanics equations
  - the unit second of time
  - a complex variable s = σ + i t in analytic number theory
  - the semiperimeter of a triangle or other polygon
  - Strange quark
  - Specific entropy
- 𝒮 ($\mathcal{S}$) represents a system's action in physics
- $\mathbb{S}$ represents
  - the sedenions

== Tt ==
- T represents:
  - the top element of a lattice
  - a tree (a special kind of graph)
  - temperature in physics equations
  - the unit tesla of magnetic flux density
  - the unit prefix tera (10^{12})
  - the stress–energy tensor
  - tension in physics
  - an arbitrary monad
  - the time it takes for one oscillation
  - kinetic energy
  - Torque
  - A spectral type
  - Tritium
  - Period, the reciprocal of frequency
- t represents:
  - time in graphs, functions or equations
  - variable of integration
  - a term in a sequence or series (e.g. t_{n} = t_{n−1} + 5)
  - the imaginary part of the complex variable s = σ + it in analytic number theory
  - the sample statistic resulting from a Student's t-test
  - the half life of a quantity, denoted as t_{1/2}
  - Top quark
- $\mathbb{T}$ represents
  - the trigintaduonions

== Uu ==
- U represents:
  - a U-set which is a set of uniqueness
  - a unitary operator
  - in thermodynamics, the internal energy of a system
  - a forgetful functor
  - Potential energy
  - Uranium
- U(n) represents the unitary group of degree n
- ∪ represents the union operator
- u represents:
  - the initial velocity in mechanics equations
  - Up quark

== Vv ==
- V represents:
  - Vanadium
  - the unit volt of voltage
  - the set of vertices in a graph
  - a vector space
  - potential energy
  - molar volume denoted by V_{m}
- v represents
  - the final velocity in mechanics equations
  - frequency, especially when referring to electromagnetic waves
  - a specific volume in classical mechanics
  - the rate of concentration change of B (due to chemical reaction) denoted v_{B}
  - the rate of reaction based on amount concentration denoted v or v_{c}
  - the rate of reaction based on number concentration denoted v or v_{C}

== Ww ==
- W represents:
  - the unit watt of power
  - work, both mechanical and thermodynamical
  - in thermodynamics, the number of possible quantum states in Boltzmann's entropy formula
  - weight measured in newtons
  - Lambert's W function
  - Tungsten
  - W boson
  - Work function
  - Wiener process
- w represents:
  - the coordinate on the fourth axis in four-dimensional space
  - work in classical mechanics
  - Width

== Xx ==
- X represents
  - a random variable
  - a triangle center
  - the first part of a bipartite graph
- Ẋ represents
  - the rate of change of quantity X
- x represents
  - a realized value of a random variable
  - an unknown variable, most often (but not always) from the set of real numbers, while a complex unknown would rather be called z, and an integer by a letter like m from the middle of the alphabet
  - the coordinate on the first or horizontal axis in a Cartesian coordinate system, or the viewport in a graph or window in computer graphics; the abscissa
    - Axis in the direction of travel of an aerospace vehicle (longitudinal axis)
  - a mole fraction
  - Variable to be determined in an algebraic equation
  - A vector in linear algebra

== Yy ==
- Y represents:
  - the unit prefix yotta- (10^{24})
  - Bessel function of the second kind
  - the second part of a bipartite graph
  - Yttrium
  - Gross domestic product
- Y represents:
  - a second random variable
- y represents:
  - the unit prefix yocto- (10^{−24})
  - a realized value of a second random variable
  - a second unknown variable
  - the coordinate on the second or vertical axis (backward axis in three dimensions) in a Cartesian coordinate system, or in the viewport of a graph or window in computer graphics; the ordinate
    - The port-starboard axis (transverse axis) of an aerospace vehicle
  - a mole fraction

== Zz ==
- Z represents:
  - the unit prefix zetta (10^{21})
  - the atomic number or proton number of an element in chemistry
  - a standardized normal random variable in probability theory and statistics
  - Partition function
  - in meteorology, the radar reflectivity factor
  - Electrical impedance
  - Z boson
  - Compressibility factor
- $\mathbb{Z}$ represents the integers
- z represents:
  - the unit prefix zepto (10^{−21})
  - the coordinate on the third or vertical axis in three dimensional space
    - The vertical axis or altitude in an aerospace vehicle
  - the view depth in computer graphics, see also "z-buffering"
  - the argument of a complex function, or any other variable used to represent a complex value
  - in astronomy, wavelength redshift
  - a third unknown variable
  - the collision frequency of A with A is denoted z_{A}(A)
  - the collision frequency factor is denoted z_{AB}

== See also ==
- Blackboard bold letters used in mathematics
- Greek letters used in mathematics, science, and engineering
- List of letters used in mathematics, science, and engineering
- Mathematical Alphanumeric Symbols
- Glossary of mathematical symbols
