= Quotient (disambiguation) =

Quotient is the result of division in mathematics.

Quotient may also refer to:

== Mathematics ==
- Quotient set by an equivalence relation
- Quotient group
- Quotient ring
- Quotient module
- Quotient space (linear algebra)
- Quotient space (topology), by an equivalence relation in the case of a topological space
- Quotient (universal algebra)
- Quotient object in a category
- Quotient category
- Quotient of a formal language
- Quotient type

== Other uses ==
- Intelligence quotient, a psychological measurement of human intelligence
- Quotient Technology, the parent company of Coupons.com
- Quotients (EP), music by the band Hyland
- Runs Per Wicket Ratio, a statistic used to rank teams in league tables in cricket, also known as Quotient
