= Partial differential =

Mathematical symbol used for partial derivatives and other concepts

∂o

Partial differential
- In Unicode: U+2202 ∂ PARTIAL DIFFERENTIAL

The character ∂ (Unicode: U+2202) is a stylized cursive d mainly used as a mathematical symbol, usually to denote a partial derivative such as ${\partial z}/{\partial x}$ (read as "the partial derivative of z with respect to x"). It is also used for boundary of a set, the boundary operator in a chain complex, and the conjugate of the Dolbeault operator on smooth differential forms over a complex manifold.

It should be distinguished from other similar-looking symbols such as lowercase Greek letter delta (δ) or the lowercase Latin letter eth (ð).

== History ==
The symbol was introduced originally in 1770 by Nicolas de Condorcet, who used it for a partial differential, and adopted for the partial derivative by Adrien-Marie Legendre in 1786. It represents a specialized cursive type of the letter d, just as the integral sign originates as a specialized type of a long s (first used in print by Leibniz in 1686). Use of the symbol was discontinued by Legendre, but it was taken up again by Carl Gustav Jacob Jacobi in 1841, whose usage became widely adopted.

== Names and coding ==
The symbol is variously referred to as "partial", "curly d" or "Jacobi's delta", or as "del" (but this name is also used for the "nabla" symbol ∇). It may also be pronounced simply "dee", "partial dee", "doh", "dow", "die", or "diddly".

The Unicode character U+2202 ∂ PARTIAL DIFFERENTIAL is accessed by HTML entities &#8706; or &part;, and the equivalent LaTeX symbol (Computer Modern glyph: $\partial$) is accessed by \partial.

== Uses ==
∂ is also used to denote the following:

- The Jacobian $\frac{\partial(x, y, z)}{\partial(u, v, w)}$.
- The boundary of a set in topology.
- The boundary operator on a chain complex in homological algebra.
- The boundary operator of a differential graded algebra.
- The conjugate of the Dolbeault operator on complex differential forms.
- The boundary ∂(S) of a set of vertices S in a graph is the set of edges leaving S, which defines a cut.

== See also ==
- d'Alembert operator
- Differentiable programming
- Differential operator § Notations
- List of mathematical symbols
- Notation for differentiation
- 𝒹 (Unicode MATHEMATICAL SCRIPT SMALL D)
- ꝺ (lowercase d in Insular script)
- δ (lowercase Greek Delta)
- д (lowercase Cyrillic De, looks similar when italicized in some typefaces)
