= Blackboard bold =

Typeface style used in mathematics

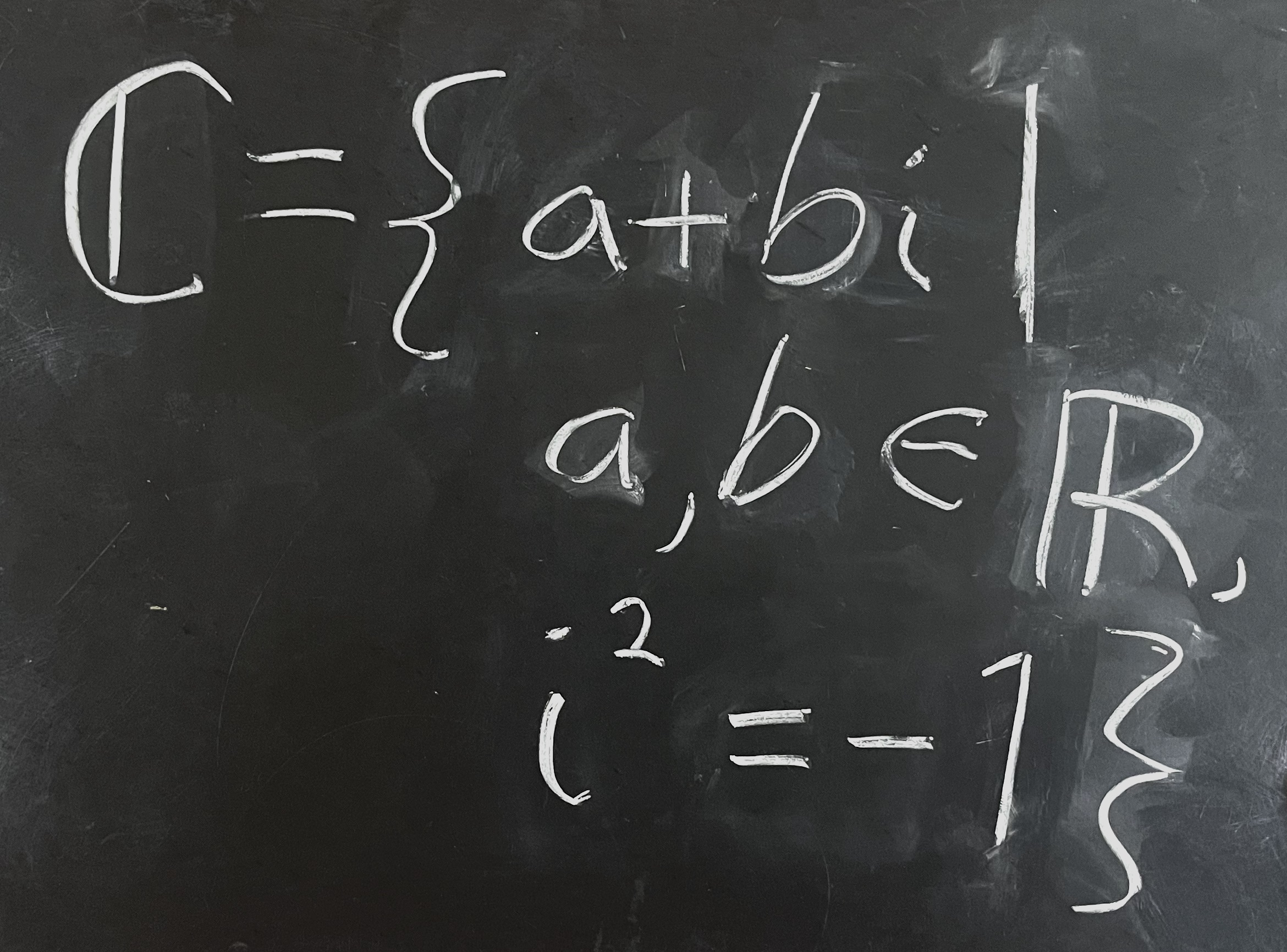
Blackboard bold $\C$ and $\R$ written on a blackboard

Blackboard bold is a style of writing bold symbols on a blackboard by doubling certain strokes, commonly used in mathematical lectures, and the derived style of typeface used in printed mathematical texts. The style is most commonly used to represent the number sets $\N$ (natural numbers), $\Z$ (integers), $\Q$ (rational numbers), $\R$ (real numbers), and $\C$ (complex numbers).

To imitate a bold typeface on a typewriter, a character can be typed over itself (called double-striking); symbols thus produced are called double-struck, and this name is sometimes adopted for blackboard bold symbols, for instance in Unicode grapheme names.

In typography, a typeface with characters that are not solid is called inline, handtooled, or open face.

== History ==
Typewritten lecture notes by Gunning (1966), showing "blackboard bold" style R and C achieved by double-striking each letter with significant offset

Typewritten lecture notes by Narasimhan (1966), with "blackboard bold" style R and C achieved with an inline typewriter face

Traditionally, various symbols were indicated by boldface in print but on blackboards and in manuscripts "by wavy underscoring, or enclosure in a circle, or even by wavy overscoring".

Most typewriters have no dedicated bold characters at all. To produce a bold effect on a typewriter, a character can be double-struck with or without a small offset. By the mid-1960s, typewriter accessories such as the "Doublebold" could automatically double-strike every character while engaged. While this method makes a character bolder, and can effectively emphasize words or passages, in isolation a double-struck character is not always clearly different from its single-struck counterpart.

Blackboard bold originated from the attempt to write bold symbols on typewriters and blackboards that were legible but distinct, perhaps starting in the late 1950s in France, and then taking hold at the Princeton University mathematics department in the early 1960s. Mathematical authors began typing faux-bold letters by double-striking them with a significant offset or over-striking them with the letter I, creating new symbols such as IR, IN, CC, or ZZ; at the blackboard, lecturers began writing bold symbols with certain doubled strokes. The notation caught on: blackboard bold spread from classroom to classroom and is now used around the world.

A page from Loomis & Sternberg (1968), showing an early example of "blackboard bold" style R and C in a printed book

The style made its way into print starting in the mid-1960s. Early examples include Robert Gunning and Hugo Rossi's Analytic Functions of Several Complex Variables (1965) and Lynn Loomis and Shlomo Sternberg's Advanced Calculus (1968). Initial adoption was sporadic, however, and most publishers continued using boldface. In 1979, Wiley recommended its authors avoid "double-backed shadow or outline letters, sometimes called blackboard bold", because they could not always be printed; in 1982, Wiley refused to include blackboard bold characters in mathematical books because the type was difficult and expensive to obtain.

Donald Knuth preferred boldface to blackboard bold and so did not include blackboard bold in the Computer Modern typeface that he created for the TeX mathematical typesetting system he first released in 1978. When Knuth's 1984 The TeXbook needed an example of blackboard bold for the index, he produced $\mathrm{I\!R}$ using the letters I and R with a negative space between; in 1988 Robert Messer extended this to a full set of "poor man's blackboard bold" macros, overtyping each capital letter with carefully placed I characters or vertical lines.

Not all mathematical authors were satisfied with such workarounds. The American Mathematical Society created a simple chalk-style blackboard bold typeface in 1985 to go with the AMS-TeX package created by Michael Spivak, accessed using the \Bbb command (for "blackboard bold"); in 1990, the AMS released an update with a new inline-style blackboard bold font intended to better match the Times New Roman font. Since then, a variety of other blackboard bold typefaces have been created, some following the style of traditional inline typefaces and others closer in form to letters drawn with chalk.

Unicode included the most common blackboard bold letters among the "Letterlike Symbols" in version 1.0 (1991), inherited from the Xerox Character Code Standard. Later versions of Unicode extended this set to all uppercase and lowercase Latin letters and a variety of other symbols, among the "Mathematical Alphanumeric Symbols".

In professionally typeset books, publishers and authors have gradually adopted blackboard bold, and its use is now commonplace, but some still use ordinary bold symbols. Some authors use blackboard bold letters on the blackboard or in manuscripts, but prefer an ordinary bold typeface in print; for example, Jean-Pierre Serre has used blackboard bold in lectures, but has consistently used ordinary bold for the same symbols in his published works. The Chicago Manual of Style's recommendation has evolved over time: In 1993, for the 14th edition, it advised that "blackboard bold should be confined to the classroom" (13.14); In 2003, for the 15th edition, it stated that "open-faced (blackboard) symbols are reserved for familiar systems of numbers" (14.12). The international standard ISO 80000-2:2019 lists R as the symbol for the real numbers but notes "the symbols IR and $\R$ are also used", and similarly for N, Z, Q, C, and P (prime numbers).

== Encoding ==
Blackboard bold variants; from top to bottom: "poor man's blackboard bold", AMSFonts mathbb based on Times, doublestroke package based on Computer Modern, STIX Two inspired by Monotype Special Alphabets 4

TeX, the standard typesetting system for mathematical texts, does not contain direct support for blackboard bold symbols, but the American Mathematical Society distributes the AMSFonts collection, loaded from the amssymb package, which includes a blackboard bold typeface for uppercase Latin letters accessed using \mathbb (e.g. \mathbb{R} produces $\mathbb{R}$).

In Unicode, a few of the more common blackboard bold characters (ℂ, ℍ, ℕ, ℙ, ℚ, ℝ, and ℤ) are encoded in the Basic Multilingual Plane (BMP) in the Letterlike Symbols (2100–214F) area, named DOUBLE-STRUCK CAPITAL C etc. The rest, however, are encoded outside the BMP, in Mathematical Alphanumeric Symbols (1D400–1D7FF), specifically from 1D538–1D550 (uppercase, excluding those encoded in the BMP), 1D552–1D56B (lowercase), and 1D7D8–1D7E1 (digits). Blackboard bold Arabic letters are encoded in Arabic Mathematical Alphabetic Symbols (1EE00–1EEFF), specifically 1EEA1–1EEBB.

== Usage ==
The following table shows all available Unicode blackboard bold characters.

The first column shows the letter as typically rendered by the LaTeX markup system. The second column shows the Unicode code point. The third column shows the Unicode symbol itself (which will only display correctly on browsers that support Unicode and have access to a suitable typeface). The fourth column describes some typical usage in mathematical texts. Some of the symbols (particularly $\mathbb{C}, \mathbb{Q}, \mathbb{R}$ and $\mathbb{Z}$) are nearly universal in their interpretation, while others are more varied in use.

| LaTeX | Unicode code point (hex) | Unicode symbol | Mathematics usage |
Uppercase Latin
| $\mathbb{A}$ | U+1D538 | 𝔸 | Represents affine space, $\mathbb{A}^n$, or the ring of adeles. Occasionally represents the algebraic numbers, the algebraic closure of $\mathbb{Q}$ (more commonly written $\overline{\mathbb{Q}}$ or Q̅), or the algebraic integers, an important subring of the algebraic numbers. |
| $\mathbb{B}$ | U+1D539 | 𝔹 | Sometimes represents a ball, a boolean domain, or the Brauer group of a field. |
| $\mathbb{C}$ | U+2102 | ℂ | Represents the set of complex numbers. |
| $\mathbb{D}$ | U+1D53B | 𝔻 | Represents the unit disk in the complex plane, for example as the conformal disk model of the hyperbolic plane. By generalisation $\mathbb{D}^n$ may mean the n-dimensional ball. Occasionally $\mathbb{D}$ may mean the decimal fractions (see number), split-complex numbers, or domain of discourse. |
| $\mathbb{E}$ | U+1D53C | 𝔼 | Represents the expected value of a random variable, or Euclidean space, or a field in a tower of fields, or the Eudoxus reals. |
| $\mathbb{F}$ | U+1D53D | 𝔽 | Represents a field. Often used for finite fields, with a subscript to indicate the order. Also represents a Hirzebruch surface or a free group, with a subscript to indicate the number of generators (or generating set, if infinite). |
| $\mathbb{G}$ | U+1D53E | 𝔾 | Represents a Grassmannian or a group, especially an algebraic group or group scheme. |
| $\mathbb{H}$ | U+210D | ℍ | Represents the quaternions (the H stands for Hamilton), or the upper half-plane, or hyperbolic space, or hyperhomology of a complex. Occasionally used to represent the null hypothesis ($\mathbb{H}_0$) and alternative hypothesis ($\mathbb{H}_1$) in hypothesis testing. |
| $\mathbb{I}$ | U+1D540 | 𝕀 | The closed unit interval or the ideal of polynomials vanishing on a subset. Occasionally the identity mapping on an algebraic structure, or an indicator function. The set of purely imaginary numbers (i.e., the set of all real multiples of the imaginary unit). |
| $\mathbb{J}$ | U+1D541 | 𝕁 | |
| $\mathbb{K}$ | U+1D542 | 𝕂 | Represents a field, K standing for German Körper (literally, 'body'; cf. French corps meaning 'body' or algebraic 'field'). May also denote a compact space. May also represent the set of computable numbers. |
| $\mathbb{L}$ | U+1D543 | 𝕃 | Represents the Lefschetz motive. See Motive (algebraic geometry). |
| $\mathbb{M}$ | U+1D544 | 𝕄 | Sometimes represents the monster group. The set of all m-by-n matrices is sometimes denoted $\mathbb{M}(m, n)$. In geometric algebra, represents the motor group of rigid motions. In functional programming and formal semantics, denotes the type constructor for a monad. |
| $\mathbb{N}$ | U+2115 | ℕ | Represents the set of natural numbers. May or may not include zero. |
| $\mathbb{O}$ | U+1D546 | 𝕆 | Represents the octonions. |
| $\mathbb{P}$ | U+2119 | ℙ | Represents projective space, the probability of an event, the prime numbers, a power set, the positive reals, the irrational numbers, or a forcing poset. |
| $\mathbb{Q}$ | U+211A | ℚ | Represents the set of rational numbers, Q standing for quotient. With a prime number subscript p, represents the field of p-adic numbers. |
| $\mathbb{R}$ | U+211D | ℝ | Represents the set of real numbers. |
| $\mathbb{S}$ | U+1D54A | 𝕊 | Represents a sphere, or the sphere spectrum, or occasionally the sedenions. |
| $\mathbb{T}$ | U+1D54B | 𝕋 | Represents the circle group, particularly the unit circle in the complex plane (and $\mathbb{T}^n$ the n-dimensional torus). Occasionally the trigintaduonions, or a Hecke algebra (Hecke denoted his operators as T_{n} or $\mathbb{T}_n$), or the tropical semiring, or twistor space. |
| $\mathbb{U}$ | U+1D54C | 𝕌 | |
| $\mathbb{V}$ | U+1D54D | 𝕍 | Represents a vector space or an affine variety generated by a set of polynomials, or variance of a random variable. |
| $\mathbb{W}$ | U+1D54E | 𝕎 | Represents the whole numbers (here in the sense of non-negative integers), which also are represented by $\mathbb{N}_0$. |
| $\mathbb{X}$ | U+1D54F | 𝕏 | Occasionally used to denote an arbitrary metric space. |
| $\mathbb{Y}$ | U+1D550 | 𝕐 | |
| $\mathbb{Z}$ | U+2124 | ℤ | Represents the set of integers, Z standing for German Zahl (number). With a positive integer subscript n, it can mean the ring of modular arithmetic modulo n, or its additive cyclic group of order n; or with a prime subscript p, it can mean the ring of p-adic integers. |
Lowercase Latin
| (Note: LaTeX renderings on this table are only available for uppercase Roman letters because Wikipedia's implementation uses the AMSFonts blackboard bold typeface, which does not support other characters, and because LaTeX blackboard bold currently does not work with numerals due a MediaWiki rendering bug.) | U+1D552 | 𝕒 | |
| (Note: LaTeX renderings on this table are only available for uppercase Roman letters because Wikipedia's implementation uses the AMSFonts blackboard bold typeface, which does not support other characters, and because LaTeX blackboard bold currently does not work with numerals due a MediaWiki rendering bug.) | U+1D553 | 𝕓 | |
| (Note: LaTeX renderings on this table are only available for uppercase Roman letters because Wikipedia's implementation uses the AMSFonts blackboard bold typeface, which does not support other characters, and because LaTeX blackboard bold currently does not work with numerals due a MediaWiki rendering bug.) | U+1D554 | 𝕔 | |
| (Note: LaTeX renderings on this table are only available for uppercase Roman letters because Wikipedia's implementation uses the AMSFonts blackboard bold typeface, which does not support other characters, and because LaTeX blackboard bold currently does not work with numerals due a MediaWiki rendering bug.) | U+1D555 | 𝕕 | |
| (Note: LaTeX renderings on this table are only available for uppercase Roman letters because Wikipedia's implementation uses the AMSFonts blackboard bold typeface, which does not support other characters, and because LaTeX blackboard bold currently does not work with numerals due a MediaWiki rendering bug.) | U+1D556 | 𝕖 | |
| (Note: LaTeX renderings on this table are only available for uppercase Roman letters because Wikipedia's implementation uses the AMSFonts blackboard bold typeface, which does not support other characters, and because LaTeX blackboard bold currently does not work with numerals due a MediaWiki rendering bug.) | U+1D557 | 𝕗 | |
| (Note: LaTeX renderings on this table are only available for uppercase Roman letters because Wikipedia's implementation uses the AMSFonts blackboard bold typeface, which does not support other characters, and because LaTeX blackboard bold currently does not work with numerals due a MediaWiki rendering bug.) | U+1D558 | 𝕘 | |
| (Note: LaTeX renderings on this table are only available for uppercase Roman letters because Wikipedia's implementation uses the AMSFonts blackboard bold typeface, which does not support other characters, and because LaTeX blackboard bold currently does not work with numerals due a MediaWiki rendering bug.) | U+1D559 | 𝕙 | |
| (Note: LaTeX renderings on this table are only available for uppercase Roman letters because Wikipedia's implementation uses the AMSFonts blackboard bold typeface, which does not support other characters, and because LaTeX blackboard bold currently does not work with numerals due a MediaWiki rendering bug.) | U+1D55A | 𝕚 | Sometimes used to represent the imaginary unit. |
| (Note: LaTeX renderings on this table are only available for uppercase Roman letters because Wikipedia's implementation uses the AMSFonts blackboard bold typeface, which does not support other characters, and because LaTeX blackboard bold currently does not work with numerals due a MediaWiki rendering bug.) | U+1D55B | 𝕛 | |
| $\mathbb{k}$ | U+1D55C | 𝕜 | Represents a field. |
| | U+1D55D | 𝕝 | |
| | U+1D55E | 𝕞 | |
| | U+1D55F | 𝕟 | |
| | U+1D560 | 𝕠 | |
| | U+1D561 | 𝕡 | |
| | U+1D562 | 𝕢 | |
| | U+1D563 | 𝕣 | |
| | U+1D564 | 𝕤 | |
| | U+1D565 | 𝕥 | |
| | U+1D566 | 𝕦 | |
| | U+1D567 | 𝕧 | |
| | U+1D568 | 𝕨 | |
| | U+1D569 | 𝕩 | |
| | U+1D56A | 𝕪 | |
| | U+1D56B | 𝕫 | |
Italic Latin
| | U+2145 | ⅅ | Sometimes used for the differential. |
| | U+2146 | ⅆ | Sometimes used for the differential. |
| | U+2147 | ⅇ | Sometimes used for the natural exponent. |
| | U+2148 | ⅈ | Sometimes used for the imaginary unit. |
| | U+2149 | ⅉ | Sometimes used for the imaginary unit. |
Greek
| | U+213E | ℾ | |
| | U+213D | ℽ | |
| | U+213F | ℿ | |
| | U+213C | ℼ | |
| | U+2140 | ⅀ | |
Digits
| | U+1D7D8 | 𝟘 | In algebra of logical propositions, it represents a contradiction or falsity. |
| | U+1D7D9 | 𝟙 | In set theory, the top element of a forcing poset, or occasionally the identity matrix in a matrix ring. Also used for the indicator function and the unit step function, and for the identity operator or identity matrix. In geometric algebra, represents the unit antiscalar, the identity element under the geometric antiproduct. In algebra of logical propositions, it represents a tautology. |
| | U+1D7DA | 𝟚 | In category theory, the interval category. |
| | U+1D7DB | 𝟛 | |
| | U+1D7DC | 𝟜 | |
| | U+1D7DD | 𝟝 | |
| | U+1D7DE | 𝟞 | |
| | U+1D7DF | 𝟟 | |
| | U+1D7E0 | 𝟠 | |
| | U+1D7E1 | 𝟡 | |
Arabic
| | U+1EEA1 | 𞺡 | |
| | U+1EEA2 | 𞺢 | |
| | U+1EEA3 | 𞺣 | |
| | U+1EEA5 | 𞺥 | |
| | U+1EEA6 | 𞺦 | |
| | U+1EEA7 | 𞺧 | |
| | U+1EEA8 | 𞺨 | |
| | U+1EEA9 | 𞺩 | |
| | U+1EEAB | 𞺫 | |
| | U+1EEAC | 𞺬 | |
| | U+1EEAD | 𞺭 | |
| | U+1EEAE | 𞺮 | |
| | U+1EEAF | 𞺯 | |
| | U+1EEB0 | 𞺰 | |
| | U+1EEB1 | 𞺱 | |
| | U+1EEB2 | 𞺲 | |
| | U+1EEB3 | 𞺳 | |
| | U+1EEB4 | 𞺴 | |
| | U+1EEB5 | 𞺵 | |
| | U+1EEB6 | 𞺶 | |
| | U+1EEB7 | 𞺷 | |
| | U+1EEB8 | 𞺸 | |
| | U+1EEB9 | 𞺹 | |
| | U+1EEBA | 𞺺 | |
| | U+1EEBB | 𞺻 | |

In addition, a blackboard-bold μ_{n} (not found in Unicode or amsmath LaTeX) is sometimes used by number theorists and algebraic geometers to designate the group scheme of n-th roots of unity.

== See also ==
- Latin letters used in mathematics, science, and engineering
- Mathematical alphanumeric symbols
- Set notation
