= List of letters used in mathematics, science, and engineering =

Latin and Greek letters are used in mathematics, science, engineering, and other areas where mathematical notation is used as symbols for constants, special functions, and also conventionally for variables representing certain quantities.

== Hindu-Arabic numerals ==
Typographical variations of digits in Unicode
Name	Digits
Double-struck	𝟘 𝟙 𝟚 𝟛 𝟜 𝟝 𝟞 𝟟 𝟠 𝟡

== Other scripts ==
=== Hebrew ===
א	Cardinality of infinite sets
ב	Cardinality of infinite sets
ג	Gimel function

=== Cyrillic ===
Л	Lobachevsky function
Ш	Tate–Shafarevich group Dirac comb
ш	Shuffle product

=== Japanese ===
よ	Yoneda embedding
サ	Satake compactification

=== Modified Latin ===
Å	Angstrom
∀	Universal quantification
Đ	Dispersity
∂	Partial derivative
ð	Spin-weighted partial derivative
∃	Existential quantification
$\hbar$	Reduced Planck constant
Ø	Empty set
$\int$	Integral

=== Modified Greek ===
∇	Del operator Gradient; Divergence; Curl
∈	Element (mathematics)
ƛ	Reduced wavelength
∐	Coproduct
