= Casio calculator character sets =

Character sets used by Casio computers

Casio calculator character sets are a group of character sets used by various Casio calculators and pocket computers.

== Code charts ==
=== fx-EX series ===
Casio character set
	0	1	2	3	4	5	6	7	8	9	A	B	C	D	E	F
0x																
1x	𝑥	𝑦	𝑧	⋯	▲	▼	▸	-	$	◁	&	𝑡	_{T}	_{t}	_{h}	₅
2x	SP	!	"	#	×	%	÷	'	(	)	·	+	,	−	.	/
3x	0	1	2	3	4	5	6	7	8	9	:	;	<	=	>	?
4x	@	A	B	C	D	E	F	G	H	I	J	K	L	M	N	O
5x	P	Q	R	S	T	U	V	W	X	Y	Z	[	°	]		_
6x	-	a	b	c	d	e	f	g	h	i	j	k	l	m	n	o
7x	p	q	r	s	t	u	v	w	x	y	z	{	▮	}	~	├
8x	𝒊	𝒆	_{x}	₁₀	∞	ᵒ	ʳ	ᵍ	∠	x̄	ȳ	x̂	ŷ	→	Π	⇒
9x	_{x}	₁₀	₁₀⁻	⸥	≤	≠	≥	⇩	√	∫	_{A}	_{B}	_{C}	ₙ	▶	◀
Ax	⁰	¹	²	³	⁴	⁵	⁶	⁷	⁸	⁹	⁻¹	ˣ	¹⁰	₍	₎	_{±}
Bx	₀	₁	₂	₋₁	_{F}	_{N}	_{P}	_{μ}	𝐀	𝐁	𝐂	𝐃	𝐄	𝐅	𝐏	▷
Cx	Σ	α	γ	ε	θ	λ	μ	π	σ	ϕ	ℓ	ħ	■	□	₃	▬
Dx	𝐟	𝐩	𝐧	𝝁	𝐦	𝐤	𝐌	𝐆	𝐓	𝐏	𝐄	𝐹	ₚ	ₑ	_{J}	_{K}
Ex	_{τ}	ᵤ	₉	Å	ₘ	_{I}	₄	✂️	🗐							
Fx																

=== fx-9860G series ===
Casio character set
	0	1	2	3	4	5	6	7	8	9	A	B	C	D	E	F
0x		𝚏 1D68F		𝚗 1D697				𝙼 1D67C	𝙶 1D676	𝚃 1D683	𝙿 1D67F	𝙴 1D674	◢ 25E2	↵ 21B5		ᴇ 1D07
1x	≤ 2264	≠ 2260	≥ 2265	⇒ 21D2							𝐀 1D400	𝐁 1D401	𝐂 1D402	𝐃 1D403	𝐄 1D404	𝐅 1D405
2x	SP	!	"	#	$	%	&	'	(	)	*	+	,	-	.	/
3x	0	1	2	3	4	5	6	7	8	9	:	;	<	=	>	?
4x	@	A	B	C	D	E	F	G	H	I	J	K	L	M	N	O
5x	P	Q	R	S	T	U	V	W	X	Y	Z	[	\	]		_
6x	`	a	b	c	d	e	f	g	h	i	j	k	l	m	n	o
7x	p	q	r	s	t	u	v	w	x	y	z	{	|	}	~	7F
8x							√ 221A	⁻ 207B					° 00B0			
9x													ᵒ 1D52			
Ax										× 00D7			ʳ 02B3			
Bx						₁₀ 2081				÷ 00F7		⸥ 2E25	ᵍ 1D4D			
Cx			x̄ 78 0304	ȳ 0233								x̂ 78 0302	ŷ 0177	𝚛 1D69B		
Dx									▯ 25AF							
Ex						E5	E6									
Fx										F9						

Lead byte

==== Character set 0x7F ====
Casio character set (prefixed with 0x7F)
	0	1	2	3	4	5	6	7	8	9	A	B	C	D	E	F
0x																
1x																
2x																
3x																
4x																
5x	𝐢 1D422			∞ 221E	∠ 2220											
6x																
7x																
8x																
9x																
Ax																
Bx																
Cx								p̂ 70 0302								
Dx																
Ex																
Fx																

==== Character set 0xE5 ====
Casio character set (prefixed with 0xE5)
	0	1	2	3	4	5	6	7	8	9	A	B	C	D	E	F
0x		À 00C0	Á 00C1	Â 00C2	Ã 00C3	Ä 00C4	Å 00C5	Æ 00C6	Ç 00C7	È 00C8	É 00C9	Ê 00CA	Ë 00CB	Ì 00CC	Í 00CD	Î 00CE
1x	Ï 00CF	Đ 0110	Ñ 00D1	Ò 00D2	Ó 00D3	Ô 00D4	Õ 00D5	Ö 00D6	Ø 00D8	Ù 00D9	Ú 00DA	Û 00DB	Ü 00DC	Ý 00DD	Þ 00DE	
2x	Ÿ 0178	Ă 0102	Ą 0104	Ć 0106	Č 010C	Œ 0152	Ď 010E	Ę 0118	Ě 011A	Ł 0141	Ń 0143	Ň 0147	Ő 0150	Ř 0158	Ś 015A	Š 0160
3x	Ť 0164	Ů 016E	Ű 0170	Ź 0179	Ż 017B	Ž 017D										
4x	Α 0391	Β 0392	Γ 0393	Δ 0394	Ε 0395	Ζ 0396	Η 0397	Θ 0398	Ι 0399	Κ 039A	Λ 039B	Μ 039C	Ν 039D	Ξ 039E	Ο 039F	Π 03A0
5x	Ρ 03A1	Σ 03A3		Τ 03A4	Υ 03A5	Φ 03A6	Χ 03A7	Ψ 03A8	Ω 03A9							
6x	А 0410	Б 0411	В 0412	Г 0413	Д 0414	Е 0415	Ё 0401	Ж 0416	З 0417	И 0418	Й 0419	К 041A	Л 041B	М 041C	Н 041D	О 041E
7x	П 041F	Р 0420	С 0421	Т 0422	У 0423	Ф 0424	Х 0425	Ц 0426	Ч 0427	Ш 0428	Щ 0429	Ъ 042A	Ы 042B	Ь 042C	Э 042D	
8x	Ю 042E	Я 042F	Є 0404													
9x	¡ 00A1	¿ 00BF	€ 20AC	ƒ 0192	… 2026	‘ 2018	’ 2019	“ 201C	” 201D	¢ 00A2	£ 00A3	¤ 00A4	¥ 00A5	§ 00A7	© 00A9	ª 00AA
Ax	¬ 00AC	® 00AE	º 00BA	« 00AB	» 00BB	· 00B7	× 00D7	· 00B7								
Bx	𝐞 1D41E	𝐏 1D40F	𝐫 1D42B	𝐗 1D417	𝐘 1D418	B	R	L	=	<	>	≤	≥	‚ 201A	± 00B1	∓ 2213
Cx	⁰ 2070	¹ 00B9	² 00B2	³ 00B3	⁴ 2074	⁵ 2075	⁶ 2076	⁷ 2077	⁸ 2078	⁹ 2079	⁻¹ 207B B9	⁺ 207A	⁻ 207B	₀	₁	₂
Dx	₀ 2080	₁ 2081	₂ 2082	₃ 2083	₄ 2084	₅ 2085	₆ 2086	₇ 2087	₈ 2088	₉ 2089	₋₁ 208B 2081	₊ 208A	₋ 208B	ˣ	ₙ	^{3}
Ex																
Fx																

==== Character set 0xE6 ====
Casio character set (prefixed with 0xE6)
	0	1	2	3	4	5	6	7	8	9	A	B	C	D	E	F
0x		à 00E0	á 00E1	â 00E2	ã 00E3	ä 00E4	å 00E5	æ 00E6	ç 00E7	è 00E8	é 00E9	ê 00EA	ë 00EB	ì 00EC	í 00ED	î 00EE
1x	ï 00EF	đ 0111	ñ 00F1	ò 00F2	ó 00F3	ô 00F4	õ 00F5	ö 00F6	ø 00F8	ù 00F9	ú 00FA	û 00FB	ü 00FC	ý 00FD	þ 00FE	ß 00DF
2x	ÿ 00FF	ă 0103	ą 0105	ć 0107	č 010D	œ 0153	ď 010F	ę 0119	ě 011B	ł 0142	ń 0144	ň 0148	ő 0151	ř 0159	ś 015B	š 0161
3x	ť 0165	ů 016F	ű 0171	ź 017A	ż 017C	ž 017E										
4x	α 03B1	β 03B2	γ 03B3	δ 03B4	ε 03B5	ζ 03B6	η 03B7	θ 03B8	ι 03B9	κ 03BA	λ 03BB	μ 03BC	ν 03BD	ξ 03BE	ο 03BF	π 03C0
5x	ρ 03C1	σ 03C3	ς 03C2	τ 03C4	υ 03C5	φ 03C6	χ 03C7	ψ 03C8	ω 03C9							
6x	а 0430	б 0431	в 0432	г 0433	д 0434	е 0435	ё 0451	ж 0436	з 0437	и 0438	й 0439	к 043A	л 043B	м 043C	н 043D	о 043E
7x	п 043F	р 0440	с 0441	т 0442	у 0443	ф 0444	х 0445	ц 0446	ч 0447	ш 0448	щ 0449	ъ 044A	ы 044B	ь 044C	э 044D	
8x	ю 044E	я 044F	є 0454													
9x	← 2190	→ 2192	↑ 2191	↓ 2193	⥊ 294A	⥌ 294C	↖ 2196	↗ 2197	↘ 2198	↙ 2199	◀ 25C0	▶ 25B6	▲25B2	▼25BC	► 25BA	▷ 25B7
Ax	⋇ 22C7	【 3010	】 3011	○ 25CB	● 25CF	□ 25A1	■ 25A0	◇ 25C7	◆ 25C6	◘ 25D8	▪ 25AA		△ 25B3	▽ 25BD		◁ 25C1
Bx	≒ 2252	≈ 2248	≡ 2261	≢ 2262	≅ 2245	∽ 223D	∝ 221D	∬ 222C	∮ 222E	∂ 2202		∫ 222B	∡ 2221	∈ 2208	∋ 220B	⊆ 2286
Cx	⊇ 2287	⊂ 2282	⊃ 2283	∪ 222A	∩ 2229	∉ 2209	∌ 220C	⊈ 2288	⊉ 2289	⊄ 2284	⊅ 2285	∅ 2205	∃ 2203	∟ 221F	∨ 2228	∧ 2227
Dx	∀ 2200	⊕ 2295	⊖ 2296	⊗ 2297	⊘ 2298	⊥ 22A5	⇔ 21D4	∥ 2225	∦ 2226	⫽ 2AFD	∇ 2207	∴ 2234	∵ 2235	′ 2032	″ 2033	
Ex																
Fx																

==== Character set 0xF9 ====
Casio character set (prefixed with 0xF9)
	0	1	2	3	4	5	6	7	8	9	A	B	C	D	E	F
0x																
1x																
2x																
3x																
4x																
5x																
6x																
7x																
8x																
9x																
Ax																
Bx																
Cx									^{*1}	^{*2}	^{*3}			^{*4}		
Dx																
Ex																
Fx																

- ^*1 Back control code.
- ^*2 Forward control code.
- ^*3 Down control code.
- ^*4 First from left control code.

=== FX-702P series ===
Casio character set (FX-702P)
	0	1	2	3	4	5	6	7	8	9	A	B	C	D	E	F
0x																
1x		? 003F	° 00B0	' 0027	" 0022	# 0023	$ 0024	; 003B	: 003A	, 002C	> 003E	≥ 2265	= 003D	≤ 2264	< 003C	≠ 2260
2x	+ 002B	- 002D	* 002A	/ 002F	↑ 2191		! 0021		) 0029				( 0028			
3x	0	1	2	3	4	5	6	7	8	9	. 002E	π 03C0				ᴇ 1D07
4x	A	B	C	D	E	F	G	H	I	J	K	L	M	N	O	P
5x	Q	R	S	T	U	V	W	X	Y	Z					_ 005F	
6x																
7x																

=== FX-730P ===
Casio character set (FX-730P)
	0	1	2	3	4	5	6	7	8	9	A	B	C	D	E	F
0x	SP; 0020	+ 002B	- 002D	* 002A	/ 002F	↑ 2191	! 0021	" 0022	# 0023	$ 0024	> 003E	≥ 2265	= 003D	≤ 2264	< 003C	≠ 2260
1x	0 0030	1 0031	2 0032	3 0033	4 0034	5 0035	6 0036	7 0037	8 0038	9 0039	. 002E	π 03C0	) 0029	( 0028	ᴇ⁻ 1D07 207B	ᴇ 1D07
2x	A 0041	B 0042	C 0043	D 0044	E 0045	F 0046	G 0047	H 0048	I 0049	J 004A	K 004B	L 004C	M 004D	N 004E	O 004F	P 0050
3x	Q 0051	R 0052	S 0053	T 0054	U 0055	V 0056	W 0057	X 0058	Y 0059	Z 005A	ᴅ 1D05	ʟ 029F	γ 03B3	⨫ 2A2B	σ 03C3	₋₁ 208B 2081
4x	a 0061	b 0062	c 0063	d 0064	e 0065	f 0066	g 0067	h 0068	i 0069	j 006A	k 006B	l 006C	m 006D	n 006E	o 006F	p 0070
5x	q 0071	r 0072	s 0073	t 0074	u 0075	v 0076	w 0077	x 0078	y 0079	z 007A	“ 201C	” 201D	? 003F	, 002C	; 003B	: 003A
6x	○ 25CB	Σ 03A3	° 00B0	Δ 0394	@ 0040	× 00D7	÷ 00F7	♠ 2660	← 2190	♥ 2665	♦ 2666	♣ 2663	μ 03BC	Ω 03A9	↓ 2193	→ 2192
7x	% 0025	¥ 00A5	□ 25A1	[ 005B	& 0026	_ 005F	' 0027	· 00B7	] 005D	█ 2588	\ 005C	▒ 2592	🙼 1F67C	⮡ 2BA1	τ 03C4	

=== FX-850P, FX-880P, FX-890P, Z-1, Z-1GR ===
Casio character set (FX-850P)
	0	1	2	3	4	5	6	7	8	9	A	B	C	D	E	F
0x					SI; 000F			BEL; 0007	BS; 0008		LF; 000A			CR; 000D	SO; 000E	
1x		DEL; 007F														
2x	SP	!	"	#	$	%	&	'	(	)	*	+	,	-	.	/
3x	0	1	2	3	4	5	6	7	8	9	:	;	<	=	>	?
4x	@	A	B	C	D	E	F	G	H	I	J	K	L	M	N	O
5x	P	Q	R	S	T	U	V	W	X	Y	Z	[	¥	]		_
6x	`	a	b	c	d	e	f	g	h	i	j	k	l	m	n	o
7x	p	q	r	s	t	u	v	w	x	y	z	{	|	}	~	
8x	Å 212B	∫ 222B	√ 221A	´ 00B4	Σ 03A3	Ω 03A9	▒ 2592	▮ 25AE	α 03B1	β 03B2	γ 03B3	ε 03B5	θ 03B8	μ 03BC	σ 03C3	Φ 03A6
9x	⁰ 2070	¹ 00B9	² 00B2	³ 00B3	⁴ 2074	⁵ 2075	⁶ 2076	⁷ 2077	⁸ 2078	⁹ 2079	⁺ 207A	⁻ 207B	ⁿ 207F	ˣ 02E3	⁻¹ 207B 2081	÷ 00F7
Ax	NBSP; 00A0	｡ FF61	｢ FF62	｣ FF63	､ FF64	･ FF65	ｦ FF66	ｧ FF67	ｨ FF68	ｩ FF69	ｪ FF6A	ｫ FF6B	ｬ FF6C	ｭ FF6D	ｮ FF6E	ｯ FF6F
Bx	ｰ FF70	ｱ FF71	ｲ FF72	ｳ FF73	ｴ FF74	ｵ FF75	ｶ FF76	ｷ FF77	ｸ FF78	ｹ FF79	ｺ FF7A	ｻ FF7B	ｼ FF7C	ｽ FF7D	ｾ FF7E	ｿ FF7F
Cx	ﾀ FF80	ﾁ FF81	ﾂ FF82	ﾃ FF83	ﾄ FF84	ﾅ FF85	ﾆ FF86	ﾇ FF87	ﾈ FF88	ﾉ FF89	ﾊ FF8A	ﾋ FF8B	ﾌ FF8C	ﾍ FF8D	ﾎ FF8E	ﾏ FF8F
Dx	ﾐ FF90	ﾑ FF91	ﾒ FF92	ﾓ FF93	ﾔ FF94	ﾕ FF95	ﾖ FF96	ﾗ FF97	ﾘ FF98	ﾙ FF99	ﾚ FF9A	ﾛ FF9B	ﾜ FF9C	ﾝ FF9D	ﾞ FF9E	ﾟ FF9F
Ex	≥ 2265	≤ 2264	≠ 2260	↑ 2191	← 2190	↓ 2193	→ 2192	π 03C0	♠ 2260	♥ 2265	♦ 2666	♣ 2663	□ 25A1	○ 25CB	△ 25B3	\ 005C
Fx	× 00D7	円 5186	年 5E74	月 6708	日 65E5	千 5343	万 4E07	£ 00A3	¢ 00A2	± 00B1	∓ 2213	ᵒ 1D52				

Special or undefined
Common to ASCII and JIS X 0201
Common to JIS X 0201
Common to ASCII but different from JIS X 0201
Specific
Redefinable character

== See also ==
- Calculator character sets
