= Bitstream International Character Set =

Multi-byte character set by Bitstream

The Bitstream International Character Set (BICS) was developed by Bitstream, Inc.

== Code charts ==
=== Character set 0x00 ===
BICS (prefixed with 0x00)
	0	1	2	3	4	5	6	7	8	9	A	B	C	D	E	F
0x																
1x																
2x	SP	!	"	#	$	%	&	'	(	)	*	+	,	-	.	/
3x	0	1	2	3	4	5	6	7	8	9	:	;	<	=	>	?
4x	@	A	B	C	D	E	F	G	H	I	J	K	L	M	N	O
5x	P	Q	R	S	T	U	V	W	X	Y	Z	[	\	]		_
6x	`	a	b	c	d	e	f	g	h	i	j	k	l	m	n	o
7x	p	q	r	s	t	u	v	w	x	y	z	{	|	}	~	
8x		ﬁ	ﬂ	£	¢	ƒ	‰	�	·	‘	“	”	‚	„	†	‡
9x	§	–	—	Å	Æ	Ø	Œ	å	æ	ø	œ	ß	ı	‹	›	«
Ax	»	¿	¡	◌́	◌́	◌̀		◌̀	◌̂	◌̂	◌̈	◌̈	◌̃	◌̃	◌̌	◌̌
Bx	◌̧	◌̄	◌̄	◌̆	◌̆	◌̊	◌̊	Ç	ç	⅛	¼	⅜	½	⅝	¾	⅞
Cx	⅓	⅔	¹	²	³	⁴	⁵	⁶	⁷	⁸	⁹	⁰				
Dx																
Ex		Ð	Ł	Ą	Ę	đ	ł	Ľ		ȷ	ą	ę	ĿL	ŀl	◌̇	◌̇
Fx	◌̋	◌̋	◌̓	◌̱	◌̣	◌̦	�	◌̨	‒	‐						

� Not in Unicode

=== Character set 0x01 ===
BICS (prefixed with 0x01)
	0	1	2	3	4	5	6	7	8	9	A	B	C	D	E	F
0x																
1x																
2x																
3x																
4x	ń	Ń	ñ	Ñ	ň	Ň	ó	Ó	ò	Ò	ô	Ô	ö	Ö	õ	Õ
5x	ú	Ú	ù	Ù	û	Û	ü	Ü	ũ	Ũ	ů	Ů	ÿ	Ÿ	ý	Ý
6x		¼	½	¾							⁾	⁽			¯	ˊ
7x	ľ	Ĩ	ĩ	Ï	ï	Î	î	Ì	ì	Í	í	Ě	ě			Ë
8x	ë	Ê	ê	È	è	É	é	Ã	ã	Ä	ä	Â	â	À	à	Á
9x	á				ŉ						ˈ	‼			₧	
Ax			―			ų	’	…	Þ	þ	ð	¥				
Bx		ĳ	Ĳ	¦	¤						¶				ﬄ	ﬃ
Cx	ﬀ	−	×	÷	±	≡	≠	≈	≥	≤	↓	←	→	↑	↕	↔
Dx	∈	∩					⌠	⌡					√		∞	▀
Ex	▄	▌	▐		■		¬	⌐	⁻	⁺						
Fx					Γ	Δ				Θ						

=== Character set 0x02 ===
BICS (prefixed with 0x02)
	0	1	2	3	4	5	6	7	8	9	A	B	C	D	E	F
0x				Σ			Φ			Ω	α	β			δ	ε
1x		η	θ				μ				π		σ		τ	
2x	ϕ															
3x			♪	♬	©	®	™	■	□		′	″	°	↨		•
4x	⚫︎	●		◘		►	◄	▼	▲	♂	♀	♥	♣	♦	♠	�
5x	�	░	▒	▓			☼	☺	☻					ť	Ť	ŷ
6x	Ŷ	ź	Ź	ž	Ž	ż	Ż					ă	Ă	ć	Ć	č
7x	Č	ď			d̄	D̄	ē	Ē			ģ			Ģ	ī	Ī
8x	i	İ	į	Į	ķ	Ķ	ĺ	Ĺ	l̄	L̄	ļ	Ļ		N̄	ņ	Ņ
9x	ő	Ő			ř	Ř	ŗ	Ŗ	ś	Ś	š	Š		S̄	ș	Ș
Ax			t̄	T̄	ț	Ț	ū	Ū	ű	Ű	ŵ	Ŵ	y̆	Y̆		
Bx						∮		∝								
Cx																
Dx																
Ex																
Fx																

=== Character set 0x03 ===
BICS (prefixed with 0x03)
	0	1	2	3	4	5	6	7	8	9	A	B	C	D	E	F
0x																
1x														┐		
2x																
3x																
4x																
5x																
6x																
7x																
8x																
9x																
Ax																
Bx																
Cx																
Dx																
Ex																
Fx																

=== Character set 0x04 ===
BICS (prefixed with 0x04)
	0	1	2	3	4	5	6	7	8	9	A	B	C	D	E	F
0x																
1x																
2x																
3x																
4x																
5x																
6x																
7x																
8x																
9x																
Ax																
Bx																
Cx								◌̸								
Dx																
Ex																
Fx																

=== Character set 0x05 ===
BICS (prefixed with 0x05)
	0	1	2	3	4	5	6	7	8	9	A	B	C	D	E	F
0x																
1x																
2x																
3x																
4x																
5x					◌́	◌́			◌̀	◌̀			◌̂	◌̂		
6x	◌̈	◌̈			◌̃	◌̃			◌̌	◌̌			◌̧			
7x	◌̄	◌̄			◌̆	◌̆			◌̊	◌̊				Ŀ		
8x				ŀ												
9x																
Ax																
Bx																
Cx																◌̇
Dx	◌̇			◌̋	◌̋			◌̓	◌̓	◌̓			◌̱			
Ex		◌̣					◌̦					�				
Fx	◌̨															

=== Character set 0x07 ===
BICS (prefixed with 0x07)
	0	1	2	3	4	5	6	7	8	9	A	B	C	D	E	F
0x																
1x																
2x																
3x																
4x																
5x																
6x																
7x																
8x																
9x																
Ax																
Bx																
Cx													◌̅			
Dx																
Ex							₁						₂			
Fx			₃						₄						₅	

=== Character set 0x08 ===
BICS (prefixed with 0x08)
	0	1	2	3	4	5	6	7	8	9	A	B	C	D	E	F
0x					₆						₇					
1x	₈						₉						₀			
2x																
3x																
4x																
5x																
6x																
7x																
8x																
9x																
Ax																
Bx																
Cx																
Dx																
Ex																
Fx																

=== Character set 0x0A ===
BICS (prefixed with 0x0A)
	0	1	2	3	4	5	6	7	8	9	A	B	C	D	E	F
0x																
1x																
2x																
3x																
4x																
5x								ā						Ā		
6x																
7x																
8x																
9x																
Ax																
Bx																
Cx																
Dx									D̕							
Ex																
Fx																

=== Character set 0x0B ===
BICS (prefixed with 0x0B)
	0	1	2	3	4	5	6	7	8	9	A	B	C	D	E	F
0x																
1x																
2x																
3x																
4x																
5x																
6x																
7x																
8x																
9x																
Ax									ǧ						Ǧ	
Bx																
Cx																
Dx																
Ex																
Fx																

=== Character set 0x0D ===
BICS (prefixed with 0x0D)
	0	1	2	3	4	5	6	7	8	9	A	B	C	D	E	F
0x																
1x																
2x																
3x																
4x					n̄											
5x																
6x																
7x																
8x																
9x																
Ax																
Bx																
Cx																
Dx																
Ex																
Fx													r̀			

=== Character set 0x0E ===
BICS (prefixed with 0x0E)
	0	1	2	3	4	5	6	7	8	9	A	B	C	D	E	F
0x			R̀													
1x																
2x																
3x																
4x																
5x																
6x																
7x									s̄							
8x																
9x											ş					
Ax	Ş															
Bx																
Cx																
Dx																
Ex																
Fx																

=== Character set 0x11 ===
BICS (prefixed with 0x11)
	0	1	2	3	4	5	6	7	8	9	A	B	C	D	E	F
0x																
1x																
2x																
3x																
4x																
5x																
6x																
7x									◌̳							
8x									̓	̓	̓					
9x																
Ax													₣			
Bx																
Cx																
Dx																
Ex																
Fx																

=== Character set 0x12 ===
BICS (prefixed with 0x12)
	0	1	2	3	4	5	6	7	8	9	A	B	C	D	E	F
0x																
1x																
2x																
3x																
4x																
5x																
6x																
7x																
8x	∓								~							
9x																
Ax																
Bx																
Cx																
Dx																
Ex																
Fx																

=== Character set 0x13 ===
BICS (prefixed with 0x13)
	0	1	2	3	4	5	6	7	8	9	A	B	C	D	E	F
0x																
1x																
2x								🭼								
3x																
4x																
5x																
6x																
7x																
8x																
9x																
Ax																
Bx			⬤													
Cx																
Dx														🭲		
Ex																
Fx																

=== Character set 0x14 ===
BICS (prefixed with 0x14)
	0	1	2	3	4	5	6	7	8	9	A	B	C	D	E	F
0x																
1x												ℓ				
2x																
3x																
4x													⬛︎			
5x																
6x																
7x												⚬	⚫︎			
8x		⌙													ℇ	
9x																
Ax																
Bx																
Cx																
Dx																
Ex																
Fx												©	®			

=== Character set 0x15 ===
BICS (prefixed with 0x15)
	0	1	2	3	4	5	6	7	8	9	A	B	C	D	E	F
0x																
1x												○				
2x	◙		◼								⌂			─	┌	[]
3x	└			┼	┬	┴	├	┤	│		═	╗	╔	╝	╚	
4x		╬	╦	╩	╠	╣	║									
5x						╞	╡	╨	╥	╪	╫	╟	╢			
6x																
7x																
8x							ᵃ				ᵉ				ⁱ	
9x		ˡ	ᵐ	ⁿ	ᵒ			ʳ	ˢ	ᵗ						
Ax	╧	╤	╖	╕	╜	╛	╙	╘	╓	╒			⧹			
Bx			⌑													
Cx																
Dx																
Ex																
Fx																

=== Character set 0x19 ===
BICS (prefixed with 0x19)
	0	1	2	3	4	5	6	7	8	9	A	B	C	D	E	F
0x																
1x																
2x																
3x											😝︎					
4x																
5x																
6x																
7x																
8x																
9x																
Ax																
Bx																
Cx																
Dx																
Ex																
Fx																
