= Code page 899 =

Mathematical character set for DOS

IBM code page 899 (CCSID 899) is a computing code page used under DOS to type mathematical symbols. It is also used by some printers. It contains the same characters as code page 259, but in a different arrangement.

== Code page layout ==
Characters are shown with their equivalent Unicode codes.

Code Page 899
| | 0 | 1 | 2 | 3 | 4 | 5 | 6 | 7 | 8 | 9 | A | B | C | D | E | F |
|---|---|---|---|---|---|---|---|---|---|---|---|---|---|---|---|---|
| 0x | | | | | | | | | | | | | | | | |
| 1x | | | | | | ₅ | | | | | | | | | | |
| 2x | SP | √ | ® | ± | ∙ | ♂ | ≤ | ´ | ( | ) | ≠ | © | ♀ | - | † | ≥ |
| 3x | ⁰ | ¹ | ² | ³ | ⁴ | ⁵ | ⁶ | ⁷ | ⁸ | ⁹ | ÷ | ¨ | < | ″ | > | ∫ |
| 4x | ° | ∇ | ∞ | Ψ | Φ | ← | Π | Λ | ¶ | ↑ | ‗ | § | Ω | ∂ | ∿ | ↓ |
| 5x | ℓ | Γ | Θ | Σ | → | Ξ | ∝ | Δ | ≡ | Υ | ≃ | [ | \ | ] | | _ |
| 6x | ` | α | β | ψ | φ | ε | π | λ | η | ι | ϑ | κ | ω | μ | ν | ο |
| 7x | ρ | γ | θ | σ | τ | ξ | × | δ | χ | υ | ζ | { | ′ | } | ~ | SP |
| 8x | ∓ | ⍁ | ¯ | ⁼ | ⁻ | ⁺ | ^{Δ} | ⃗ | ^{<} | ^{>} | ℞ | ↗ | ∴ | ↘ | ∧ | ⟩ |
| 9x | ∪ | ┴ | ⎞ | ◆ | ˇ | (Note: This character is named "bottle symbol".) | ■ | ‾ | ⎳ | ► | ⅜ | ₀ | ₁ | ₂ | ₃ | ₄ |
| Ax | ᪲ | ⋶ | | | ⎲ | ^{/} | ⌑ | ┬ | ┼ | ┤ | | ⊥ | ₈ | ₇ | ┐ | ┌ | ├ |
| Bx | ^{π} | ‡ | ∨ | ∥ | ∠ | ⟨ | ∩ | ⊂ | ⊃ | ⊕ | ∟ | | ⊗ | ˘ | ̿ | └ |
| Cx | │ | ⎛ | ⎝ | ‰ | ™ | ⎠ | ≅ | ┘ | ― | ⎰ | ⎱ | ₆ | ₉ | ⍚ | ● | £ |
| Dx | ¤ | ¥ | SHY | ␢ | □ | ∼ | ¬ | ▲ | ⌠ | ⌡ | 0︀ (Note: Zero with a slash) | ⅛ | ⅝ | ⅞ | RSP | NSP |
| Ex | ₅ | | | | | | | | | | | | | | | |
| Fx | | | | | | | | | | | | | | | | |

=== Code page 1092 ===
Code page 1092 (CCSID 1092) is very similar to code page 899. The only difference is that code 0xC8 is mapped to ─ U+2500 BOX DRAWINGS LIGHT HORIZONTAL instead of ― U+2015 HORIZONTAL BAR.
