= 1,000,000,000,000 =

1000000000000
- List of numbers; Integers; ← 10^{0} 10^{1} 10^{2} 10^{3} 10^{4} 10^{5} 10^{6} 10^{7} 10^{8} 10^{9} 10^{10} 10^{11} 10^{12} 10^{13}
- Cardinal: One trillion (short scale); One billion (long scale); One thousand billion One million million
- Ordinal: One trillionth (short scale); One billionth (long scale)
- Factorization: 2^{12}; 5^{12}
- Divisors: 169 total
- Greek numeral: $\stackrel{\alpha}{\Mu}$
- Roman numeral: M̅̅̅ (M with three overlines)
- Greek prefix: tera-
- Binary: 1110100011010100101001010001000000000000_{2}
- Ternary: 10112121011201102102111001_{3}
- Senary: 2043221010301344_{6}
- Octal: 16432451210000_{8}
- Duodecimal: 141981B87854_{12}
- Hexadecimal: E8D4A51000_{16}
- Base 36: CRE66I9S_{36}
- Arabic: ١٠٠٠٠٠٠٠٠٠٠٠٠
- Bengali: ১০০০০০০০০০০০০
- Chinese: 万亿 (standard), 兆 (myriad scale)
- Devanagari: १००००००००००००
- Japanese: 兆
- Khmer: ១០០០០០០០០០០០០ (ពាន់ពាន់លាន)
- Korean: 조
- Tamil: ௲௲௲௲, க௦௦௦௦௦௦௦௦௦௦௦௦
- Thai: ๑๐๐๐๐๐๐๐๐๐๐๐๐ (หนึ่งล้านล้าน)

1,000,000,000,000 (one trillion on the short scale; one billion on the long scale; one thousand billion; one million million) is the natural number following 999,999,999,999 and preceding 1,000,000,000,001. It is known as 10 kharab, 1000 arab, or 1 lakh crore in the Indian numbering system.

== Etymology ==
The word trillion was created in the 1680s, borrowed from French trillion and Italian trilione, which is from tri- ("three") + million ("a thousand thousands"). Originally in British English, the word "trillion" referred to million million millions (while "billion" referred to million millions, which is equal to trillion in American English); however, to many people, the word refers to one thousand billion (1,000,000,000,000) in the present day.

Trillion is often abbreviated as T, t, or tn. Rarer forms include tril, trill, tln, and trn.

== Properties ==
1,000,000,000,000 is written in scientific notation as 1 × 10^{12} or 10^{12} (1E+12 or simply 1E12 in E notation). It is a perfect power, harshad number, square number (1,000,000^{2}), cube number (10,000^{3}), tesseractic number (1,000^{4}), and a 6-hypercube number (100^{6}). It is also even, composite, abundant, polite, practical, frugal, and regular.

1,000,000,000,000 has a total of 169 divisors (156 even, 13 odd), whose geometric mean is 1,000,000. The sum of all its divisors (including itself) is 2,499,694,822,171; therefore, its aliquot sum is 1,499,694,822,171, and its abundance is 499,694,822,171. All divisors are displayed below:

1, 2, 4, 5, 8, 10, 16, 20, 25, 32, 40, 50, 64, 80, 100, 125, 128, 160, 200, 250, 256, 320, 400, 500, 512, 625, 640, 800, 1000, 1024, 1250, 1280, 1600, 2000, 2048, 2500, 2560, 3125, 3200, 4000, 4096, 5000, 5120, 6250, 6400, 8000, 10000, 10240, 12500, 12800, 15625, 16000, 20000, 20480, 25000, 25600, 31250, 32000, 40000, 50000, 51200, 62500, 64000, 78125, 80000, 100000, 102400, 125000, 128000, 156250, 160000, 200000, 250000, 256000, 312500, 320000, 390625, 400000, 500000, 512000, 625000, 640000, 781250, 800000, 1000000, 1250000, 1280000, 1562500, 1600000, 1953125, 2000000, 2500000, 2560000, 3125000, 3200000, 3906250, 4000000, 5000000, 6250000, 6400000, 7812500, 8000000, 9765625, 10000000, 12500000, 12800000, 15625000, 16000000, 19531250, 20000000, 25000000, 31250000, 32000000, 39062500, 40000000, 48828125, 50000000, 62500000, 64000000, 78125000, 80000000, 97656250, 100000000, 125000000, 156250000, 160000000, 195312500, 200000000, 244140625, 250000000, 312500000, 320000000, 390625000, 400000000, 488281250, 500000000, 625000000, 781250000, 800000000, 976562500, 1000000000, 1250000000, 1562500000, 1600000000, 1953125000, 2000000000, 2500000000, 3125000000, 3906250000, 4000000000, 5000000000, 6250000000, 7812500000, 8000000000, 10000000000, 12500000000, 15625000000, 20000000000, 25000000000, 31250000000, 40000000000, 50000000000, 62500000000, 100000000000, 125000000000, 200000000000, 250000000000, 500000000000, 1000000000000

1,000,000,000,000 has an Euler totient of 400,000,000,000, and a cototient of 600,000,000,000. There are 37,607,912,018 positive primes less than it.

Below is the list of basic calculations of 1,000,000,000,000:

| | Multiplication $\scriptstyle{\text{1,000,000,000,000 }\times\text{ x}}$ | Division $\scriptstyle{\text{1,000,000,000,000 }\div\text{ x}}$ | Exponentiation $\scriptstyle{\text{1,000,000,000,000}^\text{x}}$ | nth root $\scriptstyle{\sqrt[\text{x}]{\text{1,000,000,000,000}}}$ |
|---|---|---|---|---|
| 2 | 2,000,000,000,000 | 500,000,000,000 | 10^{24} | 1,000,000 |
| 3 | 3,000,000,000,000 | 333,333,333,333.3̅ | 10^{36} | 10,000 |
| 4 | 4,000,000,000,000 | 250,000,000,000 | 10^{48} | 1,000 |
| 5 | 5,000,000,000,000 | 200,000,000,000 | 10^{60} | ≈251.188643151 |
| 6 | 6,000,000,000,000 | 166,666,666,666.6̅ | 10^{72} | 100 |
| 7 | 7,000,000,000,000 | 142,857,142,857.1̅4̅2̅8̅5̅7̅ | 10^{84} | ≈51.7947467923 |
| 8 | 8,000,000,000,000 | 125,000,000,000 | 10^{96} | ≈31.6227766017 |
| 9 | 9,000,000,000,000 | 111,111,111,111.1̅ | 10^{108} | ≈21.5443469003 |
| 10 | 10,000,000,000,000 | 100,000,000,000 | 10^{120} | ≈15.8489319246 |

== Scientific usage ==
For physical quantities, the metric prefix tera- (symbol T) indicates 1,000,000,000,000 times the base unit. For example, 10^{12} bits of data is called a terabit, 10^{12} joules of energy is called a terajoule, and 10^{12} watts of power is called a terawatt.

The computing performance of 10^{12} floating point operations per second (teraFLOPS) is known as terascale computing. It is the performance of several supercomputers, such as NEC SX-4, Intel's ASCI Red, and iPhone 15 Pro September 2023 A17 Pro processor.

== Sense of scale ==
Visualization of powers of ten from one to 10^{12}

Some comparisons below give a sense of how large 1,000,000,000,000 (10^{12}) is, according to current evidence.

=== Time ===
- 10^{12} seconds (a terasecond, about 31,688 years) ago, homo sapiens were living as hunter-gatherers.
- 10^{12} minutes (about 1.9 million years) ago, Homo erectus arose in Africa, and early expansions of hominins out of Africa started as archaic humans moved throughout Eurasia.
- 10^{12} hours (about 114 million years) ago, Late Cretaceous dinosaurs dominated the land, and giant squids thrived in the oceans.
- 10^{12} days (about 2.74 × 10^{9} years) ago, Earth was a world where only single-celled microorganisms existed. 10^{12} days from now, Earth's overall surface temperature will reach 420 K (296 °F; 147 °C). All life on Earth will be extinct, except single-celled microorganisms.
- 10^{12} months (about 83 × 10^{9} years) ago, the universe did not exist. 10^{12} months from now, the Moon may collide with the Earth or be torn apart to form an orbital ring, if both have not already been destroyed.
- 10^{12} years—a teraannus—is 70 times the age of the universe. 10^{12} years from now, star formation may end in galaxies as they lack gas clouds to form new stars, and evidence of Big Bang may become undetectable.

=== Distance ===
- 10^{12} inches is about 15 million miles (24 million km), approximately 1/6th the distance from the Earth to the Sun.
- 10^{12} metres (a terametre) is over six times the distance from the Earth to the Sun. It is the estimated diameter of Betelgeuse, a red supergiant star.
- 10^{12} kilometres (a petametre) is about 1/10th a light-year.

=== Area ===
- 10^{12} square inches is approximately the total area of Saint Lucia, an island country in the eastern Caribbean.
- 10^{12} square feet is larger than the total area of Portugal.
- 10^{12} square metres is approximately the total area of Ethiopia, the 26th largest country on Earth.
- 10^{12} square kilometres is almost 2,000 times the Earth's total surface area.

=== Volume ===
- If 10^{12} cubic metres of water were spread evenly over the Moon's surface, it would create a layer of water approximately 2.6 centimetres (1.0 in) deep.
- 10^{12} grains of sand would occupy a volume of about 2 cubic metres (71 ft^{3}).

=== Economy ===
- Spain's GDP in 2024 was approximately US$1.73 × 10^{12}.
- Elon Musk's estimated net worth reached US$1 × 10^{12} in 2026.
- SpaceX's market capitalization reached US$2 × 10^{12} in 2026.
- Nvidia's market capitalization reached US$5.5 × 10^{12} in 2026.

=== Nature ===
- The surface of the human body houses around 10^{12} bacteria.
- An average-sized mountain weighs about 10^{12} kilograms.
- Andromeda Galaxy, Milky Way's neighbor, contains about 10^{12} stars.
- There are around 2 × 10^{12} galaxies in the observable universe.
- There were around 3 × 10^{12} trees on Earth in 2015.
- There are around 3.5 × 10^{12} fish in the ocean.

== Selected 13-digit numbers (1,000,000,000,001–9,999,999,999,999) ==
=== 1,000,000,000,001 to 1,999,999,999,999 ===
- 1,000,000,000,039 : smallest 13-digit prime number
- 1,000,001,326,005 : 1,414,214th triangular number
- 1,000,002,000,001 = 1,000,001^{2}, palindromic square
- 1,004,006,004,001 = 1,002,001^{2} = 1,001^{4}, palindromic fourth power
- 1,061,520,150,601 = 1,030,301^{2} = 10,201^{3} = 101^{6}
- 1,062,991,989,013 : number of square (0,1)-matrices without zero rows and with exactly 11 entries equal to 1
- 1,070,710,724,173 : 153rd Markov number
- 1,099,511,627,776 = 256^{5} = 16^{10} = 4^{20} = 2^{40}, binary approximation of metric prefix tera-
- 1,099,511,629,376 : Leyland number using 2 & 40 (2^{40} + 40^{2})
- 1,099,511,787,776 : Leyland number using 4 & 20 (4^{20} + 20^{4})
- 1,111,111,111,111 : repunit
- 1,117,594,214,815 : 62nd perfect totient number
- 1,124,388,064,800 : 67th superabundant number
- 1,125,000,750,000 : sum of first 1,500,000 natural numbers
- 1,141,246,682,444 = 2^{2}×11^{11}
- 1,177,269,848,575 : 63rd perfect totient number
- 1,184,065,449,986 : 154th Markov number
- 1,202,590,842,879 : 35th Woodall number
- 1,226,280,710,981 : 15th alternating factorial
- 1,277,956,497,400 : initial number of seventh-century xx00 to xx99 containing exactly seventeen prime numbers (1,277,956,497,400+n, for n = 1, 7, 9, 13, 27, 31, 37, 39, 49, 51, 57, 63, 73, 79, 81, 87, 97)
- 1,289,904,147,324 : 24th Catalan number
- 1,307,674,368,000 = 15!
- 1,307,674,368,120 : 15th factoriangular number
- 1,338,193,159,771 : number of posets with 14 unlabeled elements
- 1,373,119,300,369 : number of series-reduced planted trees with 45 nodes
- 1,419,855,914,607 : 38th Wedderburn-Etherington number
- 1,427,933,269,321 : 155th Markov number
- 1,466,024,067,850 : number of 48-bead necklaces (turning over is allowed) where complements are equivalent
- 1,489,877,926,680 : 5th 8-dimensional Catalan number
- 1,490,542,435,045 : 156th Markov number
- 1,497,207,322,930 : number of 47-bead binary necklaces with beads of 2 colors where the colors may be swapped but turning over is not allowed
- 1,499,694,822,171 : aliquot sum of 1,000,000,000,000
- 1,513,744,654,945 : 33rd Pell number, 157th Markov number
- 1,523,548,331,041 = 1,234,321^{2} = 1,111^{4}
- 1,548,008,755,920 : 60th Fibonacci number
- 1,563,135,350,013 : number of (unordered, unlabeled) rooted trimmed trees with 36 nodes
- 1,618,362,158,587 : 19th Schröder–Hipparchus number
- 1,697,385,471,211 : 30th Motzkin number
- 1,706,111,387,068 : number of centered hydrocarbons with 37 carbon atoms
- 1,722,099,665,665 : 158th Markov number
- 1,915,868,454,737 : 159th Markov number
- 1,927,522,396,800 : 68th superabundant number
- 1,934,197,506,555 : 48th repfigit
- 1,961,990,553,600 = 24!!

=== 2,000,000,000,000 to 2,999,999,999,999 ===
- 2,000,001,000,000 : sum of first 2,000,000 natural numbers
- 2,076,871,684,802 : 160th Markov number
- 2,122,553,644,686 : number of secondary structures of RNA molecules with 35 nucleotides
- 2,135,248,790,338 : 161st Markov number
- 2,156,735,837,173 : 162nd Markov number
- 2,222,222,222,222 : repdigit
- 2,236,994,992,300 : initial number of eighth century xx00 to xx99 containing exactly seventeen prime numbers (2,236,994,992,300+n, for n = 1, 3, 7, 13, 19, 21, 27, 39, 57, 61, 63, 67, 69, 73, 81, 91, 99)
- 2,248,776,129,600 : 69th superabundant number, 100th highly composite number, 18th superior highly composite number
- 2,262,366,343,746 : number of trees with 35 unlabeled nodes
- 2,328,903,057,600 : amount of milliseconds in the average human lifetime of 73.8 calendar years.
- 2,329,089,562,800 : highly composite number; least common multiple of every number from 1 to 30.
- 2,473,901,162,495 : 36th Woodall number
- 2,499,694,822,171 : sum of all divisors of 1,000,000,000,000
- 2,504,730,781,961 : 61st Fibonacci number, 163rd Markov number
- 2,541,865,828,329 = 9^{13} = 3^{26}, 64th perfect totient number
- 2,541,865,845,905 : Leyland number using 3 & 26 (3^{26} + 26^{3})
- 2,552,470,327,702 : Leyland number using 9 & 13 (9^{13} + 13^{9})
- 2,557,227,044,764 : number of free polyominoes with 25 cells
- 2,821,109,907,456 = 1,679,616^{2} = 1,296^{4} = 36^{8} = 6^{16}
- 2,821,126,684,672 : Leyland number using 6 & 16 (6^{16} + 16^{6})
- 2,872,202,028,517 : number of 49-bead necklaces (turning over is allowed) where complements are equivalent
- 2,906,166,827,065 : number of series-reduced planted trees with 46 nodes
- 2,932,031,358,484 : number of 48-bead binary necklaces with beads of 2 colors where the colors may be swapped but turning over is not allowed
- 2,959,365,073,955 ≈ 10^(3*π+3), rounded-up pi-illion

=== 3,000,000,000,000 to 3,999,999,999,999 ===
- 3,099,893,879,221 : 164th Markov number
- 3,125,001,250,000 : sum of first 2,500,000 natural numbers
- 3,204,941,750,802 : number of positive primes less than 10^{14}
- 3,212,537,328,000 : 101st highly composite number
- 3,236,724,317,174 : 19th Schröder number
- 3,257,843,882,624 : 23rd telephone number
- 3,267,653,834,825 : 165th Markov number
- 3,333,333,333,333 : repdigit
- 3,373,164,194,400 : 70th superabundant number, 102nd highly composite number
- 3,389,524,479,050 : 39th Wedderburn-Etherington number
- 3,494,391,117,164 : number of signed trees with 22 nodes
- 3,512,479,453,921 = 1,874,161^{2} = 1,369^{4} = 37^{8}
- 3,654,502,875,938 : 34th Pell number
- 3,809,950,977,008 : 16th logarithmic number
- 3,814,697,265,625 = 1,953,125^{2} = 25^{9} = 5^{18}
- 3,814,699,155,193 : Leyland number using 5 & 18 (5^{18} + 18^{5})
- 3,899,735,407,806 : number of (unordered, unlabeled) rooted trimmed trees with 37 nodes

=== 4,000,000,000,000 to 4,999,999,999,999 ===
- 4,052,739,537,881 : 62nd Fibonacci number
- 4,360,711,162,037 : 166th Markov number
- 4,444,444,444,444 : repdigit
- 4,492,268,106,137 : number of centered hydrocarbons with 38 carbon atoms
- 4,497,552,259,200 : 71st superabundant number, 103rd highly composite number
- 4,500,001,500,000 : sum of first 3,000,000 natural numbers
- 4,508,515,437,145 : 167th Markov number
- 4,643,961,467,965 : 168th Markov number
- 4,658,179,125,600 : 72nd superabundant number
- 4,747,561,509,943 = 16,807^{3} = 343^{5} = 7^{15}
- 4,747,732,369,318 : Leyland number using 7 & 15 (7^{15} + 15^{7})
- 4,859,761,676,391 : 31st Motzkin number
- 4,861,946,401,452 : 25th Catalan number

=== 5,000,000,000,000 to 5,999,999,999,999 ===
- 5,085,241,278,463 : 37th Woodall number
- 5,336,735,929,371 : number of secondary structures of RNA molecules with 36 nucleotides
- 5,528,778,008,357 : 169th Markov number
- 5,555,555,555,555 : repdigit
- 5,587,637,513,705 : 170th Markov number
- 5,629,516,646,996 : number of 50-bead necklaces (turning over is allowed) where complements are equivalent
- 5,744,387,279,818 : number of 49-bead binary necklaces with beads of 2 colors where the colors may be swapped but turning over is not allowed
- 5,832,742,205,057 : 19th Bell number
- 5,878,625,373,184 : rounded-up length of a light-year in miles

=== 6,000,000,000,000 to 6,999,999,999,999 ===
- 6,073,061,476,032 : self-descriptive number in base 12
- 6,125,001,750,000 : sum of first 3,500,000 natural numbers
- 6,155,434,522,614 : number of series-reduced planted trees with 47 nodes
- 6,226,306,037,178 : number of trees with 36 unlabeled nodes
- 6,557,470,319,842 : 63rd Fibonacci number, 171st Markov number
- 6,666,666,666,666 : repdigit
- 6,746,328,388,800 : 73rd superabundant number, 104th highly composite number
- 6,963,472,309,248 : 4th taxicab number

=== 7,000,000,000,000 to 7,999,999,999,999 ===
- 7,163,627,708,162 : 172nd Markov number
- 7,420,738,134,810 : 12th primorial
- 7,625,597,484,987 = 19,683^{3} = 27^{9} = 3^{27} = 3^{3^{3}} = ^{3}3 = _{2}3, megafugathree
- 7,625,597,504,670 : Leyland number using 3 & 27 (3^{27} + 27^{3})
- 7,777,777,777,777 : repdigit
- 7,905,853,580,625 = 25!!

=== 8,000,000,000,000 to 8,999,999,999,999 ===
- 8,000,002,000,000 : sum of first 4,000,000 natural numbers
- 8,099,766,813,570 : 40th Wedderburn-Etherington number
- 8,115,549,747,397 : 173rd Markov number
- 8,649,755,859,375 = 15^{11}
- 8,756,963,649,152 : 49th repfigit
- 8,759,309,660,445 : 20th Schröder–Hipparchus number
- 8,822,750,406,821 : 35th Pell number, 174th Markov number
- 8,888,888,888,888 : repdigit
- 8,916,100,448,256 = 2985984^{2} = 20736^{3} = 144^{6} = 12^{12}
- 8,995,104,518,400 : 105th highly composite number

=== 9,000,000,000,000 to 9,999,999,999,999 ===
- 9,210,000,001,000 : 10th autobiographical number
- 9,316,358,251,200 : 74th superabundant number, 106th highly composite number
- 9,460,730,472,581 : rounded-up length of a light-year in kilometres
- 9,739,810,110,758 : number of (unordered, unlabeled) rooted trimmed trees with 38 nodes
- 9,787,184,545,081 : 175th Markov number
- 9,918,212,890,625 : 24th 1-automorphic number
- 9,925,594,216,162 : 176th Markov number
- 9,999,088,822,075 : number of free polyominoes with 26 cells
- 9,999,999,999,971 : largest 13-digit prime number
- 9,999,999,999,999 : largest 13-digit number, repdigit

== See also ==
- Long and short scales
- Names of large numbers
- Orders of magnitude (numbers)
- Power of 10
