= Superscripts and Subscripts =

- Range: U+2070..U+209F (48 code points)
- Plane: BMP
- Scripts: Latin (18 char.); Common (28 char.)
- Assigned: 46 code points
- Unused: 2 reserved code points

Unicode Version History
- 1.0.0 (1991): 28 (+28)
- 3.2 (2002): 29 (+1)
- 4.1 (2005): 34 (+5)
- 6.0 (2010): 42 (+8)
- 18.0 (2026): 46 (+4)

Unicode documentation
- Code chart ∣ Web page

Superscripts and Subscripts is a Unicode block containing superscript and subscript numerals, mathematical operators, and letters used in mathematics and phonetics. The use of subscripts and superscripts in Unicode allows any polynomial, chemical and certain other equations to be represented in plain text without using any form of markup like HTML or TeX. Other superscript letters can be found in the Spacing Modifier Letters, Phonetic Extensions and Phonetic Extensions Supplement blocks, while the superscript 1, 2, and 3, inherited from ISO 8859-1, were included in the Latin-1 Supplement block.

== Block ==
Superscripts and Subscripts^{[1]}^{[2]}^{[3]} Official Unicode Consortium code chart (PDF)
| | 0 | 1 | 2 | 3 | 4 | 5 | 6 | 7 | 8 | 9 | A | B | C | D | E | F |
| U+207x | ⁰ | ⁱ | | | ⁴ | ⁵ | ⁶ | ⁷ | ⁸ | ⁹ | ⁺ | ⁻ | ⁼ | ⁽ | ⁾ | ⁿ |
| U+208x | ₀ | ₁ | ₂ | ₃ | ₄ | ₅ | ₆ | ₇ | ₈ | ₉ | ₊ | ₋ | ₌ | ₍ | ₎ | ₏ |
| U+209x | ₐ | ₑ | ₒ | ₓ | ₔ | ₕ | ₖ | ₗ | ₘ | ₙ | ₚ | ₛ | ₜ | ₝ | ₞ | ₟ |
Notes 1.As of Unicode version 18.0 2.Grey areas indicate non-assigned code points 3.Refer to the Latin-1 Supplement Unicode block for characters ¹ (U+00B9), ² (U+00B2) and ³ (U+00B3)

== History ==
The following Unicode-related documents record the purpose and process of defining specific characters in the Superscripts and Subscripts block:

| Version | Final code points (Note: Proposed code points and characters names may differ from final code points and names) | Count | L2 ID | WG2 ID | Document |
|---|---|---|---|---|---|
| 1.0.0 | U+2070, 2074..208E | 28 | | | (to be determined) |
| 1.0.0 | U+2070, 2074..208E | 28 | L2/09-003R | | Moore, Lisa (2009-02-12), "General Category Change (B.14.5)", UTC #118 / L2 #215 Minutes |
| 3.2 | U+2071 | 1 | L2/00-159 | | da Cruz, Frank (2000-03-31), Supplemental Terminal Graphics for Unicode |
| 3.2 | U+2071 | 1 | L2/00-115R2 | | Moore, Lisa (2000-08-08), "Motion 83-M24", Minutes Of UTC Meeting #83 |
| 3.2 | U+2071 | 1 | L2/00-329 | N2265 | Whistler, Ken (2000-09-19), Proposal for Terminal Graphic Symbols in the BMP |
| 3.2 | U+2071 | 1 | L2/01-050 | N2253 | Umamaheswaran, V. S. (2001-01-21), "Resolution M39.20 (Terminal Graphic Symbols)", Minutes of the SC2/WG2 meeting in Athens, September 2000 |
| 3.2 | U+2071 | 1 | L2/09-003R | | Moore, Lisa (2009-02-12), "General Category Change (B.14.5)", UTC #118 / L2 #215 Minutes |
| 4.1 | U+2090..2094 | 5 | L2/04-077 | N2705 | Anderson, Deborah; Everson, Michael (2004-02-02), Proposal to encode five Indo-Europeanist phonetic characters in the UCS |
| 4.1 | U+2090..2094 | 5 | L2/04-191 | N2788 | Anderson, Deborah; Everson, Michael (2004-06-07), Proposal to encode six Indo-Europeanist phonetic characters in the UCS |
| 4.1 | U+2090..2094 | 5 | L2/04-156R2 | | Moore, Lisa (2004-08-13), "Indo-European laryngeals (A.16)", UTC #99 Minutes |
| 6.0 | U+2095..209C | 8 | L2/09-028 | N3571 | Ruppel, Klaas; Aalto, Tero; Everson, Michael (2009-01-27), Proposal to encode additional characters for the Uralic Phonetic Alphabet |
| 6.0 | U+2095..209C | 8 | L2/09-195 | | Iancu, Laurențiu (2009-05-04), Proposal to reallocate eight phonetic subscripts |
| 6.0 | U+2095..209C | 8 | L2/09-104 | | Moore, Lisa (2009-05-20), "Consensus 119-C28", UTC #119 / L2 #216 Minutes |
| 6.0 | U+2095..209C | 8 | L2/09-304 | | Anderson, Deborah (2009-08-15), "T.4", US Position on PDAM 8 |
| 6.0 | U+2095..209C | 8 | L2/09-225R | | Moore, Lisa (2009-08-17), "B.1.4.4.2", UTC #120 / L2 #217 Minutes |
| 18.0 | U+208F | 1 | L2/25-061 | | Miller, Kirk (2025-02-14), Unicode request for compound stress mark |
| 18.0 | U+208F | 1 | L2/25-091R | | Kučera, Jan; et al. (2025-04-22), "1.7 Compound IPA stress mark", Recommendations to UTC #183 (April 2025) on Script Proposals |
| 18.0 | U+208F | 1 | L2/25-085 | | Leroy, Robin (2025-04-28), "Consensus 183-C10", UTC #183 Minutes, "Provisionally assign one code point U+208F ..." |
| 18.0 | U+208F | 1 | L2/25-226 | | "Consensus 185-C40", UTC #185 Minutes, 2025-10-29, "UTC accepts for encoding in Unicode 18.0 ..." |
| 18.0 | U+209D..209F | 3 | L2/24-219 | | Miller, Kirk (2024-10-18), Unicode request for subscript w y z and ɣ |
| 18.0 | U+209D..209F | 3 | L2/24-228 | | Kučera, Jan; et al. (2024-11-01), "2.8 Phonetic", Recommendations to UTC #181 (November 2024) on Script Proposals |
| 18.0 | U+209D..209F | 3 | L2/24-221 | | Constable, Peter (2024-11-12), "Consensus 181-C35", UTC #181 Minutes, "Provisionally assign ..." |
| 18.0 | U+209D..209F | 3 | L2/25-226 | | "Consensus 185-C40", UTC #185 Minutes, 2025-10-29, "UTC accepts for encoding in Unicode 18.0 ..." |

== See also ==
- Unicode superscripts and subscripts
- Phonetic symbols in Unicode
- Latin script in Unicode
