= Exponentiation =

Arithmetic operation

Graphs of y = b^{x} for various bases b. Each curve passes through the point (0, 1) because any nonzero number raised to the power of 0 is 1. At x = 1, the value of y equals the base because any number raised to the power of 1 is the number itself.

In mathematics, exponentiation, denoted b^{n}, is an operation involving two numbers: the base, b, and the exponent, n. When n is a positive integer, exponentiation corresponds to repeated multiplication of the base: that is, b^{n} is the product of multiplying b by itself n times:
$$b^n = \underbrace{b \times b \times \dots \times b \times b}_{n \text{ times}}.$$

The definition of exponentiation can be extended in a natural way to define $b^x$ for any positive real number base $b$ and any real number exponent $x$. A more involved definition supports arbitrary complex numbers as base and exponent. Other generalizations allow algebraic objects, such as square matrices, to be the base.

Exponentiation is a fundamental operation used throughout mathematics, science, and engineering.

== Notation ==
This article uses the three common notations for multiplication, $x\times y$, $xy$, and $x\cdot y$, interchangeably.

The exponent is usually shown as a superscript to the right of the base as b^{n}. Sometimes an up arrow or caret is used as the operator, e.g. $b \uparrow n$ or b^n.

In abstract algebra, when there are several operations that may be repeated, it is common to indicate the repeated operation by placing its symbol in the superscript, before the exponent. For example, if f is a function whose valued can be multiplied, $f^{\circ n}$ denotes exponentiation with respect to function composition, whereas $f^n$ may denote exponentiation with respect to multiplication. That is,

$$(f^n)(x)=(f(x))^n=f(x) \,f(x) \cdots f(x),$$

and

$$(f^{\circ n})(x)=f(f(\cdots f(f(x))\cdots)).$$

Commonly, $(f^n)(x)$ is denoted $f(x)^n,$ while $(f^{\circ n})(x)$ is denoted $f^n(x).$

== Terminology ==
The exponent is also known as the power, or, in British English, the index. The result of the exponentiation may also be referred to as a power.

The expression b^{n} is often read as "b to the power (of) n"; it may also be referred to as "b (raised) to the nth (power)", "the nth power of b", or, most briefly, "b to the n".

The expression b^{2} = b · b is called "the square of b" or "b squared", because the area of a square with side-length b is b^{2}. Similarly, the expression b^{3} = b · b · b is called "the cube of b" or "b cubed", because the volume of a cube with side-length b is b^{3}.

== Integer exponents ==
The exponentiation operation with integer exponents may be defined directly from elementary arithmetic operations.

=== Positive exponents ===
The definition of the exponentiation as an iterated multiplication can be formalized by using induction, and this definition can be used as soon as one has an associative multiplication:

The base case is
$$b^1 = b$$
and the recurrence is
$$b^{n+1} = b^n \cdot b.$$

The associativity of multiplication implies that for any positive integers m and n, when multiplying exponentiation results with the same base b and exponents m and n, the product is the same base b to the power of the sum m + n of the exponents:
$$b^{m+n} = b^m \cdot b^n,$$
and, when taking the result of exponentiation to another power, the base remains the same, and the exponents multiply:
$$(b^m)^n=b^{mn}.$$

These rules can be derived intuitively as follows:
$$\begin{align}
b^n \times b^m & = \underbrace{b \times \dots \times b}_{n \text{ times}} \times \underbrace{b \times \dots \times b}_{m \text{ times}}  \\[1ex]
&  = \underbrace{b \times \dots \times b}_{n+m \text{ times}}  = b^{n+m}
\end{align}$$
$$\begin{align}
(b^m)^n &= \underbrace{\underbrace{b \times \dots \times b}_{m \text{ times}} \times \dots \times \underbrace{b \times \dots \times b}_{m \text{ times}}}_{n \text{ times}}  \\[1ex]
&= \underbrace{b \times \dots \times b}_{m \times n \text{ times}} = b^{mn}
\end{align}$$

=== Zero exponent ===
A number raised to the 0 power is generally defined to be 1:
$$b^0=1.$$

This ensures that the multiplication rule mentioned above,
$$b^{m+n}=b^m\cdot b^n,$$
also holds for $m=0$:
$$b^n = 1 \times b^n = b^0 \times b^n = b^{0+n} = b^n.$$

This value is also obtained by the empty product convention, which may be used in every algebraic structure with a multiplication that has an identity.

Depending on the context, there may be an exception for zero to the power of zero.

=== Negative exponents ===
Exponentiation with negative exponents is defined by the following identity, which holds for any integer n and nonzero b:
$$b^{-n} = \frac{1}{b^n}$$
Raising 0 to a negative exponent, which is related to division by zero, is typically undefined but in some circumstances it may be interpreted as infinity.

This definition of exponentiation with negative exponents is the only one that allows extending the identity $b^{m+n}=b^m\cdot b^n$ to negative exponents (consider the case $m=-n$).

The same definition applies to invertible elements in a multiplicative monoid, that is, an algebraic structure, with an associative multiplication and a multiplicative identity denoted 1 (for example, the square matrices of a given dimension). In particular, in such a structure, the inverse of an invertible element x is standardly denoted $x^{-1}.$

=== Identities and properties ===
The following identities, often called exponent rules, hold for all integer exponents, provided that the base is not zero:
$$\begin{align}
b^m \cdot b^n &= b^{m + n} \\
\left(b^m\right)^n &= b^{m \cdot n} \\
b^n \cdot c^n &= (b \cdot c)^n
\end{align}$$

Unlike addition and multiplication, exponentiation is not commutative: for example, $2^3 = 8$, but reversing the operands gives the different value $3^2=9$. Also unlike addition and multiplication, exponentiation is not associative: for example, (2^{3})^{2} = 8^{2} = 64, whereas 2^{(3^{2})} = 2^{9} = 512. Without parentheses, the conventional order of operations for serial exponentiation in superscript notation is top-down (or right-associative), not bottom-up (or left-associative). That is,
$$b^{p^q} = b^{\left(p^q\right)},$$
which, in general, is different from
$$\left(b^p\right)^q = b^{p q} .$$

=== Powers of a sum ===
The powers of a sum can normally be computed from the powers of the summands by the binomial formula
$$(a+b)^n=\sum_{i=0}^n \binom{n}{i}a^ib^{n-i}=\sum_{i=0}^n \frac{n!}{i!(n-i)!}a^ib^{n-i}.$$

However, this formula is true only if the summands commute (i.e. that ab = ba), which is implied if they belong to a structure that is commutative. Otherwise, if a and b are, say, square matrices of the same size, this formula cannot be used. It follows that in computer algebra, many algorithms involving integer exponents must be changed when the exponentiation bases do not commute. Some general purpose computer algebra systems use a different notation (sometimes ^^ instead of ^) for exponentiation with non-commuting bases, which is then called non-commutative exponentiation.

=== Combinatorial interpretation ===
For nonnegative integers n and m, the value of n^{m} is the number of functions from a set of m elements to a set of n elements (see cardinal exponentiation). Such functions can be represented as m-tuples from an n-element set (or as m-letter words from an n-letter alphabet). Some examples for particular values of m and n are given in the following table:

n^{m}	The n^{m} possible m-tuples of elements from the set {1, ..., n}
0^{5} = 0	none
1^{4} = 1	(1, 1, 1, 1)
2^{3} = 8	(1, 1, 1), (1, 1, 2), (1, 2, 1), (1, 2, 2), (2, 1, 1), (2, 1, 2), (2, 2, 1), (2, 2, 2)
3^{2} = 9	(1, 1), (1, 2), (1, 3), (2, 1), (2, 2), (2, 3), (3, 1), (3, 2), (3, 3)
4^{1} = 4	(1), (2), (3), (4)
5^{0} = 1	()

=== Particular bases ===
==== Powers of ten ====
In the base ten (decimal) number system, integer powers of 10 are written as the digit 1 followed or preceded by a number of zeroes determined by the sign and magnitude of the exponent. For example, 10^{3} = 1000 and 10^{−4} = 0.0001.

Exponentiation with base 10 is used in scientific notation to denote large or small numbers. For instance, 299792458 m/s (the speed of light in vacuum, in metres per second) can be written as 2.99792458×10^{8} m/s and then approximated as 2.998×10^{8} m/s.

Metric prefixes based on powers of 10 are also used to describe small or large quantities. For example, the prefix kilo- means 10^{3} = 1000, so a kilometre is 1000 m.

==== Powers of two ====
The first negative powers of 2 have special names: $2^{-1}$is a half; $2^{-2}$ is a quarter.

Powers of 2 appear in set theory, since a set with n members has a power set, the set of all of its subsets, which has 2^{n} members.

Integer powers of 2 are important in computer science. The positive integer powers 2^{n} give the number of possible values for an n-bit integer binary number; for example, a byte may take 2^{8} = 256 different values. The binary number system expresses any number as a sum of powers of 2, and denotes it as a sequence of 0 and 1, separated by a binary point, where 1 indicates a power of 2 that appears in the sum; the exponent is determined by the place of this 1: the nonnegative exponents are the rank of the 1 on the left of the point (starting from 0), and the negative exponents are determined by the rank on the right of the point.

==== Powers of one ====
Every power of one equals: 1^{n} = 1.

==== Powers of zero ====
For a positive exponent n > 0, the nth power of zero is zero: 0^{n} = 0. For a negative exponent, $0^{-n}=1/0^n=1/0$ is undefined.

In some contexts (e.g., combinatorics), the expression 0^{0} is defined to be equal to $1$; in others (e.g., analysis), it is often undefined.

==== Powers of negative one ====
Since a negative number times another negative is positive, we have:
$$(-1)^n = \left\{\begin{array}{rl}
1 & \text{for even } n, \\
-1 & \text{for odd } n. \\
\end{array}\right.$$
Because of this, powers of −1 are useful for expressing alternating sequences. For a similar discussion of powers of the complex number i, see § nth roots of a complex number.

=== Large exponents ===
The limit of a sequence of powers of a number greater than one diverges; in other words, the sequence grows without bound:
$$b^n \rightarrow \infty \text{ as } n \rightarrow \infty \text{ when } b > 1$$
This can be read as "b to the power of n tends to +∞ as n tends to infinity when b is greater than one".

Powers of a number with absolute value less than one tend to zero:
$$b^n \rightarrow 0 \text{ as } n \rightarrow \infty \text{ when } \left|b\right| < 1$$
Any power of one is always one:
$$b^n = 1 \text{ for all } n \text{ for } b = 1$$

Powers of a negative number $b \leq -1$ alternate between positive and negative as n alternates between even and odd, and thus do not tend to any limit as n grows.

If the exponentiated number varies while tending to 1 as the exponent tends to infinity, then the limit is not necessarily one of those above. A particularly important case is
$$(1 + \frac{1}{n})^n \rightarrow e \text{ as } n \rightarrow \infty$$

See § Exponential function below.

Other limits, in particular those of expressions that take on an indeterminate form, are described in § Limits of powers below.

=== Power functions ===
Power functions for n = 1, 3, 5

Power functions for n = 2, 4, 6

Real functions of the form $f(x) = cx^n$, where $c \ne 0$, are sometimes called power functions. When $n$ is an integer and $n \ge 1$, two primary families exist: for $n$ even, and for $n$ odd. In general for $c > 0$, when $n$ is even $f(x) = cx^n$ will tend towards positive infinity with increasing $x$, and also towards positive infinity with decreasing $x$. All graphs from the family of even power functions have the general shape of $y=cx^2$, flattening more in the middle as $n$ increases. Functions with this kind of symmetry ($f(-x)= f(x)$) are called even functions.

When $n$ is odd, $f(x)$'s asymptotic behavior reverses from positive $x$ to negative $x$. For $c > 0$, $f(x) = cx^n$ will also tend towards positive infinity with increasing $x$, but towards negative infinity with decreasing $x$. All graphs from the family of odd power functions have the general shape of $y=cx^3$, flattening more in the middle as $n$ increases and losing all flatness there in the straight line for $n=1$. Functions with this kind of symmetry ($f(-x)= -f(x)$) are called odd functions.

For $c < 0$, the same behavior occurs, but with positive and negative infinity exchanged.

=== Table of powers ===
b	b^{2}	b^{3}	b^{4}	b^{5}	b^{6}	b^{7}	b^{8}	b^{9}	b^{10}	b^{n} for n = 11	OEIS number
1	1	1	1	1	1	1	1	1	1	1	A000012
2	4	8	16	32	64	128	256	512	1024	2048	A000079
3	9	27	81	243	729	2187	6561	19683	59049	177147	A000244
4	16	64	256	1024	4096	16384	65536	262144	1048576	4194304	A000302
5	25	125	625	3125	15625	78125	390625	1953125	9765625	48828125	A000351
6	36	216	1296	7776	46656	279936	1679616	10077696	60466176	362797056	A000400
7	49	343	2401	16807	117649	823543	5764801	40353607	282475249	1977326743	A000420
8	64	512	4096	32768	262144	2097152	16777216	134217728	1073741824	8589934592	A001018
9	81	729	6561	59049	531441	4782969	43046721	387420489	3486784401	31381059609	A001019
10	100	1000	10000	100000	1000000	10000000	100000000	1000000000	10000000000	100000000000	A011557
11	121	1331	14641	161051	1771561	19487171	214358881	2357947691	25937424601	285311670611	
OEIS number	A000290	A000578	A000583	A000584	A001014	A001015	A001016	A001017	A008454		

== Rational exponents ==
From top to bottom: x^{1/8}, x^{1/4}, x^{1/2}, x^{1}, x^{2}, x^{4}, x^{8}.

If x is a nonnegative real number, and n is a positive integer, $x^{1/n}$ or $\sqrt[n]x$ denotes the unique nonnegative real nth root of x, that is, the unique nonnegative real number y such that $y^n=x.$

If x is a positive real number, and $\frac pq$ is a rational number, with p and q > 0 integers, then $x^{p/q}$ is defined as
$$x^\frac{p}{q} = \left(x^p\right)^\frac{1}{q} = \sqrt[q]{x^p} = (x^\frac{1}{q})^p = \left(\sqrt[q]{x}\right)^p.$$
The equality on the right may be derived by setting $y=x^\frac 1q,$ and writing $(x^\frac 1q)^p=y^p=\left((y^p)^q\right)^\frac 1q=\left((y^q)^p\right)^\frac 1q=(x^p)^\frac 1q.$

If r is a positive rational number, 0^{r} = 0, by definition.

All these definitions are required for extending the identity $(x^r)^s = x^{rs}$ to rational exponents.

On the other hand, there are problems with the extension of these definitions to bases that are not positive real numbers. For example, a negative real number has a real nth root, which is negative, if n is odd, and no real root if n is even. In the latter case, whichever complex nth root one chooses for $x^\frac 1n$, the identity $(x^a)^b=x^{ab}$ cannot be satisfied. For example,
$$\left((-1)^2\right)^\frac 12 = 1^\frac 12= 1\neq (-1)^{2\cdot\frac 12} =(-1)^1=-1.$$

See § Real exponents and § Non-integer exponents with a complex base for details on the way these problems may be handled.

== Real exponents ==
For positive real numbers, exponentiation to real powers can be defined in two equivalent ways, either by extending the rational powers to reals by continuity (§ Limits of rational exponents, below), or in terms of the logarithm of the base and the exponential function (§ Powers via logarithms, below). The result is always a positive real number, and the identities and properties shown above for integer exponents remain true with these definitions for real exponents. The second definition is more commonly used, since it generalizes straightforwardly to complex exponents.

On the other hand, exponentiation to a real power of a negative real number is much more difficult to define consistently, as it may be non-real and have several values. One may choose one of these values, called the principal value, but there is no choice of the principal value for which the identity
$$\left(b^r\right)^s = b^{r s}$$
is true; see § Failure of power and logarithm identities. Therefore, exponentiation with a basis that is not a positive real number is generally viewed as a multivalued function.

=== Limits of rational exponents ===
The limit of e^{1/n} is e^{0} = 1 when n tends to the infinity.

Since any irrational number can be expressed as the limit of a sequence of rational numbers, exponentiation of a positive real number b with an arbitrary real exponent x can be defined by continuity with the rule
$$b^x = \lim_{r (\in \mathbb{Q}) \to x} b^r \quad (b \in \mathbb{R}^+,\, x \in \mathbb{R}),$$
where the limit is taken over rational values of r only. This limit exists for every positive b and every real x.

For example, if x = π, the non-terminating decimal representation π = 3.14159... and the monotonicity of the rational powers can be used to obtain intervals bounded by rational powers that are as small as desired, and must contain $b^\pi:$
$$\left[b^3, b^4\right], \left[b^{3.1}, b^{3.2}\right], \left[b^{3.14}, b^{3.15}\right], \left[b^{3.141}, b^{3.142}\right], \left[b^{3.1415}, b^{3.1416}\right], \left[b^{3.14159}, b^{3.14160}\right], \ldots$$
So, the upper bounds and the lower bounds of the intervals form two sequences that have the same limit, denoted $b^\pi.$

This defines $b^x$ for every positive b and real x as a continuous function of b and x.

=== Exponential function ===
The exponential function may be defined as $x\mapsto e^x,$ where $e\approx 2.718$ is Euler's number, but to avoid circular reasoning, this definition cannot be used here. Rather, we give an independent definition of the exponential function $\exp(x),$ and of $e=\exp(1)$, relying only on positive integer powers (repeated multiplication). Then we sketch the proof that this agrees with the previous definition: $\exp(x)=e^x.$

There are many equivalent ways to define the exponential function, one of them being
$$\exp(x) = \lim_{n\rightarrow\infty} \left(1 + \frac{x}{n}\right)^n.$$

One has $\exp(0)=1,$ and the exponential identity (or multiplication rule) $\exp(x)\exp(y)=\exp(x+y)$ holds as well, since
$$\exp(x)\exp(y) = \lim_{n\rightarrow\infty} \left(1 + \frac{x}{n}\right)^n\left(1 + \frac{y}{n}\right)^n = \lim_{n\rightarrow\infty} \left(1 + \frac{x+y}{n} + \frac{xy}{n^2}\right)^n,$$
and the second-order term $\frac{xy}{n^2}$ does not affect the limit, yielding $\exp(x)\exp(y) = \exp(x+y)$.

Euler's number can be defined as $e=\exp(1)$. It follows from the preceding equations that $\exp(x)=e^x$ when x is an integer (this results from the repeated-multiplication definition of the exponentiation). If x is real, $\exp(x)=e^x$ results from the definitions given in preceding sections, by using the exponential identity if x is rational, and the continuity of the exponential function otherwise.

The limit that defines the exponential function converges for every complex value of x, and therefore it can be used to extend the definition of $\exp(z)$, and thus $e^z,$ from the real numbers to any complex argument z. This extended exponential function still satisfies the exponential identity, and is commonly used for defining exponentiation for complex base and exponent.

=== Powers via logarithms ===
The definition of e^{x} as the exponential function allows defining b^{x} for every positive real numbers b, in terms of exponential and logarithm function. Specifically, the fact that the natural logarithm ln(x) is the inverse of the exponential function e^{x} means that one has
$$b = \exp(\ln b)=e^{\ln b}$$
for every b > 0. For preserving the identity $(e^x)^y=e^{xy},$ one must have
$$b^x=\left(e^{\ln b} \right)^x = e^{x \ln b}$$

So, $e^{x \ln b}$ can be used as an alternative definition of b^{x} for any positive real b. This agrees with the definition given above using rational exponents and continuity, with the advantage to extend straightforwardly to any complex exponent.

== Complex exponents with a positive real base ==
If b is a positive real number, exponentiation with base b and complex exponent z is defined by means of the exponential function with complex argument (see the end of § Exponential function, above) as
$$b^z = e^{(z\ln b)},$$
where $\ln b$ denotes the natural logarithm of b.

This satisfies the identity
$$b^{z+t} = b^z b^t,$$
In general, $\left(b^z\right)^t$ is not defined, since b^{z} is not a real number. If a meaning is given to the exponentiation of a complex number (see § Non-integer exponents with a complex base, below), one has, in general,
$$\left(b^z\right)^t \ne b^{zt},$$
unless z is real or t is an integer.

Euler's formula,
$$e^{iy} = \cos y + i \sin y,$$
allows expressing the polar form of $b^z$ in terms of the real and imaginary parts of z, namely
$$b^{x+iy}= b^x(\cos(y\ln b)+i\sin(y\ln b)),$$
where the absolute value of the trigonometric factor is one. This results from
$$b^{x+iy}=b^x b^{iy}=b^x e^{iy\ln b} =b^x(\cos(y\ln b)+i\sin(y\ln b)).$$

== Non-integer exponents with a complex base ==
In the preceding sections, exponentiation with non-integer exponents has been defined for positive real bases only. For other bases, difficulties appear already with the apparently simple case of nth roots, that is, of exponents $1/n,$ where n is a positive integer. Although the general theory of exponentiation with non-integer exponents applies to nth roots, this case can be treated independently, as it does not depend on the use of complex logarithms.

=== nth roots of a complex number ===
Every nonzero complex number z may be written in polar form as
$$z=\rho e^{i\theta}=\rho(\cos \theta +i \sin \theta),$$
where $\rho$ is the absolute value of z, and $\theta$ is its argument. The argument is defined up to an integer multiple of 2π; this means that, if $\theta$ is the argument of a complex number, then $\theta +2k\pi$ is also an argument of the same complex number for every integer $k$.

The polar form of the product of two complex numbers is obtained by multiplying the absolute values and adding the arguments. It follows that the polar form of an nth root of a complex number can be obtained by taking the nth root of the absolute value and dividing its argument by n:
$$\left(\rho e^{i\theta}\right)^\frac 1n=\sqrt[n]\rho \,e^\frac{i\theta}n.$$

If $2\pi$ is added to $\theta$, the complex number is not changed, but this adds $2i\pi/n$ to the argument of the nth root, and provides a new nth root. This can be done n times ($k=0,1,...,n-1$), and provides the n nth roots of the complex number:
$$\left(\rho e^{i(\theta+2k\pi)}\right)^\frac 1n=\sqrt[n]\rho \,e^\frac{i(\theta+2k\pi)}n.$$

It is usual to choose one of the n nth roots as the principal root. The common choice is to choose the nth root for which $-\pi<\theta\le \pi,$ that is, the nth root that has the largest real part, and, if there are two, the one with positive imaginary part. This makes the principal nth root a continuous function in the whole complex plane, except for negative real values of the radicand. This function equals the usual nth root for positive real radicands. For negative real radicands, and odd exponents, the principal nth root is not real, although the usual nth root is real. Analytic continuation shows that the principal nth root is the unique complex differentiable function that extends the usual nth root to the complex plane without the nonpositive real numbers.

If the complex number is moved around zero by increasing its argument, after an increment of $2\pi,$ the complex number comes back to its initial position, and its nth roots are permuted circularly (they are multiplied by $e^{2i\pi/n}$). This shows that it is not possible to define a nth root function that is continuous in the whole complex plane.

==== Roots of unity ====
The three third roots of 1

The nth roots of unity are the $n$ complex numbers such that $\omega^n = 1$, where $n$ is a positive integer. They arise in various areas of mathematics, such as in discrete Fourier transform or algebraic solutions of algebraic equations (Lagrange resolvent).

The nth roots of unity are the $n$ first powers of $\omega =e^{2\pi i/n}$, that is $1=\omega^0=\omega^n$, $\omega=\omega^1$, $\omega^2$, ..., $\omega^{n-1}$. The nth roots of unity that have this generating property are called primitive nth roots of unity; they have the form $\omega^k=e^{2k\pi i/n}$ with k coprime with n. The unique primitive square root of unity is $-1;$ the primitive fourth roots of unity are $i$ and $-i$.

The nth roots of unity allow expressing all nth roots of a complex number z as the n products of a given nth roots of z with a nth root of unity.

Geometrically, the nth roots of unity lie on the unit circle of the complex plane at the vertices of a regular n-gon with one vertex on the real number 1.

As the number $e^{2k\pi i/n}$ is the primitive nth root of unity with the smallest positive argument, it is called the principal primitive nth root of unity, sometimes shortened as principal nth root of unity, although this terminology can be confused with the principal value of $1^{1/n}$, which is 1.

=== Complex exponentiation ===
Defining exponentiation with complex bases leads to difficulties that are similar to those described in the preceding section, except that there are, in general, infinitely many possible values for $z^w$. So, either a principal value is defined, which is not continuous for the values of z that are real and nonpositive, or $z^w$ is defined as a multivalued function.

In all cases, the complex logarithm is used to define complex exponentiation as
$$z^w=e^{w\log z},$$
where $\log z$ is the variant of the complex logarithm that is used, which is a function or a multivalued function such that
$$e^{\log z}=z$$
for every z in its domain of definition.

==== Principal value ====
The principal value of the complex logarithm is the unique continuous function, commonly denoted $\log,$ such that, for every nonzero complex number z,
$$e^{\log z}=z,$$
and the argument of z satisfies
$$-\pi <\operatorname{Arg}z \le \pi.$$
The principal value of the complex logarithm is not defined for $z=0,$ it is discontinuous at negative real values of z, and it is holomorphic (that is, complex differentiable) elsewhere. If z is real and positive, the principal value of the complex logarithm is the natural logarithm: $\log z=\ln z.$

The principal value of $z^w$ is defined as $z^w=e^{w\log z},$ where $\log z$ is the principal value of the logarithm.

The function $(z,w)\to z^w$ is holomorphic except in the neighbourhood of the points where z is real and nonpositive.

If z is real and positive, the principal value of $z^w$ equals its usual value defined above. If $w=1/n,$ where n is an integer, this principal value is the same as the one defined above.

==== Multivalued function ====
In some contexts, there is a problem with the discontinuity of the principal values of $\log z$ and $z^w$ at the negative real values of z. In this case, it is useful to consider these functions as multivalued functions.

If $\log z$ denotes one of the values of the multivalued logarithm (typically its principal value), the other values are $2ik\pi +\log z,$ where k is any integer. Similarly, if $z^w$ is one value of the exponentiation, then the other values are given by
$$e^{w(2ik\pi +\log z)} = z^we^{2ik\pi w},$$
where k is any integer.

Different values of k give different values of $z^w$ unless w is a rational number, that is, there is an integer d such that dw is an integer. This results from the periodicity of the exponential function, more specifically, that $e^a=e^b$ if and only if $a-b$ is an integer multiple of $2\pi i.$

If $w=\frac mn$ is a rational number with m and n coprime integers with $n>0,$ then $z^w$ has exactly n values. In the case $m=1,$ these values are the same as those described in § nth roots of a complex number. If w is an integer, there is only one value that agrees with that of § Integer exponents.

The multivalued exponentiation is holomorphic for $z\ne 0,$ in the sense that its graph consists of several sheets that define each a holomorphic function in the neighborhood of every point. If z varies continuously along a circle around 0, then, after a turn, the value of $z^w$ has changed of sheet.

==== Computation ====
The canonical form $x+iy$ of $z^w$ can be computed from the canonical form of z and w. Although this can be described by a single formula, it is clearer to split the computation in several steps.

- Polar form of z. If $z=a+ib$ is the canonical form of z (a and b being real), then its polar form is
  $$z=\rho e^{i\theta}= \rho (\cos\theta + i \sin\theta),$$
  with $\rho=\sqrt{a^2+b^2}$ and $\theta=\operatorname{atan2}(b,a)$, where $\operatorname{atan2}$ is the two-argument arctangent function.
- Logarithm of z. The principal value of this logarithm is $\log z=\ln \rho+i\theta,$ where $\ln$ denotes the natural logarithm. The other values of the logarithm are obtained by adding $2ik\pi$ for any integer k.
- Canonical form of $w\log z.$ If $w=c+di$ with c and d real, the values of $w\log z$ are
  $$w\log z = (c\ln \rho - d\theta-2dk\pi) +i (d\ln \rho + c\theta+2ck\pi),$$
  the principal value corresponding to $k=0.$
- Final result. Using the identities $e^{x+y}=e^xe^y$ and $e^{y\ln x} = x^y,$ one gets
  $$z^w=\rho^c e^{-d(\theta+2k\pi)} \left(\cos (d\ln \rho + c\theta+2ck\pi) +i\sin(d\ln \rho + c\theta+2ck\pi)\right),$$
  with $k=0$ for the principal value.

===== Examples =====
- $i^i$
  The polar form of i is $i=e^{i\pi/2},$ and the values of $\log i$ are thus
  $$\log i=i\left(\frac \pi 2 +2k\pi\right).$$
  It follows that
  $$i^i=e^{i\log i}=e^{-\frac \pi 2} e^{-2k\pi}.$$
  So, all values of $i^i$ are real, the principal one being
  $$e^{-\frac \pi 2} \approx 0.2079.$$
- $(-2)^{3+4i}$
  Similarly, the polar form of −2 is $-2 = 2e^{i \pi}.$ So, the above described method gives the values
  $$\begin{align}
(-2)^{3 + 4i} &= 2^3 e^{-4(\pi+2k\pi)} (\cos(4\ln 2 + 3(\pi +2k\pi)) +i\sin(4\ln 2 + 3(\pi+2k\pi)))\\
&=-2^3 e^{-4(\pi+2k\pi)}(\cos(4\ln 2) +i\sin(4\ln 2)).
\end{align}$$
  In this case, all the values have the same argument $4\ln 2,$ and different absolute values.

In both examples, all values of $z^w$ have the same argument. More generally, this is true if and only if the real part of w is an integer.

==== Failure of power and logarithm identities ====
Some identities for powers and logarithms for positive real numbers will fail for complex numbers, no matter how complex powers and complex logarithms are defined as single-valued functions. For example:

- The identity log(b^{x}) = x ⋅ log b holds whenever b is a positive real number and x is a real number. But for the principal branch of the complex logarithm one has
  $$\log((-i)^2) = \log(-1) = i\pi \neq 2\log(-i) = 2\log(e^{-i\pi/2})=2\,\frac{-i\pi}{2} = -i\pi$$
  Regardless of which branch of the logarithm is used, a similar failure of the identity will exist. The best that can be said (if only using this result) is that:
  $$\log w^z \equiv z \log w \pmod{2 \pi i}$$
  This identity does not hold even when considering log as a multivalued function. The possible values of log(w^{z}) contain those of z ⋅ log w as a proper subset. Using Log(w) for the principal value of log(w) and m, n as any integers the possible values of both sides are:
  $$\begin{align}
\left\{\log w^z \right\} &= \left\{ z \cdot \operatorname{Log} w + z \cdot 2 \pi i n + 2 \pi i m \mid m,n\in\Z\right\} \\
\left\{z \log w \right\} &= \left\{ z \operatorname{Log} w + z \cdot 2 \pi i n \mid n\in \Z\right\}
\end{align}$$
- The identities (bc)^{x} = b^{x}c^{x} and (b/c)^{x} = b^{x}/c^{x} are valid when b and c are positive real numbers and x is a real number. But, for the principal values, one has
  $$(-1 \cdot -1)^\frac{1}{2} =1 \neq (-1)^\frac{1}{2} (-1)^\frac{1}{2} =i \cdot i=i^2 =-1$$
  and
  $$\left(\frac{1}{-1}\right)^\frac{1}{2} = (-1)^\frac{1}{2} = i \neq \frac{1^\frac{1}{2}}{(-1)^\frac{1}{2}} = \frac{1}{i} = -i$$
  On the other hand, when x is an integer, the identities are valid for all nonzero complex numbers. If exponentiation is considered as a multivalued function then the possible values of (−1 ⋅ −1)^{1/2} are {1, −1}. The identity holds, but saying {1} = {(−1 ⋅ −1)^{1/2}} is incorrect.
- The identity (e^{x})^{y} = e^{xy} holds for real numbers x and y, but assuming its truth for complex numbers leads to the following paradox, discovered in 1827 by Clausen: For any integer n, we have:
  1. $e^{1 + 2 \pi i n} = e^1 e^{2 \pi i n} = e \cdot 1 = e$
  2. $\left(e^{1 + 2\pi i n}\right)^{1 + 2 \pi i n} = e\qquad$ (taking the $(1 + 2 \pi i n)$-th power of both sides)
  3. $e^{1 + 4 \pi i n - 4 \pi^2 n^2} = e\qquad$ (using $\left(e^x\right)^y = e^{xy}$ and expanding the exponent)
  4. $e^1 e^{4 \pi i n} e^{-4 \pi^2 n^2} = e\qquad$ (using $e^{x+y} = e^x e^y$)
  5. $e^{-4 \pi^2 n^2} = 1\qquad$ (dividing by e)
  but this is false when the integer n is nonzero.
  The error is the following: by definition, $e^y$ is a notation for $\exp(y),$ a true function, and $x^y$ is a notation for $\exp(y\log x),$ which is a multi-valued function. Thus the notation is ambiguous when x = e. Here, before expanding the exponent, the second line should be
  $$\exp\left((1 + 2\pi i n)\log \exp(1 + 2\pi i n)\right) = \exp(1 + 2\pi i n).$$
  Therefore, when expanding the exponent, one has implicitly supposed that $\log \exp z =z$ for complex values of z, which is wrong, as the complex logarithm is multivalued. In other words, the wrong identity (e^{x})^{y} = e^{xy} must be replaced by the identity
  $$\left(e^x\right)^y = e^{y\log e^x},$$
  which is a true identity between multivalued functions.

== Irrationality and transcendence ==
If b is a positive real algebraic number, and x is a rational number, then b^{x} is an algebraic number. This results from the theory of algebraic extensions. This remains true if b is any algebraic number, in which case, all values of b^{x} (as a multivalued function) are algebraic. If x is irrational (that is, not rational), and both b and x are algebraic, the Gelfond–Schneider theorem asserts that all values of b^{x} are transcendental (that is, not algebraic), except if b equals 0 or 1.

In other words, if x is irrational and $b\not\in \{0,1\},$ then at least one of b, x and b^{x} is transcendental.

== Integer powers in algebra ==
The definition of exponentiation with positive integer exponents as repeated multiplication may apply to any associative operation denoted as a multiplication. (Note: More generally, power associativity is sufficient for the definition.) The definition of x^{0} requires further the existence of a multiplicative identity.

An algebraic structure consisting of a set together with an associative operation denoted multiplicatively, and a multiplicative identity denoted by 1 is a monoid. In such a monoid, exponentiation of an element x is defined inductively by

- $x^0 = 1,$
- $x^{n+1} = x x^n$ for every nonnegative integer n.

If n is a negative integer, $x^n$ is defined only if x has a multiplicative inverse. In this case, the inverse of x is denoted x^{−1}, and x^{n} is defined as $\left(x^{-1}\right)^{-n}.$

Exponentiation with integer exponents obeys the following laws, for x and y in the algebraic structure, and m and n integers:
$$\begin{align}
x^0&=1\\
x^{m+n}&=x^m x^n\\
(x^m)^n&=x^{mn}\\
(xy)^n&=x^n y^n \quad \text{if } xy=yx, \text{and, in particular, if the multiplication is commutative.}
\end{align}$$

These definitions are widely used in many areas of mathematics, notably for groups, rings, fields, square matrices (which form a ring). They apply also to functions from a set to itself, which form a monoid under function composition. This includes, as specific instances, geometric transformations, and endomorphisms of any mathematical structure.

=== In a group ===
A multiplicative group is a set with as associative operation denoted as multiplication, that has an identity element, and such that every element has an inverse.

So, if G is a group, $x^n$ is defined for every $x\in G$ and every integer n.

The set of all powers of an element of a group form a subgroup. A group (or subgroup) that consists of all powers of a specific element x is the cyclic group generated by x. If all the powers of x are distinct, the group is isomorphic to the additive group $\Z$ of the integers. Otherwise, the cyclic group is finite (it has a finite number of elements), and its number of elements is the order of x. If the order of x is n, then $x^n=x^0=1,$ and the cyclic group generated by x consists of the n first powers of x (starting indifferently from the exponent 0 or 1).

Order of elements play a fundamental role in group theory. For example, the order of an element in a finite group is always a divisor of the number of elements of the group (the order of the group). The possible orders of group elements are important in the study of the structure of a group (see Sylow theorems), and in the classification of finite simple groups.

Superscript notation is also used for conjugation; that is, g^{h} = h^{−1}gh, where g and h are elements of a group. This notation cannot be confused with exponentiation, since the superscript is not an integer. The motivation of this notation is that conjugation obeys some of the laws of exponentiation, namely $(g^h)^k=g^{hk}$ and $(gh)^k=g^kh^k.$

=== In a ring ===
In a ring, it may occur that some nonzero elements satisfy $x^n=0$ for some integer n. Such an element is said to be nilpotent. In a commutative ring, the nilpotent elements form an ideal, called the nilradical of the ring.

If the nilradical is reduced to the zero ideal (that is, if $x\neq 0$ implies $x^n\neq 0$ for every positive integer n), the commutative ring is said to be reduced. Reduced rings are important in algebraic geometry, since the coordinate ring of an affine algebraic set is always a reduced ring.

More generally, given an ideal I in a commutative ring R, the set of the elements of R that have a power in I is an ideal, called the radical of I. The nilradical is the radical of the zero ideal. A radical ideal is an ideal that equals its own radical. In a polynomial ring $k[x_1, \ldots, x_n]$ over a field k, an ideal is radical if and only if it is the set of all polynomials that are zero on an affine algebraic set (this is a consequence of Hilbert's Nullstellensatz).

=== Matrices and linear operators ===
If A is a square matrix, then the product of A with itself n times is called the matrix power. Also $A^0$ is defined to be the identity matrix, and if A is invertible, then $A^{-n} = \left(A^{-1}\right)^n$.

Matrix powers appear often in the context of discrete dynamical systems, where the matrix A expresses a transition from a state vector x of some system to the next state Ax of the system. This is the standard interpretation of a Markov chain, for example. Then $A^2x$ is the state of the system after two time steps, and so forth: $A^nx$ is the state of the system after n time steps. The matrix power $A^n$ is the transition matrix between the state now and the state at a time n steps in the future. So computing matrix powers is equivalent to solving the evolution of the dynamical system. In many cases, matrix powers can be expediently computed by using eigenvalues and eigenvectors.

Apart from matrices, more general linear operators can also be exponentiated. An example is the derivative operator of calculus, $d/dx$, which is a linear operator acting on functions $f(x)$ to give a new function $(d/dx)f(x) = f'(x)$. The nth power of the differentiation operator is the nth derivative:
$$\left(\frac{d}{dx}\right)^nf(x) = \frac{d^n}{dx^n}f(x) = f^{(n)}(x).$$

These examples are for discrete exponents of linear operators, but in many circumstances it is also desirable to define powers of such operators with continuous exponents. This is the starting point of the mathematical theory of semigroups. Just as computing matrix powers with discrete exponents solves discrete dynamical systems, so does computing matrix powers with continuous exponents solve systems with continuous dynamics. Examples include approaches to solving the heat equation, Schrödinger equation, wave equation, and other partial differential equations including a time evolution. The special case of exponentiating the derivative operator to a non-integer power is called the fractional derivative which, together with the fractional integral, is one of the basic operations of the fractional calculus.

=== Finite fields ===
A field is an algebraic structure in which multiplication, addition, subtraction, and division are defined and satisfy the properties that multiplication is associative and every nonzero element has a multiplicative inverse. This implies that exponentiation with integer exponents is well-defined, except for nonpositive powers of 0. Common examples are the field of complex numbers, the real numbers and the rational numbers, considered earlier in this article, which are all infinite.

A finite field is a field with a finite number of elements. This number of elements is either a prime number or a prime power; that is, it has the form $q=p^k,$ where p is a prime number, and k is a positive integer. For every such q, there are fields with q elements. The fields with q elements are all isomorphic, which allows, in general, working as if there were only one field with q elements, denoted $\mathbb F_q.$

One has
$$x^q=x$$
for every $x\in \mathbb F_q.$

A primitive element in $\mathbb F_q$ is an element g such that the set of the q − 1 first powers of g (that is, $\{g^1=g, g^2, \ldots, g^{p-1}=g^0=1\}$) equals the set of the nonzero elements of $\mathbb F_q.$ There are $\varphi (p-1)$ primitive elements in $\mathbb F_q,$ where $\varphi$ is Euler's totient function.

In $\mathbb F_q,$ the freshman's dream identity
$$(x+y)^p = x^p+y^p$$
is true for the exponent p. As $x^p=x$ in $\mathbb F_q,$ It follows that the map
$$\begin{align}
F\colon{} & \mathbb F_q \to \mathbb F_q\\
& x\mapsto x^p
\end{align}$$
is linear over $\mathbb F_q,$ and is a field automorphism, called the Frobenius automorphism. If $q=p^k,$ the field $\mathbb F_q$ has k automorphisms, which are the k first powers (under composition) of F. In other words, the Galois group of $\mathbb F_q$ is cyclic of order k, generated by the Frobenius automorphism.

The Diffie–Hellman key exchange is an application of exponentiation in finite fields that is widely used for secure communications. It uses the fact that exponentiation is computationally inexpensive, whereas the inverse operation, the discrete logarithm, is computationally expensive. More precisely, if g is a primitive element in $\mathbb F_q,$ then $g^e$ can be efficiently computed with exponentiation by squaring for any e, even if q is large, while there is no known computationally practical algorithm that allows retrieving e from $g^e$ if q is sufficiently large.

== Powers of sets ==
The Cartesian product of two sets S and T is the set of the ordered pairs $(x,y)$ such that $x\in S$ and $y\in T.$ This operation is not properly commutative nor associative, but has these properties up to canonical isomorphisms, that allow identifying, for example, $(x,(y,z)),$ $((x,y),z),$ and $(x,y,z).$

This allows defining the nth power $S^n$ of a set S as the set of all n-tuples $(x_1, \ldots, x_n)$ of elements of S.

When S is endowed with some structure, it is frequent that $S^n$ is naturally endowed with a similar structure. In this case, the term "direct product" is generally used instead of "Cartesian product", and exponentiation denotes product structure. For example $\R^n$ (where $\R$ denotes the real numbers) denotes the Cartesian product of n copies of $\R,$ as well as their direct product as vector space, topological spaces, rings, etc.

=== Sets as exponents ===
A n-tuple $(x_1, \ldots, x_n)$ of elements of S can be considered as a function from $\{1,\ldots, n\}.$ This generalizes to the following notation.

Given two sets S and T, the set of all functions from T to S is denoted $S^T$. This exponential notation is justified by the following canonical isomorphisms (for the first one, see Currying):
$$(S^T)^U\cong S^{T\times U},$$
$$S^{T\sqcup U}\cong S^T\times S^U,$$
where $\times$ denotes the Cartesian product, and $\sqcup$ the disjoint union.

One can use sets as exponents for other operations on sets, typically for direct sums of abelian groups, vector spaces, or modules. For distinguishing direct sums from direct products, the exponent of a direct sum is placed between parentheses. For example, $\R^\N$ denotes the vector space of the infinite sequences of real numbers, and $\R^{(\N)}$ the vector space of those sequences that have a finite number of nonzero elements. The latter has a basis consisting of the sequences with exactly one nonzero element that equals 1, while the Hamel bases of the former cannot be explicitly described (because their existence involves Zorn's lemma).

In this context, 2 can represents the set $\{0,1\}.$ So, $2^S$ denotes the power set of S, that is the set of the functions from S to $\{0,1\},$ which can be identified with the set of the subsets of S, by mapping each function to the inverse image of 1.

This fits in with the exponentiation of cardinal numbers, in the sense that |S^{T}| = |S|^{|T|}, where |X| is the cardinality of X.

=== In category theory ===
In the category of sets, the morphisms between sets X and Y are the functions from X to Y. It results that the set of the functions from X to Y that is denoted $Y^X$ in the preceding section can also be denoted $\hom(X,Y).$ The isomorphism $(S^T)^U\cong S^{T\times U}$ can be rewritten
$$\hom(U,S^T)\cong \hom(T\times U,S).$$
This means the functor "exponentiation to the power T " is a right adjoint to the functor "direct product with T ".

This generalizes to the definition of exponentiation in a category in which finite direct products exist: in such a category, the functor $X\to X^T$ is, if it exists, a right adjoint to the functor $Y\to T\times Y.$ A category is called a Cartesian closed category, if direct products exist, and the functor $Y\to X\times Y$ has a right adjoint for every T.

== Repeated exponentiation ==
Just as exponentiation of natural numbers is motivated by repeated multiplication, it is possible to define an operation based on repeated exponentiation; this operation is sometimes called hyper-4 or tetration. Iterating tetration leads to another operation, and so on, a concept named hyperoperation. This sequence of operations is expressed by the Ackermann function and Knuth's up-arrow notation. Just as exponentiation grows faster than multiplication, which is faster-growing than addition, tetration is faster-growing than exponentiation. Evaluated at (3, 3), the functions addition, multiplication, exponentiation, and tetration yield 6, 9, 27, and 7625597484987 (=3^{27} = 3^{3^{3}} = ^{3}3) respectively.

== Limits of powers ==
Zero to the power of zero gives a number of examples of limits that are of the indeterminate form 0^{0}. The limits in these examples exist, but have different values, showing that the two-variable function x^{y} has no limit at the point (0, 0). One may consider at what points this function does have a limit.

More precisely, consider the function $f(x,y) = x^y$ defined on $D = \{(x, y) \in \mathbf{R}^2 : x > 0 \}$. Then D can be viewed as a subset of R̅^{2} (that is, the set of all pairs (x, y) with x, y belonging to the extended real number line R̅ = [−∞, +∞], endowed with the product topology), which will contain the points at which the function f has a limit.

In fact, f has a limit at all accumulation points of D, except for (0, 0), (+∞, 0), (1, +∞) and (1, −∞). Accordingly, this allows one to define the powers x^{y} by continuity whenever 0 ≤ x ≤ +∞, −∞ ≤ y ≤ +∞, except for 0^{0}, (+∞)^{0}, 1^{+∞} and 1^{−∞}, which remain indeterminate forms.

Under this definition by continuity, we obtain:

- x^{+∞} = +∞ and x^{−∞} = 0, when 1 < x ≤ +∞.
- x^{+∞} = 0 and x^{−∞} = +∞, when 0 < x < 1.
- 0^{y} = 0 and (+∞)^{y} = +∞, when 0 < y ≤ +∞.
- 0^{y} = +∞ and (+∞)^{y} = 0, when −∞ ≤ y < 0.

These powers are obtained by taking limits of x^{y} for positive values of x. This method does not permit a definition of x^{y} when x < 0, since pairs (x, y) with x < 0 are not accumulation points of D.

On the other hand, when n is an integer, the power x^{n} is already meaningful for all values of x, including negative ones. This may make the definition 0^{n} = +∞ obtained above for negative n problematic when n is odd, since in this case x^{n} → +∞ as x tends to 0 through positive values, but not negative ones.

== Efficient computation with integer exponents ==
Computing b^{n} using iterated multiplication requires n − 1 multiplication operations, but it can be computed more efficiently than that, as illustrated by the following example. To compute 2^{100}, apply Horner's rule to the exponent 100 written in binary:
$$100 = 2^2 +2^5 + 2^6 = 2^2(1+2^3(1+2)).$$
Then compute the following terms in order, reading Horner's rule from right to left.

2^{2} = 4
2 (2^{2}) = 2^{3} = 8
(2^{3})^{2} = 2^{6} = 64
(2^{6})^{2} = 2^{12} = 4096
(2^{12})^{2} = 2^{24} = 16777216
2 (2^{24}) = 2^{25} = 33554432
(2^{25})^{2} = 2^{50} = 1125899906842624
(2^{50})^{2} = 2^{100} = 1267650600228229401496703205376

This series of steps only requires 8 multiplications instead of 99.

In general, the number of multiplication operations required to compute b^{n} can be reduced to $\sharp n +\lfloor \log_{2} n\rfloor -1,$ by using exponentiation by squaring, where $\sharp n$ denotes the number of 1s in the binary representation of n. For some exponents (100 is not among them), the number of multiplications can be further reduced by computing and using the minimal addition-chain exponentiation. Finding the minimal sequence of multiplications (the minimal-length addition chain for the exponent) for b^{n} is a difficult problem, for which no efficient algorithms are currently known (see Subset sum problem), but many reasonably efficient heuristic algorithms are available. However, in practical computations, exponentiation by squaring is efficient enough, and much easier to implement.

== Iterated functions ==
Function composition is a binary operation that is defined on functions such that the codomain of the function written on the right is included in the domain of the function written on the left. It is denoted $g\circ f,$ and defined as
$$(g\circ f)(x)=g(f(x))$$
for every x in the domain of f.

If the domain of a function f equals its codomain, one may compose the function with itself an arbitrary number of time, and this defines the nth power of the function under composition, commonly called the nth iterate of the function. Thus $f^n$ denotes generally the nth iterate of f; for example, $f^3(x)$ means $f(f(f(x))).$

When a multiplication is defined on the codomain of the function, this defines a multiplication on functions, the pointwise multiplication, which induces another exponentiation. When using functional notation, the two kinds of exponentiation are generally distinguished by placing the exponent of the functional iteration before the parentheses enclosing the arguments of the function, and placing the exponent of pointwise multiplication after the parentheses. Thus $f^2(x)= f(f(x)),$ and $f(x)^2= f(x)\cdot f(x).$ When functional notation is not used, disambiguation is often done by placing the composition symbol before the exponent; for example $f^{\circ 3}=f\circ f \circ f,$ and $f^3=f\cdot f\cdot f.$ For historical reasons, the exponent of a repeated multiplication is placed before the argument for some specific functions, typically the trigonometric functions. So, $\sin^2 x$ and $\sin^2(x)$ both mean $\sin(x)\cdot\sin(x)$ and not $\sin(\sin(x))$. Historically, several variants of these notations were used by different authors.

In this context, the exponent $-1$ denotes always the inverse function, if it exists. So $\sin^{-1}x=\sin^{-1}(x) = \arcsin x.$ For the multiplicative inverse fractions are generally used as in $1/\sin(x)=\frac 1{\sin x}.$

== In programming languages ==
Programming languages generally express exponentiation either as an infix operator or as a function application, as they do not support superscripts. The most common operator symbol for exponentiation is the caret (^). The original version of ASCII included an uparrow symbol (↑), intended for exponentiation, but this was replaced by the caret in 1967, so the caret became usual in programming languages. The notations include:

- x ^ y: AWK, BASIC, J, Julia, MATLAB, Wolfram Language (Mathematica), R, Microsoft Excel, Analytica, TeX (and its derivatives), TI-BASIC, bc (for integer exponents), Haskell (for nonnegative integer exponents), Lua, and most computer algebra systems.
- x ** y. The Fortran character set did not include lowercase characters or punctuation symbols other than +-*/()&=.,' and so used ** for exponentiation (the initial version used a xx b instead.). Many other languages followed suit: Ada, Z shell, KornShell, Bash, COBOL, CoffeeScript, Fortran, FoxPro, Gnuplot, Groovy, JavaScript, OCaml, Object REXX (ooRexx), F#, Perl, PHP, PL/I, Python, Rexx, Ruby, SAS, Tcl, ABAP, Mercury, Haskell (for floating-point exponents), Turing, and VHDL.
- x ↑ y: ALGOL (reference language standard), Commodore BASIC, TRS-80 Level II/III BASIC.
- x ^^ y: Haskell (for fractional base, integer exponents), D.
- x⋆y: APL.

In most programming languages with an infix exponentiation operator, it is right-associative, that is, a^b^c is interpreted as a^(b^c). This is because (a^b)^c is equal to a^(b*c) and thus not as useful. In some languages, it is left-associative, notably in ALGOL, MATLAB, and the Microsoft Excel formula language.

Other programming languages use functional programming notation:

- (expt x y): Common Lisp.
- pown x y: F# (for integer base, integer exponent).

Still others only provide exponentiation as part of standard libraries:

- pow(x, y): C, C++ (in math library).
- Math.Pow(x, y): C#.
- math:pow(X, Y): Erlang.
- Math.pow(x, y): Java.
- [Math]::Pow(x, y): PowerShell.

In some statically typed languages that prioritize type safety such as Rust, exponentiation is performed via a multitude of methods:

- x.pow(y) for x and y as integers
- x.powf(y) for x and y as floating-point numbers
- x.powi(y) for x as a float and y as an integer

== History ==
The term exponent originates from the Latin exponentem, the present participle of exponere, meaning "to put forth". The term power (Latin: potentia, potestas, dignitas) is a mistranslation of the ancient Greek δύναμις (dúnamis, here: "amplification") used by the Greek mathematician Euclid for the square of a line, following Hippocrates of Chios.

In The Sand Reckoner, Archimedes proved the law of exponents, 10^{a} · 10^{b} = 10^{a+b}, necessary to manipulate powers of 10. He then used powers of 10 to estimate the number of grains of sand that can be contained in the universe.

In the 9th century, the Persian mathematician Al-Khwarizmi used the terms مَال (māl, "possessions", "property") for a square—the Muslims, "like most mathematicians of those and earlier times, thought of a squared number as a depiction of an area, especially of land, hence property"—and كَعْبَة (Kaʿbah, "cube") for a cube, which later Islamic mathematicians represented in mathematical notation as the letters mīm (m) and kāf (k), respectively, by the 15th century, as seen in the work of Abu'l-Hasan ibn Ali al-Qalasadi.

Nicolas Chuquet used a form of exponential notation in the 15th century, for example 12^{2} to represent 12x^{2}. This was later used by Henricus Grammateus and Michael Stifel in the 16th century. In the late 16th century, Jost Bürgi would use Roman numerals for exponents in a way similar to that of Chuquet, for example for 4x^{3}.

The word exponent was coined in 1544 by Michael Stifel. In the 16th century, Robert Recorde used the terms "square", "cube", "zenzizenzic" (fourth power), "sursolid" (fifth), "zenzicube" (sixth), "second sursolid" (seventh), and "zenzizenzizenzic" (eighth). "Biquadrate" has been used to refer to the fourth power as well.

In 1636, James Hume used in essence modern notation, when in L'algèbre de Viète he wrote A^{iii} for A^{3}. Early in the 17th century, the first form of our modern exponential notation was introduced by René Descartes in his text titled La Géométrie; there, the notation is introduced in Book I:

I designate ... aa, or a^{2} in multiplying a by itself; and a^{3} in multiplying it once more again by a, and thus to infinity.

Some mathematicians (such as Descartes) used exponents only for powers greater than two, preferring to represent squares as repeated multiplication. Thus they would write polynomials, for example, as ax + bxx + cx^{3} + d.

Samuel Jeake introduced the term indices in 1696. The term involution was used synonymously with the term indices, but had declined in usage and should not be confused with its more common meaning.

In 1748, Leonhard Euler introduced variable exponents, and, implicitly, non-integer exponents by writing:

Consider exponentials or powers in which the exponent itself is a variable. It is clear that quantities of this kind are not algebraic functions, since in those the exponents must be constant.

As calculation was mechanized, notation was adapted to numerical capacity by conventions in exponential notation. The theoretical concept of floating-point representation was originally introduced by Spanish engineer Leonardo Torres Quevedo in his 1914 Essays on Automatics. Later, in 1938, German engineer Konrad Zuse achieved its first physical implementation in his Z1 computer. In Zuse's design, one register contained the representation of leading digits, and a second contained the representation of the exponent. The more flexible decimal floating-point representation was introduced in 1946 with a Bell Laboratories computer. Eventually educators and engineers adopted scientific notation of numbers, consistent with common reference to order of magnitude in a ratio scale.

For instance, in 1961 the School Mathematics Study Group developed the notation in connection with units used in the metric system.

== See also ==
- Double exponential function – Exponential function of an exponential function
- Exponential decay – Decrease in value at a rate proportional to the current value
- Exponential field – Mathematical field with an extra operation
- Exponential growth – Growth of quantities at rate proportional to the current amount
- List of exponential topics
- Modular exponentiation – Exponentation in modular arithmetic
- Unicode subscripts and superscripts – Unicode denominator & numerator glyphs
- x^{y} = y^{x} – Exponential function
