= Inequation =

Mathematical statement that two values are not equal

In mathematics, an inequation is a statement relating two values, that is either a strict inequality ("greater than", <, or "less than", >) or a relation "not equal to" (≠). It is usually written in the form of a pair of expressions denoting the values in question, with a relational sign between the two sides, indicating the specific inequality relation. Some examples of inequations are:

- $a < b$
- $x+y+z < 1$
- $n > 1$
- $x \neq 0$

Sometimes, the term "inequation" is restricted to the relation "not equal to", or is enlarged for including the relations "less than or equal to", ≤, and "greater than or equal to", ≥.

== Chains of inequations ==
A shorthand notation is used for the conjunction of several inequations involving common expressions, by chaining them together. For example, the chain

$$0 \leq a < b \leq 1$$

is shorthand for

$$0 \leq a ~ ~ \mathrm{and} ~ ~ a < b ~ ~ \mathrm{and} ~ ~ b \leq 1$$

which also implies that $0 < b$ and $a < 1$.

In rare cases, chains without such implications about distant terms are used. For example $i \neq 0 \neq j$ is shorthand for $i \neq 0 ~ ~ \mathrm{and} ~ ~ 0 \neq j$, which does not imply $i \neq j.$ Similarly, $a < b > c$ is shorthand for $a < b ~ ~ \mathrm{and} ~ ~ b > c$, which does not imply any order of $a$ and $c$.

== Solving inequations ==
Solution set (portrayed as feasible region) for a sample list of inequations

Similar to equation solving, inequation solving means finding what values (numbers, functions, sets, etc.) fulfill a condition stated in the form of an inequation or a conjunction of several inequations. These expressions contain one or more unknowns, which are free variables for which values are sought that cause the condition to be fulfilled. To be precise, what is sought are often not necessarily actual values, but, more in general, expressions. A solution of the inequation is an assignment of expressions to the unknowns that satisfies the inequation(s); in other words, expressions such that, when they are substituted for the unknowns, make the inequations true propositions. Often, an additional objective expression (i.e., an optimization equation) is given, that is to be minimized or maximized by an optimal solution.

For example,

$$0 \leq x_1 \leq 690 - 1.5 \cdot x_2 \;\land\; 0 \leq x_2 \leq 530 - x_1 \;\land\; x_1 \leq 640 - 0.75 \cdot x_2$$

is a conjunction of inequations, partly written as chains (where $\land$ can be read as "and"); the set of its solutions is shown in blue in the picture (the red, green, and orange line corresponding to the 1st, 2nd, and 3rd conjunct, respectively). For a larger example. see Linear programming#Example.

Computer support in solving inequations is described in constraint programming; in particular, the simplex algorithm finds optimal solutions of linear inequations. The programming language Prolog III also supports solving algorithms for particular classes of inequalities (and other relations) as a basic language feature. For more, see constraint logic programming.

== Combinations of meanings ==
Usually because of the properties of certain functions (like square roots), some inequations are equivalent to a combination of multiple others. For example, the inequation $\textstyle \sqrt{{f(x)}} < g(x)$ is logically equivalent to the following three inequations combined:

1. $f(x) \ge 0$
2. $g(x) > 0$
3. $f(x) < \left(g(x)\right)^2$

== See also ==
- Apartness relation — a form of inequality in constructive mathematics
- Equation
- Equals sign
- Inequality (mathematics)
- Relational operator
