= Fifth power (algebra) =

Result of multiplying five instances of a number together

In arithmetic and algebra, the fifth power or sursolid of a number n is the result of multiplying five instances of n together:

n^{5} = n × n × n × n × n.

Fifth powers are also formed by multiplying a number by its fourth power, or the square of a number by its cube.

The sequence of fifth powers of integers is:

0, 1, 32, 243, 1024, 3125, 7776, 16807, 32768, 59049, 100000, 161051, 248832, 371293, 537824, 759375, 1048576, 1419857, 1889568, 2476099, 3200000, 4084101, 5153632, 6436343, 7962624, 9765625, ... (sequence A000584 in the OEIS)

== Properties ==
For any integer n, the last decimal digit of n^{5} is the same as the last (decimal) digit of n, i.e.

$$n \equiv n^5\pmod {10}$$

By the Abel–Ruffini theorem, there is no general algebraic formula (formula expressed in terms of radical expressions) for the solution of polynomial equations containing a fifth power of the unknown as their highest power. This is the lowest power for which this is true. See quintic equation, sextic equation, and septic equation.

Along with the fourth power, the fifth power is one of two powers k that can be expressed as the sum of k − 1 other k-th powers, providing counterexamples to Euler's sum of powers conjecture. Specifically,

27^{5} + 84^{5} + 110^{5} + 133^{5} = 144^{5} (Lander & Parkin, 1966)

== See also ==
- Eighth power
- Seventh power
- Sixth power
- Fourth power
- Cube (algebra)
- Square (algebra)
- Perfect power
