= Seventh power =

Result of multiplying seven instances of a number

In arithmetic and algebra, the seventh power of a number n is the result of multiplying seven instances of n together. So:

n^{7} = n × n × n × n × n × n × n.

Seventh powers are also formed by multiplying a number by its sixth power, the square of a number by its fifth power, or the cube of a number by its fourth power.

The sequence of seventh powers of integers is:

0, 1, 128, 2187, 16384, 78125, 279936, 823543, 2097152, 4782969, 10000000, 19487171, 35831808, 62748517, 105413504, 170859375, 268435456, 410338673, 612220032, 893871739, 1280000000, 1801088541, 2494357888, 3404825447, 4586471424, 6103515625, 8031810176, ... (sequence A001015 in the OEIS)

In the archaic notation of Robert Recorde, the seventh power of a number was called the "second sursolid".

== Properties ==
Leonard Eugene Dickson studied generalizations of Waring's problem for seventh powers, showing that every non-negative integer can be represented as a sum of at most 258 non-negative seventh powers (1^{7} is 1, and 2^{7} is 128). All but finitely many positive integers can be expressed more simply as the sum of at most 46 seventh powers. If powers of negative integers are allowed, only 12 powers are required.

The smallest number that can be represented in two different ways as a sum of four positive seventh powers is 2056364173794800.

The smallest seventh power that can be represented as a sum of eight distinct seventh powers is:

$$102^7=12^7+35^7+53^7+58^7+64^7+83^7+85^7+90^7.$$

The two known examples of a seventh power expressible as the sum of seven seventh powers are

$568^7 = 127^7+ 258^7 + 266^7 + 413^7 + 430^7 + 439^7 + 525^7$ (M. Dodrill, 1999);

and

$626^7 = 625^7+309^7+258^7+255^7+158^7+148^7+91^7$ (Maurice Blondot, 11/14/2000);

Any example with fewer terms in the sum would be a counterexample to Euler's sum of powers conjecture, which is currently only known to be false for the powers 4 and 5.

== See also ==
- Eighth power
- Sixth power
- Fifth power (algebra)
- Fourth power
- Cube (algebra)
- Square (algebra)
