= Fourth power =

Result of multiplying four instances of a number together

In arithmetic and algebra, the fourth power of a number n is the result of multiplying four instances of n together: n^{4} = n × n × n × n.

Fourth powers are also formed by multiplying a number by its cube. Furthermore, they are squares of squares.

Some people refer to n^{4} as n tesseracted, hypercubed, zenzizenzic, biquadrate or supercubed instead of "to the power of 4".

The sequence of fourth powers of integers, known as biquadrates or tesseractic numbers, is:

0, 1, 16, 81, 256, 625, 1296, 2401, 4096, 6561, 10000, 14641, 20736, 28561, 38416, 50625, 65536, 83521, 104976, 130321, 160000, 194481, 234256, 279841, 331776, 390625, 456976, 531441, 614656, 707281, 810000, ... (sequence A000583 in the OEIS).

== Properties ==
The last digit of a fourth power in decimal can only be 0, 1, 5, or 6.

In hexadecimal the last nonzero digit of a fourth power is always 1.

Every positive integer can be expressed as the sum of at most 19 fourth powers; every integer larger than 13792 can be expressed as the sum of at most 16 fourth powers (see Waring's problem).

Fermat knew that a fourth power cannot be the sum of two other fourth powers (the n = 4 case of Fermat's Last Theorem; see Fermat's right triangle theorem). Euler conjectured that a fourth power cannot be written as the sum of three fourth powers, but 200 years later, in 1986, this was disproven by Elkies with:

20615673^{4} = 18796760^{4} + 15365639^{4} + 2682440^{4}.

Elkies showed that there are infinitely many other counterexamples for exponent four, some of which are:

2813001^{4} = 2767624^{4} + 1390400^{4} + 673865^{4} (Allan MacLeod)
8707481^{4} = 8332208^{4} + 5507880^{4} + 1705575^{4} (D.J. Bernstein)
12197457^{4} = 11289040^{4} + 8282543^{4} + 5870000^{4} (D.J. Bernstein)
16003017^{4} = 14173720^{4} + 12552200^{4} + 4479031^{4} (D.J. Bernstein)
16430513^{4} = 16281009^{4} + 7028600^{4} + 3642840^{4} (D.J. Bernstein)
422481^{4} = 414560^{4} + 217519^{4} + 95800^{4} (Roger Frye, 1988)
638523249^{4} = 630662624^{4} + 275156240^{4} + 219076465^{4} (Allan MacLeod, 1998)

Fourth-degree equations, which contain a fourth degree (but no higher) polynomial are, by the Abel–Ruffini theorem, the highest degree equations having a general solution using radicals.

== See also ==
- Square (algebra)
- Cube (algebra)
- Exponentiation
- Fifth power (algebra)
- Sixth power
- Seventh power
- Eighth power
- Perfect power
