= Eighth power =

Result of multiplying eight instances of a number together

In arithmetic and algebra, the eighth power of a number n is the result of multiplying eight instances of n together. So:

n^{8} = n × n × n × n × n × n × n × n.

Eighth powers are also formed by multiplying a number by its seventh power, or the fourth power of a number by itself.

The sequence of eighth powers of integer is:

0, 1, 256, 6561, 65536, 390625, 1679616, 5764801, 16777216, 43046721, 100000000, 214358881, 429981696, 815730721, 1475789056, 2562890625, 4294967296, 6975757441, 11019960576, 16983563041, 25600000000, 37822859361, 54875873536, 78310985281, 110075314176, 152587890625 ... (sequence A001016 in the OEIS)

In the archaic notation of Robert Recorde, the eighth power of a number was called the "zenzizenzizenzic".

== Algebra and number theory ==
Polynomial equations of degree 8 are octic equations. These have the form

$$ax^8+bx^7+cx^6+dx^5+ex^4+fx^3+gx^2+hx+k=0.\,$$

The smallest known eighth power that can be written as a sum of eight eighth powers is

$$1409^8 = 1324^8 + 1190^8 + 1088^8 + 748^8 + 524^8 + 478^8 + 223^8 + 90^8.$$

The sum of the reciprocals of the nonzero eighth powers is the Riemann zeta function evaluated at 8, which can be expressed in terms of the eighth power of pi:

$\zeta(8) = \frac{1}{1^8} + \frac{1}{2^8} + \frac{1}{3^8} + \cdots = \frac{\pi^8}{9450} = 1.00407 \dots$ (OEIS: A013666)

This is an example of a more general expression for evaluating the Riemann zeta function at positive even integers, in terms of the Bernoulli numbers:

$$\zeta(2n) = (-1)^{n+1}\frac{B_{2n}(2\pi)^{2n}}{2(2n)!}.$$

== Physics ==
In aeroacoustics, Lighthill's eighth power law states that the power of the sound created by a turbulent motion, far from the turbulence, is proportional to the eighth power of the characteristic turbulent velocity.

The ordered phase of the two-dimensional Ising model exhibits an inverse eighth power dependence of the order parameter upon the reduced temperature.

The Casimir–Polder force between two molecules decays as the inverse eighth power of the distance between them.

== See also ==
- Seventh power
- Sixth power
- Fifth power
- Fourth power
- Cube
- Square number
