= Sixth power =

Result of multiplying six instances of a number

64 (2^{6}) and 729 (3^{6}) cubelets arranged as cubes ((2^{2})^{3} and (3^{2})^{3}, respectively) and as squares ((2^{3})^{2} and (3^{3})^{2}, respectively)

In arithmetic and algebra the sixth power of a number n is the result of multiplying six instances of n together. So:

n^{6} = n × n × n × n × n × n.

Sixth powers can be formed by multiplying a number by its fifth power, multiplying the square of a number by its fourth power, by cubing a square, or by squaring a cube.

The sequence of sixth powers of integers are:

0, 1, 64, 729, 4096, 15625, 46656, 117649, 262144, 531441, 1000000, 1771561, 2985984, 4826809, 7529536, 11390625, 16777216, 24137569, 34012224, 47045881, 64000000, 85766121, 113379904, 148035889, 191102976, 244140625, 308915776, 387420489, 481890304, ... (sequence A001014 in the OEIS)

They include the significant decimal numbers 10^{6} (a million), 100^{6} (a short-scale trillion and long-scale billion), 1000^{6} (a quintillion and a long-scale trillion) and so on.

== Squares and cubes ==
The sixth powers of integers can be characterized as the numbers that are simultaneously squares and cubes. In this way, they are analogous to two other classes of figurate numbers: the square triangular numbers, which are simultaneously square and triangular, and the solutions to the cannonball problem, which are simultaneously square and square-pyramidal.

Because of their connection to squares and cubes, sixth powers play an important role in the study of the Mordell curves, which are elliptic curves of the form

$$y^2=x^3+k.$$

When $k$ is divisible by a sixth power, this equation can be reduced by dividing by that power to give a simpler equation of the same form. A well-known result in number theory, proven by Rudolf Fueter and Louis J. Mordell, states that, when $k$ is an integer that is not divisible by a sixth power (other than the exceptional cases $k=1$ and $k=-432$), this equation either has no rational solutions with both $x$ and $y$ nonzero or infinitely many of them.

In the archaic notation of Robert Recorde, the sixth power of a number was called the "zenzicube", meaning the square of a cube. Similarly, the notation for sixth powers used in 12th century Indian mathematics by Bhāskara II also called them either the square of a cube or the cube of a square.

== Sums ==
There are numerous known examples of sixth powers that can be expressed as the sum of seven other sixth powers, but no examples are yet known of a sixth power expressible as the sum of just six sixth powers. This makes it unique among the powers with exponent k = 1, 2, ... , 8, the others of which can each be expressed as the sum of k other k-th powers, and some of which (in violation of Euler's sum of powers conjecture) can be expressed as a sum of even fewer k-th powers.

In connection with Waring's problem, every sufficiently large integer can be represented as a sum of at most 24 sixth powers of integers.

There are infinitely many different nontrivial solutions to the Diophantine equation

$$a^6+b^6+c^6=d^6+e^6+f^6.$$

It has not been proven whether the equation

$$a^6+b^6=c^6+d^6$$

has a nontrivial solution, but the Lander, Parkin, and Selfridge conjecture would imply that it does not.

== Other properties ==
- $n^6-1$ is divisible by 7 if n is not divisible by 7.

== See also ==
- Sextic equation
- Eighth power
- Seventh power
- Fifth power (algebra)
- Fourth power
- Cube (algebra)
- Square (algebra)
