= Table of mathematical symbols by introduction date =

The following table lists many specialized symbols commonly used in modern mathematics, ordered by their introduction date.

Symbol	Name	Date of earliest use	First author to use	Notes
—	horizontal bar for division	c. 14th century	Nicole Oresme	
+	plus sign	c. 1360	Nicole Oresme	From a ligature of Latin et.
−	minus sign	1489	Johannes Widmann	Appears in work that includes the first use of the plus sign in print.
√	radical symbol (for square root)	1525	Christoff Rudolff	Without the vinculum above the radicand.
(...)	parentheses (for precedence grouping)	1544	Michael Stifel	In handwritten notes.
(...)	parentheses (for precedence grouping)	1556	Nicolo Tartaglia	
=	equals sign	1557	Robert Recorde	
.	decimal separator	1593	Christopher Clavius	
×	multiplication sign	1618	William Oughtred	
±	plus–minus sign	1628	William Oughtred	
∷	proportion sign	1628	William Oughtred	
^{n}√	radical symbol (for nth root)	1629	Albert Girard	
< >	strict inequality signs (less-than sign and greater-than sign)	1631	Thomas Harriot	
x^{y}	superscript notation (for exponentiation)	1636	James Hume	Using Roman numerals as superscripts.
x^{y}	superscript notation (for exponentiation)	1637	René Descartes	In La Géométrie. In the modern form.
x	Use of the letter x for an independent variable or unknown value.	1637	René Descartes	In La Géométrie.
√ ̅	radical symbol (for square root)	1637	René Descartes	In La Géométrie. With the vinculum above the radicand.
%	percent sign	c. 1650	unknown	
∞	infinity sign	1655	John Wallis	
÷	division sign	1659	Johann Rahn or John Pell	Originated as a repurposed obelus variant.
∴	therefore sign	1659	Johann Rahn or John Pell	
≤ ≥	unstrict inequality signs (less-than or equals to sign and greater-than or equals to sign)	1670	John Wallis	With the horizontal bar above the inequality sign.
≤ ≥	unstrict inequality signs (less-than or equals to sign and greater-than or equals to sign)	1734	Pierre Bouguer	With double horizontal bar below the inequality sign.
d	differential sign	1675	Gottfried Leibniz	
∫	integral sign	1675	Gottfried Leibniz	
:	colon (for division)	1684	Gottfried Leibniz	Derives from the use of the colon to denote fractions, dating back to 1633.
·	middle dot (for multiplication)	1698	Gottfried Leibniz	Perhaps derives from a much earlier use of the middle dot to separate juxtaposed numbers.
π	pi (ratio of a circle's circumference to its diameter)	1706	William Jones	Believed to have been used because p (π) is the first letter in perimetron (perimeter).
/	division slash (a.k.a. solidus)	1718	Thomas Twining	Derives from the horizontal fraction bar.
e	e (the base of the natural logarithm)	1727–1728	Leonhard Euler	Unpublished. First published appearance was in Euler's Mechanica (1736).
≠	inequality sign (not equal to)	unknown	Leonhard Euler	
x′	prime symbol (for derivative)	1748	Leonhard Euler	
Σ	summation symbol	1755	Leonhard Euler	
∝	proportionality sign	1768	William Emerson	
∂	partial differential sign	1770	Marquis de Condorcet	
i	imaginary number	1777	Leonhard Euler	Used in a memoir. First publisher by Euler in 1794 in his Institutionum calculi integralis.
≡	identity sign (for congruence relation)	1801	Carl Friedrich Gauss	First appearance in print, used previously in personal writings of Gauss.
[x]	integral part (a.k.a. floor)	1808	Carl Friedrich Gauss	
!	factorial	1808	Christian Kramp	
Π	product symbol	1812	Carl Friedrich Gauss	
⊂ ⊃	set inclusion signs (subset of, superset of)	1817	Joseph Gergonne	
⊂ ⊃	set inclusion signs (subset of, superset of)	1890	Ernst Schröder	
|...|	absolute value notation	1841	Karl Weierstrass	
|...|	determinant of a matrix	1841	Arthur Cayley	
‖...‖	matrix notation	1843	Arthur Cayley	
∇	nabla symbol (for vector differential)	1846	William Rowan Hamilton	Previously used by Hamilton as a general-purpose operator sign.
∩ ∪	intersection and union signs	1888	Giuseppe Peano	
ℵ	aleph symbol (for transfinite cardinal numbers)	1893	Georg Cantor	
∈	membership sign (is an element of)	1894	Giuseppe Peano	
O	Big O Notation	1894	Paul Bachmann	
{...}	curly brackets or braces (for set notation)	1895	Georg Cantor	
$\mathbb{N}$	Blackboard bold capital N (for natural numbers set)	1895	Giuseppe Peano	
$\mathbb{Q}$	Blackboard bold capital Q (for rational numbers set)	1895	Giuseppe Peano	
∃	existential quantifier (there exists)	1897	Giuseppe Peano	
·	middle dot (for dot product)	1902	J. Willard Gibbs	
×	multiplication sign (for cross product)	1902	J. Willard Gibbs	
∨	logical disjunction (a.k.a. OR)	1906	Bertrand Russell	
(...) [...]	matrix notation	1909	Maxime Bôcher	
(...) [...]	matrix notation	1909	Gerhard Kowalewski	
∮	contour integral sign	1917	Arnold Sommerfeld	
$\mathbb{Z}$	Blackboard bold capital Z (for integer numbers set)	1930	Edmund Landau	
∀	universal quantifier (for all)	1935	Gerhard Gentzen	
→	arrow (for function notation)	1936	Øystein Ore	To denote images of specific elements.
→	arrow (for function notation)	1940	Witold Hurewicz	In the present form of f: X → Y.
∅	empty set sign	1939	André Weil (Nicolas Bourbaki)	
$\mathbb{C}$	Blackboard bold capital C (for complex numbers set)	1939	Nathan Jacobson	
∎	end of proof sign (a.k.a. tombstone)	1950	Paul Halmos	
⌊x⌋ ⌈x⌉	greatest integer ≤ x (a.k.a. floor) smallest integer ≥ x (a.k.a. ceiling)	1962	Kenneth E. Iverson	

== See also ==
- History of mathematical notation
- History of the Hindu–Arabic numeral system
- Glossary of mathematical symbols
- List of mathematical symbols by subject
- Mathematical notation
- Mathematical operators and symbols in Unicode
