= History of mathematical notation =

Origin and evolution of the symbols used to write equations and formulas

The history of mathematical notation covers the introduction, development, and cultural diffusion of mathematical symbols and the conflicts between notational methods that arise during a notation's move to popularity or obsolescence. Mathematical notation comprises the symbols used to write mathematical equations and formulas. Notation generally implies a set of well-defined representations of quantities and symbols operators. The history includes Hindu–Arabic numerals, letters from the Roman, Greek, Hebrew, and German alphabets, and a variety of symbols invented by mathematicians over the past several centuries.

The historical development of mathematical notation can be divided into three stages:

- Rhetorical stage—where calculations are performed by words and tallies, and no symbols are used.
- Syncopated stage—where frequently used operations and quantities are represented by symbolic syntactical abbreviations, such as letters or numerals. During antiquity and the medieval periods, bursts of mathematical creativity were often followed by centuries of stagnation. As the early modern age opened and the worldwide spread of knowledge began, written examples of mathematical developments came to light.
- Symbolic stage—where comprehensive systems of notation supersede rhetoric. The increasing pace of new mathematical developments, interacting with new scientific discoveries, led to a robust and complete usage of symbols. This began with mathematicians of medieval India and mid-16th century Europe, and continues through the present day.

The more general area of study known as the history of mathematics primarily investigates the origins of discoveries in mathematics. The specific focus of this article is the investigation of mathematical methods and notations of the past.

== Rhetorical stage ==
Many areas of mathematics began with the study of real world problems, before the underlying rules and concepts were identified and defined as abstract structures. For example, geometry has its origins in the calculation of distances and areas in the real world; algebra started with methods of solving problems in arithmetic. The earliest mathematical notations emerged from these problems.

There can be no doubt that most early peoples who left records knew something of numeration and mechanics and that a few were also acquainted with the elements of land-surveying. In particular, the ancient Egyptians paid attention to geometry and numbers, and the ancient Phoenicians performed practical arithmetic, book-keeping, navigation, and land-surveying. The results attained by these people seem to have been accessible (under certain conditions) to travelers, facilitating dispersal of the methods. It is probable that the knowledge of the Egyptians and Phoenicians was largely the result of observation and measurement, and represented the accumulated experience of many ages. Subsequent studies of mathematics by the Greeks were largely indebted to these previous investigations.

=== Beginning of notation ===
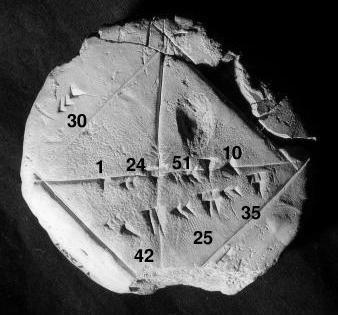
Babylonian tablet (c. 1800–1600 BCE), showing an approximation of √2 (1 24 51 10 in sexagesimal) in the context of the Pythagorean theorem for an isosceles triangle.

Written mathematics began with numbers expressed as tally marks, with each tally representing a single unit. Numerical symbols consisted probably of strokes or notches cut in wood or stone, which were intelligible across cultures. For example, one notch in a bone represented one animal, person, or object. Numerical notation's distinctive feature—symbols having both local and intrinsic values—implies a state of civilization at the period of its invention.

The earliest evidence of written mathematics dates back to the ancient Sumerians and the system of metrology from 3000 BC. From around 2500 BC onwards, the Sumerians wrote multiplication tables on clay tablets and dealt with geometrical exercises and division problems. The earliest traces of Babylonian numerals also date back to this period. Babylonian mathematics has been reconstructed from more than 400 clay tablets unearthed since the 1850s. Written in cuneiform, these tablets were inscribed whilst the clay was soft and then baked hard in an oven or by the heat of the sun. Some of these appear to be graded homework.

The majority of Mesopotamian clay tablets date from 1800 to 1600 BC, and cover topics which include fractions, algebra, quadratic and cubic equations, and the calculation of regular numbers, reciprocals, and pairs. The tablets also include multiplication tables and methods for solving linear and quadratic equations. The Babylonian tablet YBC 7289 gives an approximation of √2 that is accurate to an equivalent of six decimal places.

Babylonian mathematics were written using a sexagesimal (base-60) numeral system. From this derives the modern-day usage of 60 seconds in a minute, 60 minutes in an hour, and 360 (60 × 6) degrees in a circle, as well as the use of minutes and seconds of arc to denote fractions of a degree. Babylonian advances in mathematics were facilitated by the fact that 60 has many divisors: the reciprocal of any integer which is a multiple of divisors of 60 has a finite expansion in base 60. (In decimal arithmetic, only reciprocals of multiples of 2 and 5 have finite decimal expansions.) Also, unlike the Egyptians, Greeks, and Romans, the Babylonians had a true place-value system, where digits written in the left column represented larger values, much as in the decimal system. They lacked, however, an equivalent of the decimal point, and so the place value of a symbol often had to be inferred from the context.

Initially, the Mesopotamians had symbols for each power of ten. Later, they wrote numbers in almost exactly the same way as in modern times. Instead of using unique symbols for each power of ten, they wrote only the coefficients of each power of ten, with each digit separated by only a space. By the time of Alexander the Great, they had created a symbol that represented zero and was a placeholder.

Rhetorical algebra was first developed by the ancient Babylonians and remained dominant up to the 16th century. In this system, equations are written in full sentences. For example, the rhetorical form of $x + 1 = 2$ is "The thing plus one equals two" or possibly "The thing plus 1 equals 2".

The ancient Egyptians numerated by hieroglyphics. Egyptian mathematics had symbols for one, ten, one hundred, one thousand, ten thousand, one hundred thousand, and one million. Smaller digits were placed on the left of the number, as they are in Hindu–Arabic numerals. Later, the Egyptians used hieratic instead of hieroglyphic script to show numbers. Hieratic was more like cursive and replaced several groups of symbols with individual ones. For example, the four vertical lines used to represent the number 'four' were replaced by a single horizontal line. This is found in the Rhind Mathematical Papyrus (c. 2000–1800 BC) and the Moscow Mathematical Papyrus (c. 1890 BC). The system the Egyptians used was discovered and modified by many other civilizations in the Mediterranean. The Egyptians also had symbols for basic operations: legs going forward represented addition, and legs walking backward to represent subtraction.

The peoples with whom the Greeks of Asia Minor (amongst whom notation in western history begins) were likely to have come into frequent contact were those inhabiting the eastern littoral of the Mediterranean; Greek tradition uniformly assigned the special development of geometry to the Egyptians, and the science of numbers to either the Egyptians or the Phoenicians.

== Syncopated stage ==
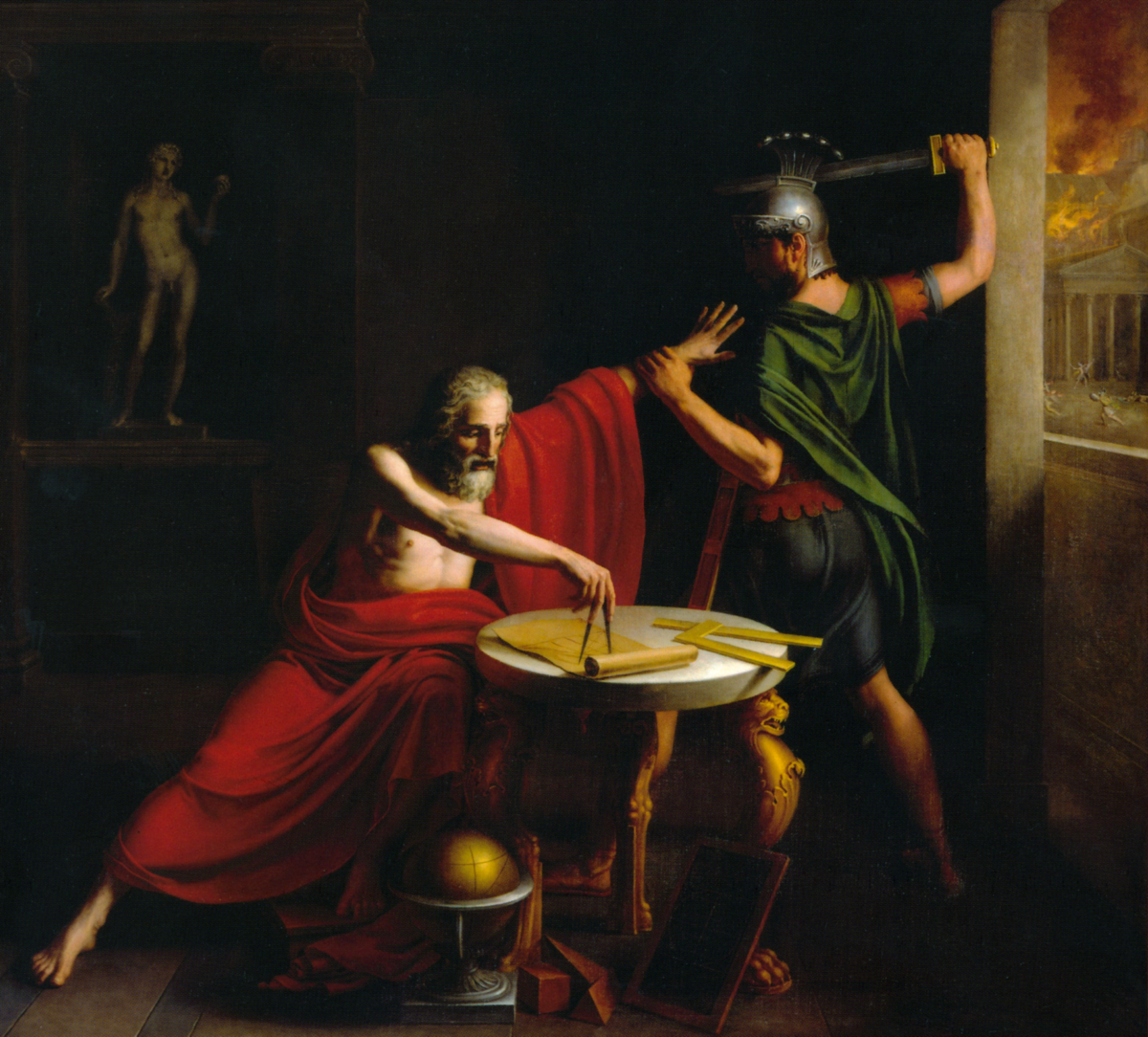
Death of Archimedes (1815) by Thomas Degeorge. The last words attributed to Archimedes are "Do not disturb my circles", a reference to the circles in the mathematical drawing that he was studying when disturbed by the Roman soldier.

The history of mathematics cannot with certainty be traced back to any school or period before that of the Ionian Greeks. Still, the subsequent history may be divided into periods, the distinctions between which are tolerably well-marked. Greek mathematics, which originated with the study of geometry, tended to be deductive and scientific from its commencement. Since the fourth century AD, Pythagoras has commonly been given credit for discovering the Pythagorean theorem, a theorem in geometry that states that in a right-angled triangle the area of the square on the hypotenuse (the side opposite the right angle) is equal to the sum of the areas of the squares of the other two sides. However, this geometric relationship appears in a few earlier ancient mathematical texts (albeit not as a formalized theorem), notably Plimpton 322, a Babylonian tablet of mathematics from around 1900 BC. The study of mathematics as a subject in its own right began in the 6th century BC with the Pythagoreans, who coined the term "mathematics" from the ancient Greek mathema (μάθημα), meaning "subject of instruction".

Plato's influence was especially strong in mathematics and the sciences. He helped to distinguish between pure and applied mathematics by widening the gap between "arithmetic" (now called number theory) and "logistic" (now called arithmetic). Greek mathematics greatly refined the methods (especially through the introduction of deductive reasoning and mathematical rigor in proofs) and expanded the subject matter of mathematics. Aristotle is credited with what later would be called the law of excluded middle.

Abstract or pure mathematics deals with concepts like magnitude and quantity without regard to any practical application or situation, and includes arithmetic and geometry. In contrast, in mixed or applied mathematics, mathematical properties and relationships are applied to real-world objects to model laws of physics, for example in hydrostatics, optics, and navigation.

Archimedes is generally considered to be the greatest mathematician of antiquity and one of the greatest of all time. He used the method of exhaustion to calculate the area under the arc of a parabola with the summation of an infinite series, and gave a remarkably accurate approximation of pi. He also defined the spiral bearing his name, formulae for the volumes of surfaces of revolution, and an ingenious system for expressing very large numbers.

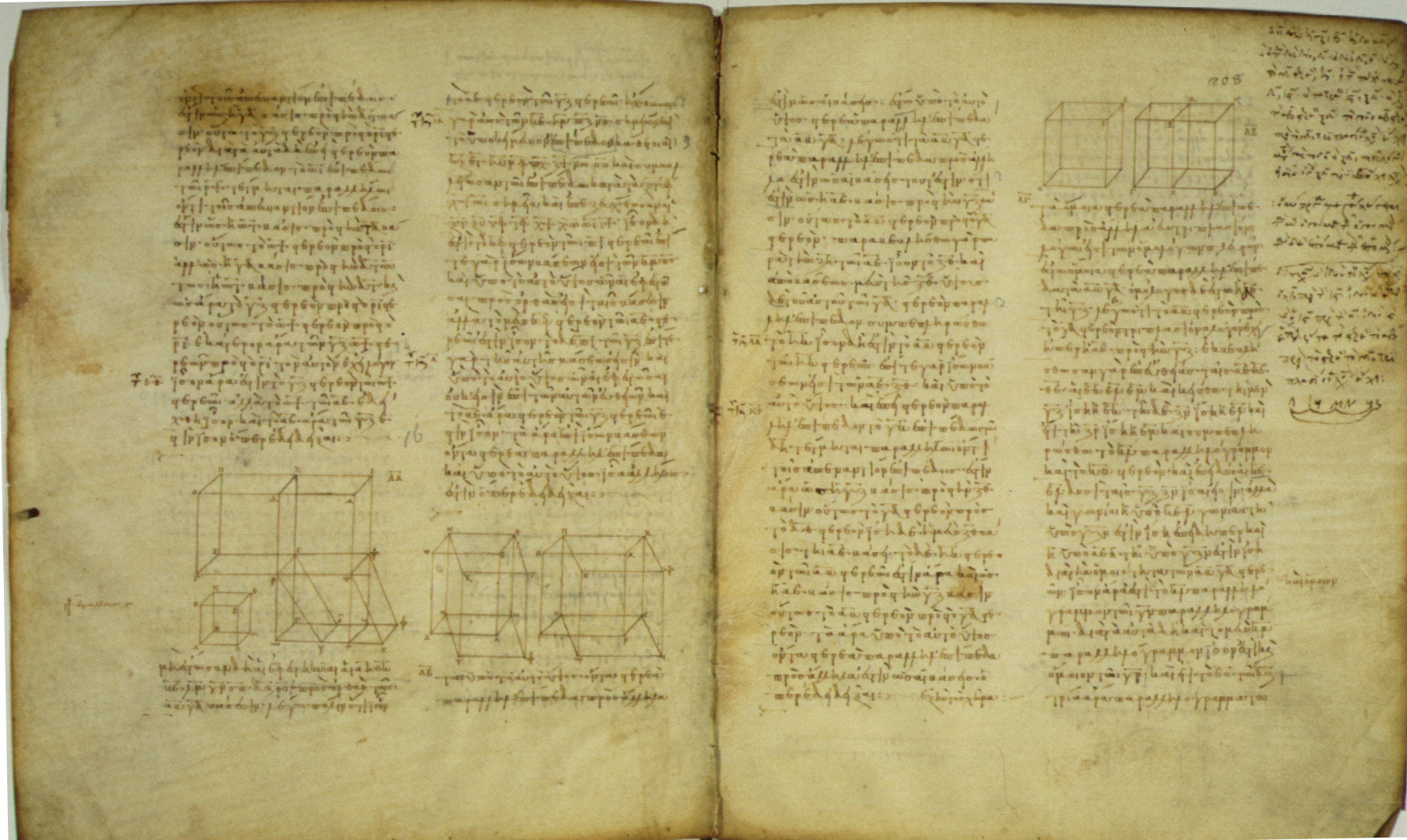
Propositions 31, 32, and 33 in the ninth book of Euclid's Elements (volume 2 of the manuscript, sheets 207–208 recto.)

The ancient Greeks made steps in the abstraction of geometry. Euclid's Elements (c. 300 BC) is the earliest extant documentation of the axioms of plane geometry—though Proclus tells of an earlier axiomatisation by Hippocrates of Chios —and is one of the oldest extant Greek mathematical treatises. Consisting of thirteen books, it collects theorems proven by other mathematicians, supplemented by some original work. The document is a successful collection of definitions, postulates (axioms), propositions (theorems and constructions), and mathematical proofs of the propositions, and covers topics such as Euclidean geometry, geometric algebra, elementary number theory, and the ancient Greek version of algebraic systems. The first theorem given in the text, Euclid's lemma, captures a fundamental property of prime numbers. The text was ubiquitous in the quadrivium and was instrumental in the development of logic, mathematics, and science. Autolycus' On the Moving Sphere is another ancient mathematical manuscript of the time.

The next phase of notation for algebra was syncopated algebra, in which some symbolism is used, but which does not contain all of the characteristics of symbolic algebra. For instance, there may be a restriction that subtraction may be used only once within one side of an equation, which is not the case with symbolic algebra. Syncopated algebraic expression first appeared in a series of books called Arithmetica, by Diophantus of Alexandria (3rd century AD; many lost), followed by Brahmagupta's Brāhmasphuṭasiddhānta (7th century).

=== Acrophonic and Milesian numeration ===
The ancient Greeks employed Attic numeration, which was based on the system of the Egyptians and was later adapted and used by the Romans. Greek numerals one through four were written as vertical lines, as in the hieroglyphics. The symbol for five was the Greek letter Π (pi), representing the Greek word for 'five' (pente). Numbers six through nine were written as a Π with vertical lines beside it. Ten was represented by the letter Δ (delta), from word for 'ten' (deka), one hundred by the letter from the word for hundred, and so on. This system was 'acrophonic' since it was based on the first sound of the numeral.

Milesian (Ionian) numeration was another Greek numeral system. It was constructed by partitioning the twenty-four letters of the Greek alphabet, plus three archaic letters, into three classes of nine letters each, and using them to represent the units, tens, and hundreds. (Jean Baptiste Joseph Delambre's Astronomie Ancienne, t. ii.)

| Α (α) | Β (β) | Г (γ) | Δ (δ) | Ε (ε) | Ϝ (ϝ) | Ζ (ζ) | Η (η) | θ (θ) | Ι (ι) | Κ (κ) | Λ (λ) | Μ (μ) | Ν (ν) | Ξ (ξ) | Ο (ο) | Π (π) | Ϟ (ϟ) | Ρ (ρ) | Σ (σ) | Τ (τ) | Υ (υ) | Φ (φ) | Χ (χ) | Ψ (ψ) | Ω (ω) | Ϡ (ϡ) |
| 1 | 2 | 3 | 4 | 5 | 6 | 7 | 8 | 9 | 10 | 20 | 30 | 40 | 50 | 60 | 70 | 80 | 90 | 100 | 200 | 300 | 400 | 500 | 600 | 700 | 800 | 900 |

This system appeared in the third century BC, before the letters digamma (Ϝ), koppa (Ϟ), and sampi (Ϡ) became obsolete. When lowercase letters became differentiated from uppercase letters, the lowercase letters were used as the symbols for notation. Multiples of one thousand were written as the nine numbers with a stroke in front of them: thus, one thousand was ",α", two thousand was ",β", etc. The letter M (for μύριοι, as in "myriad") was used to multiply numbers by ten thousand. For example, the number 88,888,888 would be written as M,ηωπη*ηωπη.

Milesian numeration, though far less convenient than modern numerals, was formed on a perfectly regular and scientific plan, and could be used with tolerable effect as an instrument of calculation, to which purpose the Roman system was totally inapplicable.

Greek mathematical reasoning was almost entirely geometric (albeit often used to reason about non-geometric subjects such as number theory), and hence the Greeks had no interest in algebraic symbols. An exception was the great algebraist Diophantus of Alexandria. His Arithmetica was one of the texts to use symbols in equations. It was not completely symbolic, but was much more so than previous books. In it, an unknown number was called s; the square of s was $\Delta^y$; the cube was $K^y$; the fourth power was $\Delta^y\Delta$; and the fifth power was $\Delta K^y$. So for example, the expression:

$$2x^4+3x^3-4x^2+5x-6$$

would be written as:

SS2 C3 x5 M S4 u6

=== Chinese mathematical notation ===
The numbers 0–9 in Chinese huama (花碼) numerals

The ancient Chinese used numerals that look much like the tally system. Numbers one through four were horizontal lines. Five was an X between two horizontal lines; it looked almost exactly the same as the Roman numeral for ten. Nowadays, this huama numeral system is only used for displaying prices in Chinese markets or on traditional handwritten invoices.

Mathematics in China emerged independently by the 11th century BC, but has much older roots. The ancient Chinese were acquainted with astronomical cycles, geometrical implements like the rule, compass, and plumb-bob, and machines like the wheel and axle. The Chinese independently developed very large and negative numbers, decimals, a place value decimal system, a binary system, algebra, geometry, and trigonometry. As in other early societies, the purpose of astronomy was to perfect the agricultural calendar and other practical tasks, not to establish a formal system; thus, the duties of the Chinese Board of Mathematics were confined to the annual preparation of the dates and predictions of the almanac.

Counting rod numerals

Early Chinese mathematical inventions include a place value system known as counting rods (which emerged during the Warring States period), certain geometrical theorems (such as the ratio of sides), and the suanpan (abacus) for performing arithmetic calculations. Mathematical results were expressed in writing. Ancient Chinese mathematicians did not develop an axiomatic approach, but made advances in algorithm development and algebra. Chinese algebra reached its zenith in the 13th century, when Zhu Shijie invented the method of four unknowns. Early China exemplifies how a civilization may possess considerable skill in the applied arts with only scarce understanding of the formal mathematics on which those arts are founded.

Due to linguistic and geographic barriers, as well as content, the mathematics of ancient China and the mathematics of the ancient Mediterranean world are presumed to have developed more or less independently. The final form of The Nine Chapters on the Mathematical Art and the Book on Numbers and Computation and Huainanzi are roughly contemporary with classical Greek mathematics. Some exchange of ideas across Asia through known cultural exchanges from at least Roman times is likely. Frequently, elements of the mathematics of early societies correspond to rudimentary results found later in branches of modern mathematics such as geometry or number theory. For example, the Pythagorean theorem was attested in the Zhoubi Suanjing, and knowledge of Pascal's triangle has also been shown to have existed in China centuries before Blaise Pascal, articulated by mathematicians like the polymath Shen Kuo.

The state of trigonometry advanced during the Song dynasty (960–1279), when Chinese mathematicians had greater need of spherical trigonometry in calendrical science and astronomical calculations. Shen Kuo used trigonometric functions to solve mathematical problems of chords and arcs. Shen's work on arc lengths provided the basis for spherical trigonometry developed in the 13th century by the mathematician and astronomer Guo Shoujing. As the historians L. Gauchet and Joseph Needham state, Guo Shoujing used spherical trigonometry in his calculations to improve the calendar system and Chinese astronomy. Chinese mathematics later incorporated the work and teaching of Arab missionaries with knowledge of spherical trigonometry who had come to China during the 13th century.

=== Indian and Arabic numerals and notation ===
The Hindu–Arabic numeral system and the rules for the use of its operations, in use throughout the world today, likely evolved over the course of the first millennium AD in India and was transmitted to the west via Islamic mathematics. Islamic mathematics developed and expanded the mathematics known to Central Asian civilizations, including the addition of the decimal point notation to the Arabic numerals.

The algebraic notation of the Indian mathematician Brahmagupta was syncopated (that is, some operations and quantities had symbolic representations). Addition was indicated by placing the numbers side by side, subtraction by placing a dot over the subtrahend (the number to be subtracted), and division by placing the divisor below the dividend, similar to our notation but without the bar. Multiplication, evolution, and unknown quantities were represented by abbreviations of appropriate terms.

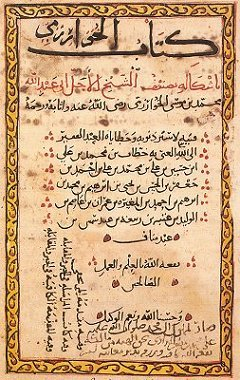
A page from al-Khwārizmī's Algebra

Despite their name, Arabic numerals have roots in India. The reason for this misnomer is Europeans saw the numerals used in an Arabic book, Concerning the Hindu Art of Reckoning, by Muhammed ibn-Musa al-Khwarizmi. Al-Khwārizmī wrote several important books on the Hindu–Arabic numerals and on methods for solving equations. His book On the Calculation with Hindu Numerals (c. 825), along with the work of Al-Kindi, were instrumental in spreading Indian mathematics and numerals to the West. Al-Khwarizmi did not claim the numerals as Arabic, but over several Latin translations, the fact that the numerals were Indian in origin was lost. The word algorithm is derived from the Latinization of Al-Khwārizmī's name, Algoritmi, and the word algebra from the title of one of his works, Al-Kitāb al-mukhtaṣar fī hīsāb al-ğabr wa'l-muqābala (The Compendious Book on Calculation by Completion and Balancing).

The modern Arabic numeral symbols used around the world first appeared in Islamic North Africa in the 10th century. A distinctive Western Arabic variant of the Eastern Arabic numerals began to emerge around the 10th century in the Maghreb and Al-Andalus (sometimes called ghubar numerals, though the term is not always accepted), which are the direct ancestor of the modern Arabic numerals used throughout the world.

Many Greek and Arabic texts on mathematics were then translated into Latin, which led to further development of mathematics in medieval Europe. In the 12th century, scholars traveled to Spain and Sicily seeking scientific Arabic texts, including al-Khwārizmī's (translated into Latin by Robert of Chester) and the complete text of Euclid's Elements (translated in various versions by Adelard of Bath, Herman of Carinthia, and Gerard of Cremona). One of the European books that advocated using the numerals was Liber Abaci, by Leonardo of Pisa, better known as Fibonacci. Liber Abaci is better known for containing a mathematical problem in which the growth of a rabbit population ends up being the Fibonacci sequence.

== Symbolic stage ==
Symbols by popular introduction date

=== Early arithmetic and multiplication ===
The transition to symbolic algebra, where only symbols are used, can first be seen in the work of Ibn al-Banna' al-Marrakushi (1256–1321) and Abu'l-Hasan ibn Ali al-Qalasadi (1412–1482). Al-Qalasādī was the last major medieval Arab algebraist, who improved on the algebraic notation earlier used in the Maghreb by Ibn al-Banna. In contrast to the syncopated notations of their predecessors, Diophantus and Brahmagupta, which lacked symbols for mathematical operations, al-Qalasadi's algebraic notation was the first to have symbols for these functions and was thus "the first steps toward the introduction of algebraic symbolism". He represented mathematical symbols using characters from the Arabic alphabet.

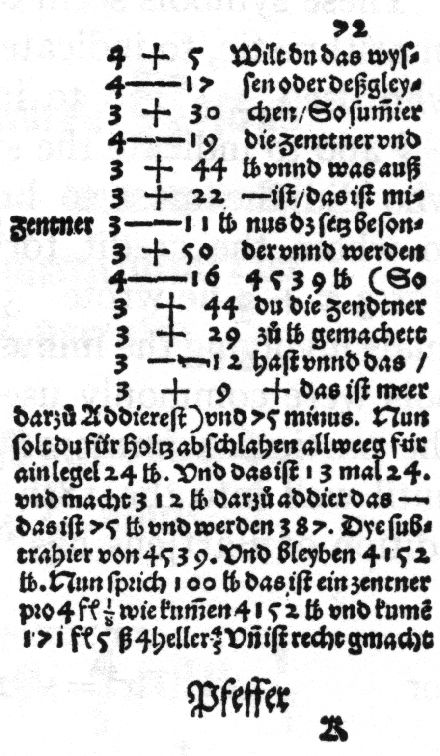
Early use of the plus and minus signs in print, by Widmann (1489)

The 14th century saw the development of new mathematical concepts to investigate a wide range of problems. The two most widely used arithmetic symbols are addition and subtraction, + and −. The plus sign was used starting around 1351 by Nicole Oresme and publicized in his work Algorismus proportionum (1360). It is thought to be an abbreviation for "et", meaning "and" in Latin, in much the same way the ampersand sign also began as "et". Oresme at the University of Paris and the Italian Giovanni di Casali independently provided graphical demonstrations of the distance covered by a body undergoing uniformly accelerated motion, asserting that the area under the line depicting the constant acceleration and represented the total distance traveled. The minus sign was used in 1489 by Johannes Widmann in Mercantile Arithmetic or Behende und hüpsche Rechenung auff allen Kauffmanschafft. Widmann used the minus symbol with the plus symbol to indicate deficit and surplus, respectively. In Summa de arithmetica, geometria, proportioni e proportionalità, Luca Pacioli used plus and minus symbols and algebra, though much of the work originated from Piero della Francesca whom he appropriated and purloined.

The radical symbol (√), for square root, was introduced by Christoph Rudolff in the early 1500s. Michael Stifel's important work Arithmetica integra contained important innovations in mathematical notation. In 1556 Niccolò Tartaglia used parentheses for precedence grouping. In 1557 Robert Recorde published The Whetstone of Witte, which introduced the equal sign (=), as well as plus and minus signs, to the English reader. In 1564 Gerolamo Cardano analyzed games of chance beginning the early stages of probability theory. Rafael Bombelli published his L'Algebra (1572) in which he showed how to deal with the imaginary quantities that could appear in Cardano's formula for solving cubic equations. Simon Stevin's book De Thiende ("The Art of Tenths"), published in Dutch in 1585, contained a systematic treatment of decimal notation, which influenced all later work on the real number system. The new algebra (1591) of François Viète introduced the modern notational manipulation of algebraic expressions.

John Napier is best known as the inventor of logarithms (published in Description of the Marvelous Canon of Logarithms) and made common the use of the decimal point in arithmetic and mathematics. After Napier, Edmund Gunter created the logarithmic scales (lines, or rules); William Oughtred used two such scales sliding by one another to perform direct multiplication and division and is credited as the inventor of the slide rule in 1622. In 1631 Oughtred introduced the multiplication sign (×), his proportionality sign (∷), and abbreviations 'sin' and 'cos' for the sine and cosine functions. Albert Girard also used the abbreviations 'sin', 'cos', and 'tan' for the trigonometric functions in his treatise.

René Descartes is credited as the father of analytical geometry, the bridge between algebra and geometry, crucial to the discovery of infinitesimal calculus and analysis. In the 17th century, Descartes introduced Cartesian co-ordinates which allowed the development of analytic geometry, bringing the notation of equations to geometry. Blaise Pascal influenced mathematics throughout his life; for instance, his Traité du triangle arithmétique ("Treatise on the Arithmetical Triangle") (1653) described a convenient tabular presentation for binomial coefficients, now called Pascal's triangle. John Wallis introduced the infinity symbol (∞) and also used this notation for infinitesimals, for example, 1/∞.

Johann Rahn introduced the division sign (÷, an obelus variant repurposed) and the therefore sign (∴) in 1659. William Jones used π in Synopsis palmariorum mathesios in 1706 because it is the initial letter of the Greek word perimetron (περιμετρον), which means perimeter in Greek. This usage was popularized in 1737 by Euler. In 1734, Pierre Bouguer used double horizontal bar below the inequality sign.

=== Derivatives notation: Leibniz and Newton ===
Derivative notations

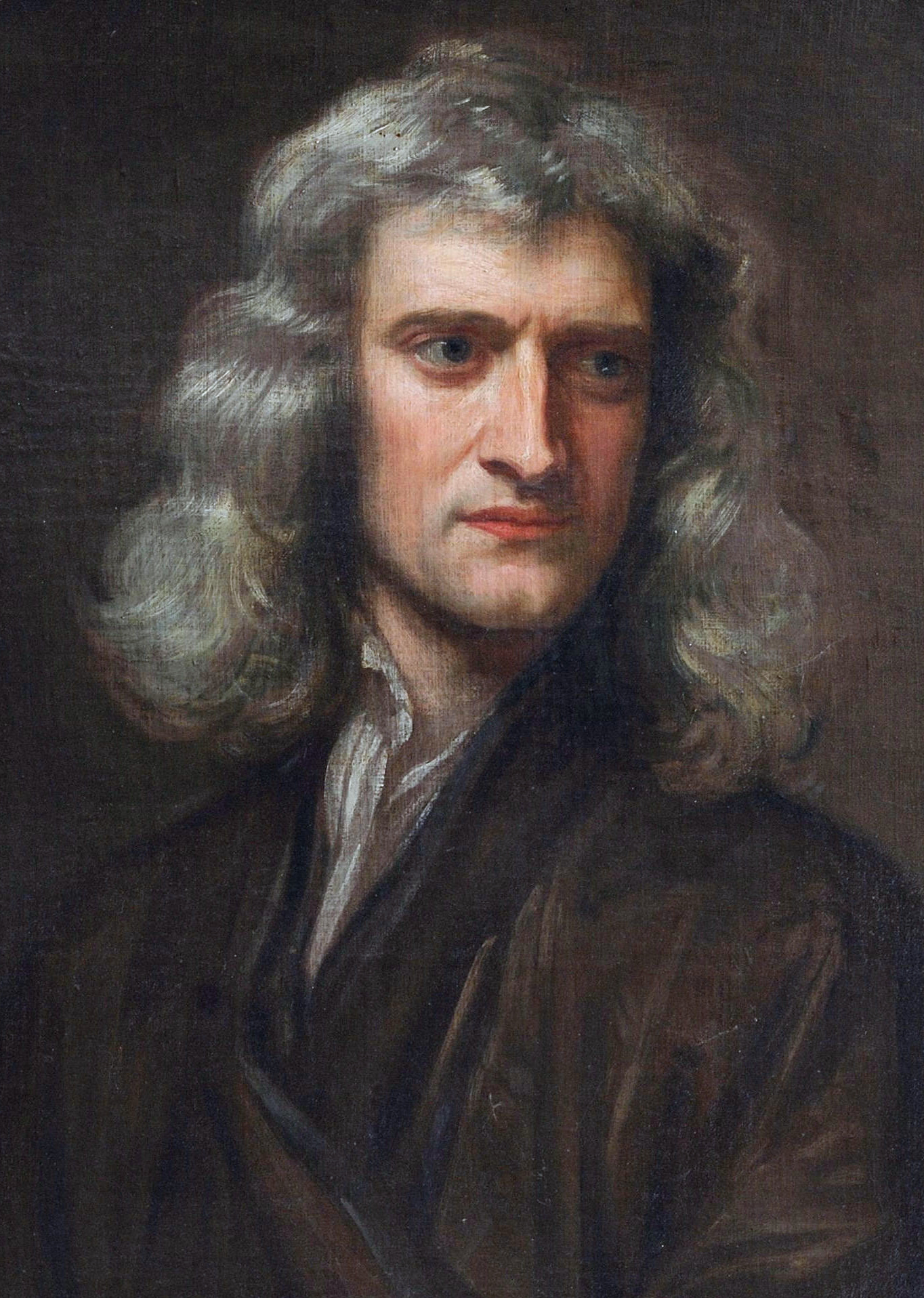
Sir Isaac Newton

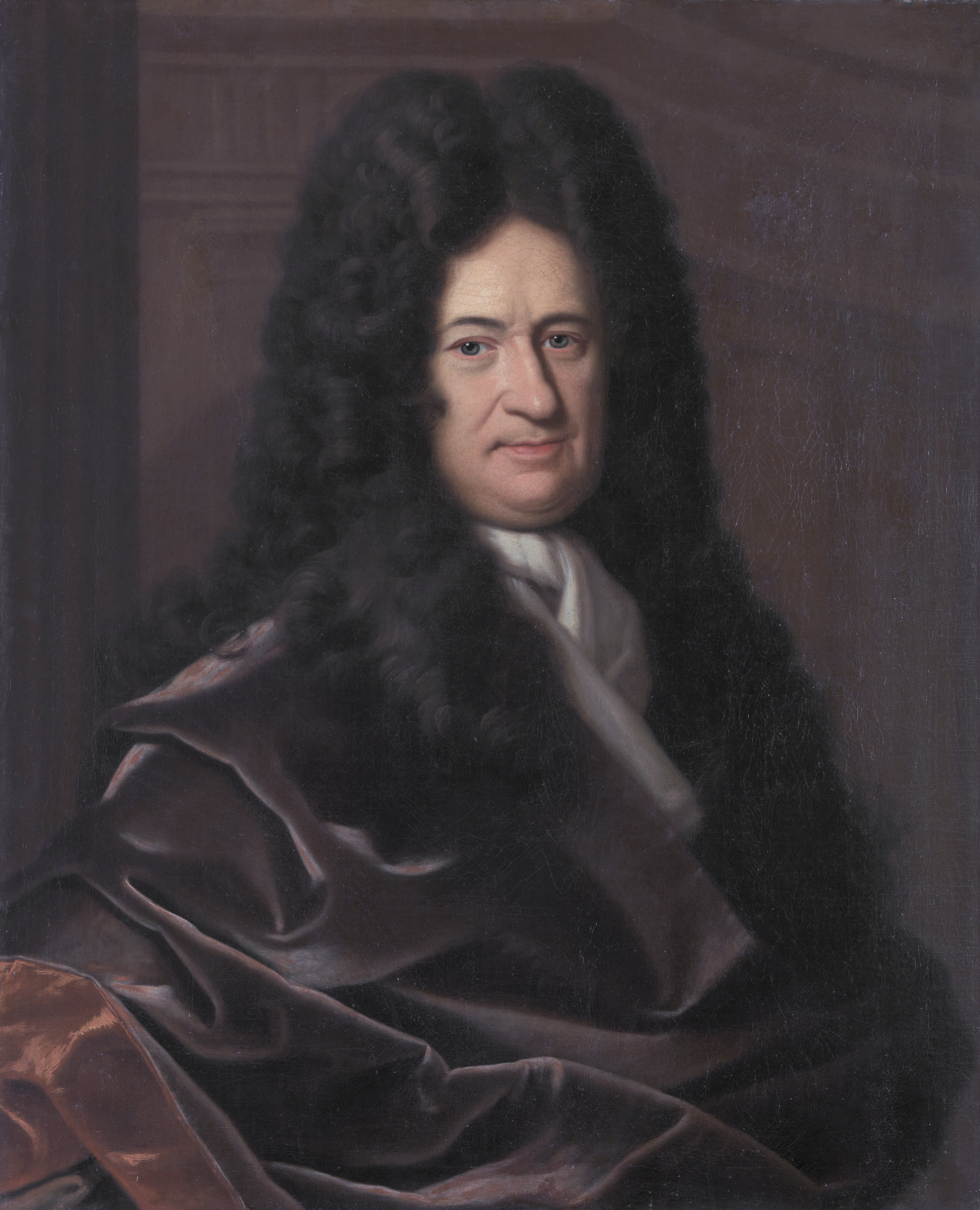
Gottfried Wilhelm Leibniz

The study of linear algebra emerged from the study of determinants, which were used to solve systems of linear equations. Calculus had two main systems of notation, each created by one of its creators: that developed by Isaac Newton and that developed by Gottfried Leibniz. Leibniz's notation is used most often today.

Newton's notation was simply a dot or dash placed above the function. For example, the derivative of the function x would be written as $\dot{x}$. The second derivative of x would be written as $\ddot{x}$. In modern usage, this notation generally denotes derivatives of physical quantities with respect to time, and is used frequently in the science of mechanics. Leibniz, on the other hand, used the letter d as a prefix to indicate differentiation, and introduced the notation representing derivatives as if they were a special type of fraction. For example, the derivative of the function x with respect to the variable t in Leibniz's notation would be written as ${ dx \over dt }$. This notation makes explicit the variable with respect to which the derivative of the function is taken. Leibniz also created the integral symbol (∫). For example: $\int_{-N}^{N} f(x)\, dx$. When finding areas under curves, integration is often illustrated by dividing the area into infinitely many tall, thin rectangles, whose areas are added. Thus, the integral symbol is an elongated S, representing the Latin word summa, meaning "sum".

=== High division operators and functions ===
At this time, letters of the alphabet were to be used as symbols of quantity; and although much diversity existed with respect to the choice of letters, there came to be several universally recognized rules. Here thus in the history of equations the first letters of the alphabet became indicatively known as coefficients, while the last letters as unknown terms (an incerti ordinis). In algebraic geometry, again, a similar rule was to be observed: the last letters of the alphabet came to denote the variable or current coordinates. Certain letters were by universal consent appropriated as symbols for the frequently occurring numbers (such as $\pi$ for 3.14159... and e for 2.7182818...), and other uses were to be avoided as much as possible. Letters, too, were to be employed as symbols of operation, and with them other previously mentioned arbitrary operation characters. The letters d and elongated S were to be appropriated as operative symbols in differential calculus and integral calculus, and $\Delta$ and $\Sigma$ in the calculus of differences. In functional notation, a letter, as a symbol of operation, is combined with another which is regarded as a symbol of quantity.

Thus, $f(x)$ denotes the mathematical result of the performance of the operation $f$ upon the subject $x$. If upon this result the same operation is repeated, the new result would be expressed by $f[f(x)]$, or more concisely by $f^2(x)$, and so on. The quantity $x$ itself regarded as the result of the same operation $f$ upon some other function; the proper symbol for which is, by analogy, $f^{-1} (x)$. Thus $f$ and $f^{-1}$ are symbols of inverse operations, the former cancelling the effect of the latter on the subject $x$. $f(x)$ and $f^{-1} (x)$ in a similar manner are termed inverse functions.

Beginning in 1718, Thomas Twinin used the division slash (solidus), deriving it from the earlier Arabic horizontal fraction bar. Pierre-Simon, Marquis de Laplace developed the widely used Laplacian differential operator (e.g. $\Delta f(p)$). In 1750, Gabriel Cramer developed Cramer's Rule for solving linear systems.

==== Euler and prime notations ====
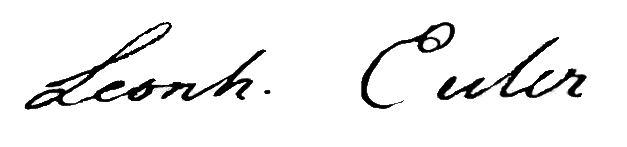
Leonhard Euler's signature

Leonhard Euler was one of the most prolific mathematicians in history, and also a prolific inventor of canonical notation. His contributions include his use of e to represent the base of natural logarithms. It is not known exactly why e was chosen, but it was probably because the first four letters of the alphabet were already commonly used to represent variables and other constants. Euler consistently used $\pi$ to represent pi. The use of $\pi$ was suggested by William Jones, who used it as shorthand for perimeter. Euler used $i$ to represent the square root of negative one ($\sqrt{-1}$) although he earlier used it as an infinite number. Today, the symbol created by John Wallis, $\infty$, is used for infinity, as in e.g. $\sum_{n=1}^\infty\frac{1}{n^2}$. For summation, Euler used an enlarged form of the upright capital Greek letter sigma (Σ), known as capital-sigma notation. This is defined as:

$\sum_{i=m}^n a_i = a_m + a_{m+1} + a_{m+2} +\cdots+ a_{n-1} + a_n.$

where i represents the index of summation; a_{i} is an indexed variable representing each successive term in the series; m is the lower bound of summation, and n is the upper bound of summation. The term "i = m" under the summation symbol means that the index i starts equal to m. The index, i, is incremented by 1 for each successive term, stopping when i = n.

For functions, Euler used the notation $f(x)$ to represent a function of $x$.

The mathematician William Emerson developed the proportionality sign (∝). Proportionality is the ratio of one quantity to another, and the sign is used to indicate the ratio between two variables is constant. Much later in the abstract expressions of the value of various proportional phenomena, the parts-per notation would become useful as a set of pseudo-units to describe small values of miscellaneous dimensionless quantities. Marquis de Condorcet, in 1768, advanced the partial differential sign (∂), known as the curly d or Jacobi's delta. The prime symbol (′) for derivatives was made by Joseph-Louis Lagrange.

But in our opinion truths of this kind should be drawn from notions rather than from notations.

— Carl Friedrich Gauss, writing about the proof of Wilson's theorem

==== Gauss, Hamilton, and matrix notations ====
At the turn of the 19th century, Carl Friedrich Gauss developed the identity sign for congruence relation and, in quadratic reciprocity, the integral part. Gauss developed functions of complex variables, functions of geometry, and functions for the convergence of series. He devised satisfactory proofs of the fundamental theorem of algebra and the quadratic reciprocity law. Gauss developed the Gaussian elimination method of solving linear systems, which was initially listed as an advancement in geodesy. He would also develop the product sign ($\textstyle \prod$).

In the 1800s, Christian Kramp promoted factorial notation during his research in generalized factorial function which applied to non-integers. Joseph Diaz Gergonne introduced the set inclusion signs (⊆, ⊇), later redeveloped by Ernst Schröder. Peter Gustav Lejeune Dirichlet developed Dirichlet L-functions to give the proof of Dirichlet's theorem on arithmetic progressions and began analytic number theory. In 1829, Carl Gustav Jacob Jacobi published Fundamenta nova theoriae functionum ellipticarum with his elliptic theta functions.

Matrix notation would be more fully developed by Arthur Cayley in his three papers, on subjects which had been suggested by reading the Mécanique analytique of Lagrange and some of the works of Laplace. Cayley defined matrix multiplication and matrix inverses. Cayley used a single letter to denote a matrix, thus treating a matrix as an aggregate object. He also realized the connection between matrices and determinants, and wrote "There would be many things to say about this theory of matrices which should, it seems to me, precede the theory of determinants."

William Rowan Hamilton introduced the nabla symbol ($\nabla$ or, later called del, ∇) for vector differentials. This was previously used by Hamilton as a general-purpose operator sign. $\hat{H}$, $H$, and $\check{H}$ are used for the Hamiltonian operator in quantum mechanics and $\mathcal{H}$ (or ℋ ) for the Hamiltonian function in classical Hamiltonian mechanics. In mathematics, Hamilton is perhaps best known as the inventor of quaternion notation and biquaternions.

==== Maxwell, Clifford, and Ricci notations ====
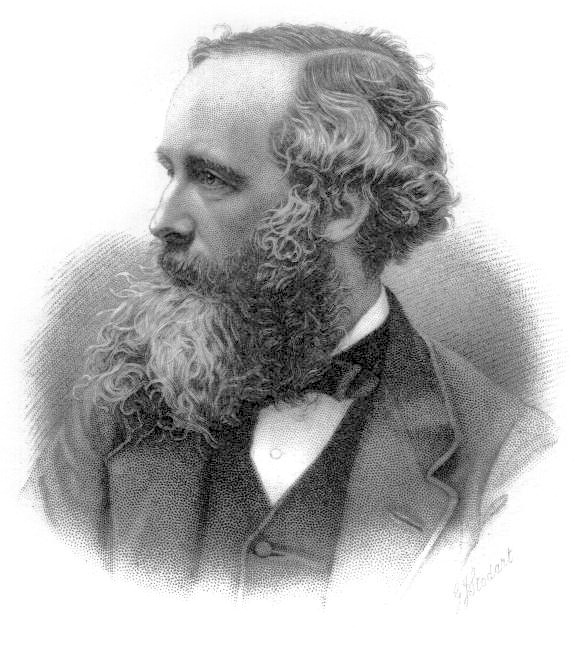
James Clerk Maxwell Maxwell's most prominent achievement was to formulate a set of equations that united previously unrelated observations, experiments, and equations of electricity, magnetism, and optics into a consistent theory.

In 1864 James Clerk Maxwell reduced all of the then-current knowledge of electromagnetism into a linked set of differential equations with 20 equations in 20 variables, contained in A Dynamical Theory of the Electromagnetic Field. (See Maxwell's equations.) The method of calculation that is necessary to employ was given by Lagrange, and afterwards developed, with some modifications, by Hamilton's equations. It is usually referred to as Hamilton's principle; when the equations in the original form are used, they are known as Lagrange's equations. In 1871 Richard Dedekind defined a field to be a set of real or complex numbers which is closed under the four arithmetic operations. In 1873 Maxwell presented A Treatise on Electricity and Magnetism.

In 1878 William Kingdon Clifford published his Elements of Dynamic. Clifford developed split-biquaternions (e.g. $q = w + xi + yj + zk$) which he called algebraic motors. Clifford obviated quaternion study by separating the dot product and cross product of two vectors from the complete quaternion notation.

The common vector notations are used when working with spatial vectors or more abstract members of vector spaces, while angle notation (or phasor notation) is a notation used in electronics.

Lord Kelvin's aetheric atom theory (1860s) led Peter Guthrie Tait, in 1885, to publish a topological table of knots with up to ten crossings known as the Tait conjectures. Tensor calculus was developed by Gregorio Ricci-Curbastro between 1887 and 1896, presented in 1892 under the title Absolute differential calculus, and the contemporary usage of "tensor" was stated by Woldemar Voigt in 1898. In 1895, Henri Poincaré published Analysis Situs. In 1897, Charles Proteus Steinmetz would publish Theory and Calculation of Alternating Current Phenomena, with the assistance of Ernst J. Berg.

==== From formula mathematics to tensors ====
In 1895 Giuseppe Peano issued his Formulario mathematico, an effort to digest mathematics into terse text based on special symbols. He would provide a definition of a vector space and linear map. He would also introduce the intersection sign ($\cap$), the union sign ($\cup$), the membership sign (∈), and existential quantifier (∃). Peano would pass to Bertrand Russell his work in 1900 at a Paris conference; it so impressed Russell that he too was taken with the drive to render mathematics more concisely. The result was Principia Mathematica written with Alfred North Whitehead. This treatise marks a watershed in modern literature where symbol became dominant. Peano's Formulario Mathematico, though less popular than Russell's work, continued through five editions. The fifth appeared in 1908 and included 4,200 formulas and theorems.

Ricci-Curbastro and Tullio Levi-Civita popularized the tensor index notation around 1900.

=== Mathematical logic and abstraction ===
Abstraction
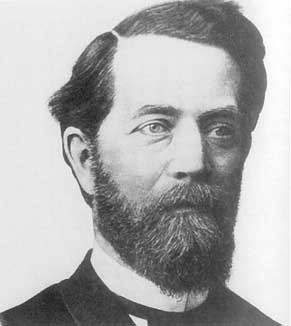
Felix Klein

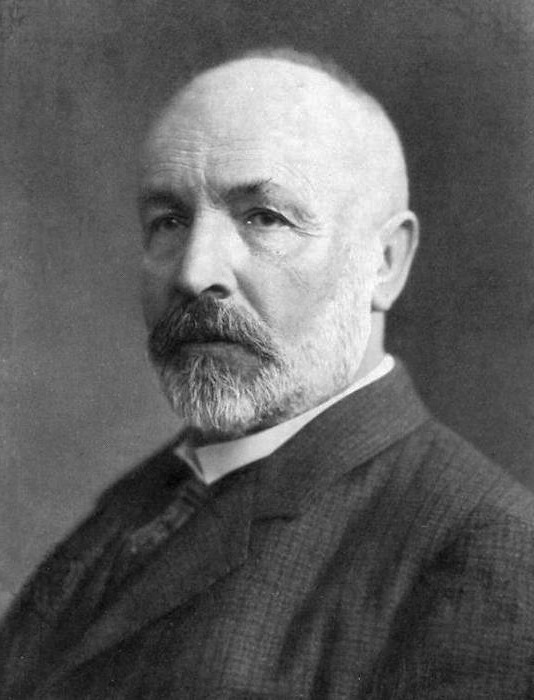
Georg Cantor

Georg Cantor introduced Aleph numbers, so named because they use the aleph symbol (א) with natural number subscripts to denote cardinality in infinite sets. For the ordinals he employed the Greek letter ω (omega). This notation is still in use today in ordinal notation of a finite sequence of symbols from a finite alphabet that names an ordinal number according to some scheme which gives meaning to the language.

After the turn of the 20th century, Josiah Willard Gibbs introduced into physical chemistry the middle dot for dot product and the multiplication sign for cross products. He also supplied notation for the scalar and vector products, which were introduced in Vector Analysis. Bertrand Russell shortly afterward introduced logical disjunction (or) in 1906. Gerhard Kowalewski and Cuthbert Edmund Cullis introduced and helped standardized matrices notation, and parenthetical matrix and box matrix notation, respectively.

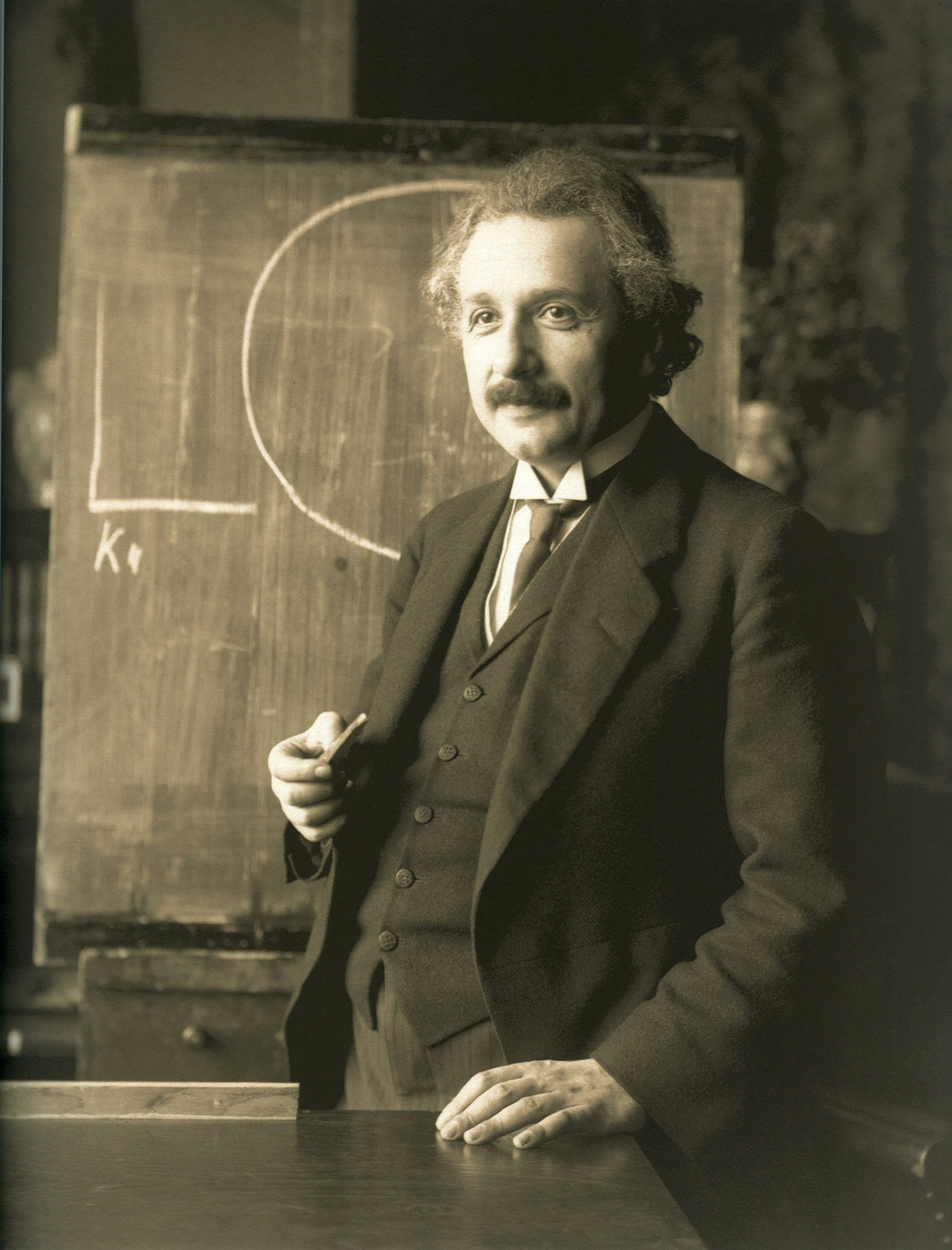
Albert Einstein (1921)

Albert Einstein, in 1916, introduced Einstein notation, which summed over a set of indexed terms in a formula, thus exerting notational brevity. For example, for indices ranging over the set {1, 2, 3},

$$y = \sum_{i=1}^3 c_i x^i = c_1 x^1 + c_2 x^2 + c_3 x^3$$

is reduced by convention to:

$y = c_i x^i \,.$

Upper indices are not exponents but are indices of coordinates, coefficients, or basis vectors.

In 1917 Arnold Sommerfeld created the contour integral sign, and Dimitry Mirimanoff proposed the axiom of regularity. In 1919, Theodor Kaluza would solve general relativity equations using five dimensions, the results would have electromagnetic equations emerge. This would be published in 1921 in "Zum Unitätsproblem der Physik". In 1922, Abraham Fraenkel and Thoralf Skolem independently proposed replacing the axiom schema of specification with the axiom schema of replacement. Also in 1922, Zermelo–Fraenkel set theory was developed. In 1923, Steinmetz would publish Four Lectures on Relativity and Space. Around 1924, Jan Arnoldus Schouten developed the modern notation and formalism for the Ricci calculus framework during the absolute differential calculus applications to general relativity and differential geometry in the early twentieth century. Ricci calculus constitutes the rules of index notation and manipulation for tensors and tensor fields. In 1925, Enrico Fermi described a system comprising many identical particles that obey the Pauli exclusion principle, afterwards developing a diffusion equation (Fermi age equation). In 1926, Oskar Klein develop the Kaluza–Klein theory. In 1928, Emil Artin abstracted ring theory with Artinian rings. In 1933, Andrey Kolmogorov introduces the Kolmogorov axioms. In 1937, Bruno de Finetti deduced the "operational subjective" concept.

==== Mathematical symbolism ====
Mathematical abstraction began as a process of extracting the underlying essence of a mathematical concept, removing any dependence on real world objects with which it might originally have been connected, and generalizing it so that it has wider applications or matching among other abstract descriptions of equivalent phenomena. Two abstract areas of modern mathematics are category theory and model theory. Bertrand Russell once said, "Ordinary language is totally unsuited for expressing what physics really asserts, since the words of everyday life are not sufficiently abstract. Only mathematics and mathematical logic can say as little as the physicist means to say." Though, one can substitute mathematics for real world objects, and wander off through equation after equation, and can build a concept structure which has no relation to reality.

Some of the introduced mathematical logic notation during this time included the set of symbols used in Boolean algebra. This was created by George Boole in 1854. Boole himself did not see logic as a branch of mathematics, but it has come to be encompassed anyway. Symbols found in Boolean algebra include $\land$ (and), $\lor$ (or), and $\lnot$ (not). With these symbols, and letters to represent different truth values, one can make logical statements such as $a\lor\lnot a=1$, that is "(a is true or a is not true) is true", meaning it is true that a is either true or not true (i.e. false). Boolean algebra has many practical uses as it is, but it also was the start of what would be a large set of symbols to be used in logic. Most of these symbols can be found in propositional calculus, a formal system described as $\mathcal{L} = \mathcal{L}\ (\Alpha,\ \Omega,\ \Zeta,\ \Iota)$. $\Alpha$ is the set of elements, such as the a in the example with Boolean algebra above. $\Omega$ is the set that contains the subsets that contain operations, such as $\lor$ or $\land$. $\Zeta$ contains the inference rules, which are the rules dictating how inferences may be logically made, and $\Iota$ contains the axioms. Predicate logic, originally called predicate calculus, expands on propositional logic by the introduction of variables, usually denoted by x, y, z, or other lowercase letters, and by sentences containing variables, called predicates. These are usually denoted by an uppercase letter followed by a list of variables, such as P(x) or Q(y,z). Predicate logic uses special symbols for quantifiers: ∃ for "there exists" and ∀ for "for all".

==== Gödel incompleteness notation ====
To every ω-consistent recursive class κ of formulae there correspond recursive class signs r, such that neither v Gen r nor Neg (v Gen r) belongs to Flg (κ) (where v is the free variable of r).

— Kurt Gödel

While proving his incompleteness theorems, Kurt Gödel created an alternative to the symbols normally used in logic. He used Gödel numbers—numbers assigned to represent mathematical operations—and variables with the prime numbers greater than 10. With Gödel numbers, a logic statement can be broken down into a number sequence. By taking the n prime numbers to the power of the Gödel numbers in the sequence, and then multiplying the terms together, a unique final product is generated. In this way, every logic statement can be encoded as its own number.

For example, take the statement "There exists a number x such that it is not y". Using the symbols of propositional calculus, this would become

$$(\exists x)(x=\lnot y)$$.

If the Gödel numbers replace the symbols, it becomes:

$$\{8, 4, 11, 9, 8, 11, 5, 1, 13, 9\}$$.

There are ten numbers, so the first ten prime numbers are used:

$$\{2, 3, 5, 7, 11, 13, 17, 19, 23, 29\}$$.

Then, each prime is raised to the power of the corresponding Gödel number, and multiplied:

$$2^8\times3^4\times5^{11}\times7^9\times11^8\times13^{11}\times17^5\times19^1\times23^{13}\times29^9$$.

The resulting number is approximately $3.096262735\times10^{78}$.

=== Contemporary notation and topics ===
==== Early 20th-century notation ====
The abstraction of notation is an ongoing process. The historical development of many mathematical topics exhibits a progression from the concrete to the abstract. Throughout 20th century, various set notations were developed for fundamental object sets. Around 1924, David Hilbert and Richard Courant published Methods of mathematical physics. Partial differential equations. In 1926, Oskar Klein and Walter Gordon proposed the Klein–Gordon equation to describe relativistic particles:

$\frac {1}{c^2} \frac{\partial^2}{\partial t^2} \psi - \nabla^2 \psi + \frac {m^2 c^2}{\hbar^2} \psi = 0.$

The first formulation of a quantum theory describing radiation and matter interaction is due to Paul Adrien Maurice Dirac, who, during 1920, was first able to compute the coefficient of spontaneous emission of an atom. In 1928, the relativistic Dirac equation was formulated by Dirac to explain the behavior of the relativistically moving electron. The Dirac equation in the form originally proposed by Dirac is:

$\left(\beta mc^2 + \sum_{k = 1}^3 \alpha_k p_k \, c\right) \psi (\mathbf{x},t) = i \hbar \frac{\partial\psi(\mathbf{x},t) }{\partial t}$

where, ψ = ψ(x, t) is the wave function for the electron, x and t are the space and time coordinates, m is the rest mass of the electron, p is the momentum (understood to be the momentum operator in the Schrödinger theory), c is the speed of light, and ħ = h/2π is the reduced Planck constant. Dirac described the quantification of the electromagnetic field as an ensemble of harmonic oscillators with the introduction of the concept of creation and annihilation operators of particles. In the following years, with contributions from Wolfgang Pauli, Eugene Wigner, Pascual Jordan, and Werner Heisenberg, and an elegant formulation of quantum electrodynamics due to Enrico Fermi, physicists came to believe that, in principle, it would be possible to perform any computation for any physical process involving photons and charged particles.

In 1931, Alexandru Proca developed the Proca equation (Euler–Lagrange equation) for the vector meson theory of nuclear forces and the relativistic quantum field equations. John Archibald Wheeler in 1937 developed the S-matrix. Studies by Felix Bloch with Arnold Nordsieck, and Victor Weisskopf, in 1937 and 1939, revealed that such computations were reliable only at a first order of perturbation theory, a problem already pointed out by Robert Oppenheimer. Infinities emerged at higher orders in the series, making such computations meaningless and casting serious doubts on the internal consistency of the theory itself. With no solution for this problem known at the time, it appeared that a fundamental incompatibility existed between special relativity and quantum mechanics.

In the 1930s, the double-struck capital Z ($\mathbb{Z}$) for integer number sets was created by Edmund Landau. Nicolas Bourbaki created the double-struck capital Q ($\mathbb{Q}$) for rational number sets. In 1935 Gerhard Gentzen made universal quantifiers. André Weil and Nicolas Bourbaki would develop the empty set sign (∅) in 1939. That same year, Nathan Jacobson would coin the double-struck capital C ($\mathbb{C}$) for complex number sets.

Around the 1930s, Voigt notation (so named to honor Voigt's 1898 work) would be developed for multilinear algebra as a way to represent a symmetric tensor by reducing its order. Schönflies notation became one of two conventions used to describe point groups (the other being Hermann–Mauguin notation). Also in this time, van der Waerden notation became popular for the usage of two-component spinors (Weyl spinors) in four spacetime dimensions. Arend Heyting would introduce Heyting algebra and Heyting arithmetic.

The arrow (→) was developed for function notation in 1936 by Øystein Ore to denote images of specific elements and to denote Galois connections. Later, in 1940, it took its present form (f: X→Y) through the work of Witold Hurewicz. Werner Heisenberg, in 1941, proposed the S-matrix theory of particle interactions.

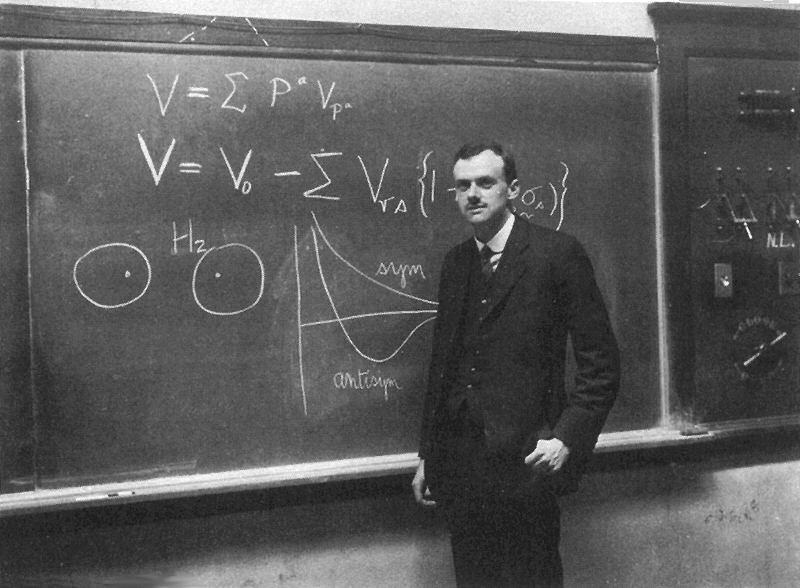
Paul Dirac made fundamental contributions to the early development of both quantum mechanics and quantum electrodynamics.

Bra–ket notation (Dirac notation) is a standard notation for describing quantum states, composed of angle brackets and vertical bars. It can also be used to denote abstract vectors and linear functionals. It is so called because the inner product (or dot product on a complex vector space) of two states is denoted by a ⟨bra|ket⟩: $\langle\phi|\psi\rangle$. The notation was introduced in 1939 by Paul Dirac, though the notation has precursors in Grassmann's use of the notation [φ|ψ] for his inner products nearly 100 years previously.

Bra–ket notation is widespread in quantum mechanics: almost every phenomenon that is explained using quantum mechanics—including a large portion of modern physics—is usually explained with the help of bra–ket notation. The notation establishes an encoded abstract representation-independence, producing a versatile specific representation (e.g., x, or p, or eigenfunction base) without much ado, or excessive reliance on, the nature of the linear spaces involved. The overlap expression ⟨φ|ψ⟩ is typically interpreted as the probability amplitude for the state ψ to collapse into the state ϕ. The Feynman slash notation (Dirac slash notation) was developed by Richard Feynman for the study of Dirac fields in quantum field theory.

Geoffrey Chew, along with others, would promote matrix notation for the strong interaction in particle physics, and the associated bootstrap principle, in 1960. In the 1960s, set-builder notation was developed for describing a set by stating the properties that its members must satisfy. Also in the 1960s, tensors are abstracted within category theory by means of the concept of monoidal category. Later, multi-index notation eliminates conventional notions used in multivariable calculus, partial differential equations, and the theory of distributions, by abstracting the concept of an integer index to an ordered tuple of indices.

==== Modern mathematical notation ====
In the modern mathematics of special relativity, electromagnetism, and wave theory, the d'Alembert operator ($\scriptstyle\Box$) is the Laplace operator of Minkowski space. The Levi-Civita symbol (ε), also known as the permutation symbol, is used in tensor calculus.

Feynman diagrams are used in particle physics, equivalent to the operator-based approach of Sin-Itiro Tomonaga and Julian Schwinger. The orbifold notation system, invented by William Thurston, has been developed for representing types of symmetry groups in two-dimensional spaces of constant curvature.

The tetrad formalism (tetrad index notation) was introduced as an approach to general relativity that replaces the choice of a coordinate basis by the less restrictive choice of a local basis for the tangent bundle (a locally defined set of four linearly independent vector fields called a tetrad).

In the 1990s, Roger Penrose proposed Penrose graphical notation (tensor diagram notation) as a, usually handwritten, visual depiction of multilinear functions or tensors. Penrose also introduced abstract index notation. His usage of the Einstein summation was in order to offset the inconvenience in describing contractions and covariant differentiation in modern abstract tensor notation, while maintaining explicit covariance of the expressions involved.

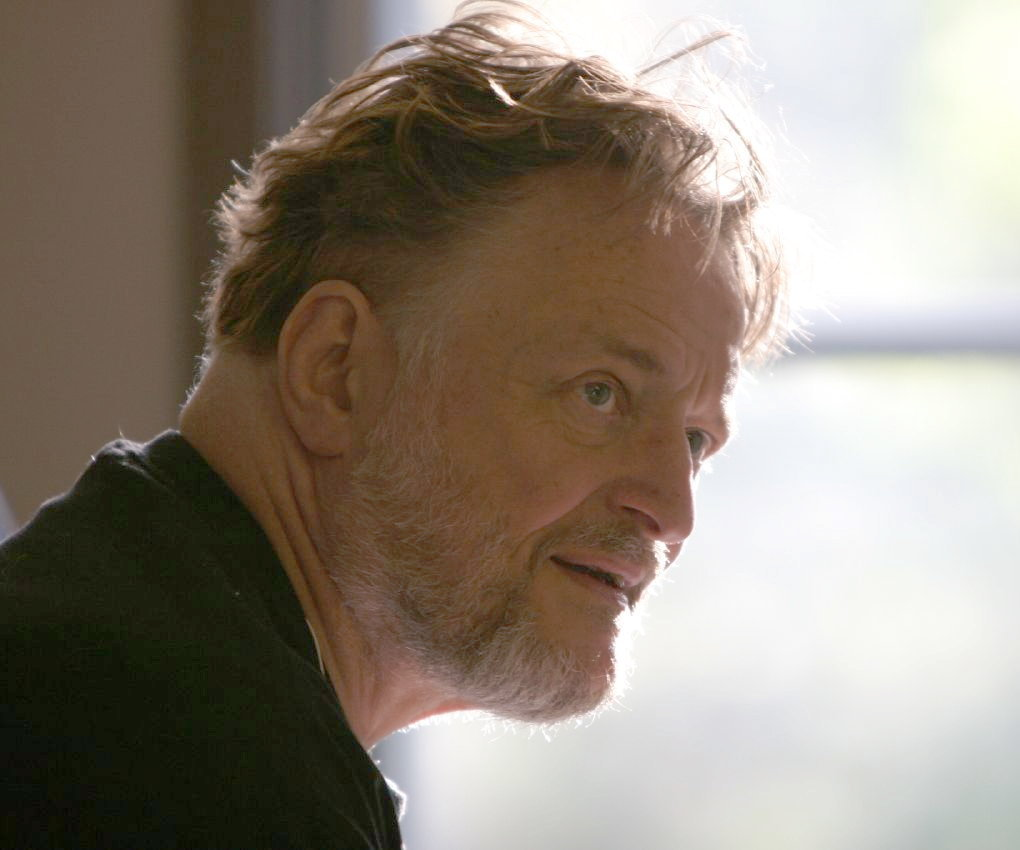
John Conway, prolific mathematician of notation

John Conway furthered various notations, including the Conway chained arrow notation, the Conway notation of knot theory, and the Conway polyhedron notation. The Coxeter notation system classifies symmetry groups, describing the angles between with fundamental reflections of a Coxeter group. It uses a bracketed notation, with modifiers to indicate certain subgroups. The notation is named after H. S. M. Coxeter; Norman Johnson more comprehensively defined it.

Combinatorial LCF notation, devised by Joshua Lederberg and extended by Harold Scott MacDonald Coxeter and Robert Frucht, was developed for the representation of cubic graphs that are Hamiltonian. The cycle notation is the convention for writing down a permutation in terms of its constituent cycles. This is also called circular notation and the permutation called a cyclic or circular permutation.

==== Computers and markup notation ====
In 1931, IBM produces the IBM 601 Multiplying Punch; it is an electromechanical machine that could read two numbers, up to eight digits long, from a card and punch their product onto the same card. In 1934, Wallace Eckert used a rigged IBM 601 Multiplying Punch to automate the integration of differential equations.

In 1962, Kenneth E. Iverson developed an integral part notation, which became known as Iverson notation, that developed into APL. In the 1970s within computer architecture, Quote notation was developed for a representing number system of rational numbers. Also in this decade, the Z notation (just like the APL language, long before it) uses many non-ASCII symbols, the specification includes suggestions for rendering the Z notation symbols in ASCII and in LaTeX. There are presently various C mathematical functions (Math.h) and numerical libraries used to perform numerical calculations in software development. These calculations can be handled by symbolic executions—analyzing a program to determine what inputs cause each part of a program to execute. Mathematica and SymPy are examples of computational software programs based on symbolic mathematics.

== References and citations ==
General

- Florian Cajori (1929) A History of Mathematical Notations, 2 vols. Dover reprint in 1 vol., 1993. ISBN 0-486-67766-4.

Citations
