= Henricus Grammateus =

German mathematician

Heinrich Schreiber
- Born: Before 1496 (probably 1492); Erfurt, Holy Roman Empire
- Died: 1525 or 1526; Vienna, Archduchy of Austria
- Education: University of Vienna
- Known for: Plus and minus signs
- Scientific career
- Fields: Mathematics
- Workplaces: University of Vienna

Henricus Grammateus (also known as Henricus Scriptor, Heinrich Schreyber or Heinrich Schreiber; 1495 – 1525 or 1526) was a German mathematician. He was born in Erfurt. In 1507 he started to study at the University of Vienna, where he subsequently taught. Christoph Rudolff was one of his students. From 1514 to 1517 he studied in Kraków and then returned to Vienna. But when the plague affected Vienna Schreiber left the city and went to Nuremberg.

In 1518, he published details of a new musical temperament, which is now named after him, for the harpsichord. It was a precursor of the equal temperament.

In 1525 Schreiber was back in Vienna, where he is listed as "Examinator", i.e. eligible to work holding exams.

== Works ==
- Algorithmus proportionum una cum monochordi generalis dyatonici compositione, pub. Volfgangvm De Argentina, Kraków, 1514
- Libellus de compositione regularum pro vasorum mensuratione. Deque arte ista tota theoreticae et practicae, Vienna, 1518
- Ayn new Kunstlich Buech (A New Skill Book), Vienna 1518, Nuremberg 1521 - contains (besides Johannes Widmann) the earliest-known use of the plus and minus signs for addition and subtraction and is the earliest German text on bookkeeping
