= William Batecumbe =

English mathematician

William Batecumbe or Badecumbe (fl. 1348) was an English mathematician and astrologer. His work is largely lost: some works of later authors have been attributed to him.

== Life ==
Batecumbe was at the University of Oxford, where he was magister.

== Works ==
Batecumbe produced a 1348 edition of the Alphonsine tables. Tabula mediorum motuum Planetarum in annis collectis et expansis, composita a magistro Batecombe, a manuscript preserved in the library of Magdalen College, Oxford, and a manuscript listed a formerly belonging to John Dee and named "Tabulæ Latitudinum secundum Bachecombe", are taken to be derived works.

De Sphæræ concavæ fabrica et usu, a copy of which was seen by John Bale in the library of Robert Recorde, and De Sphæra solida, are late attributions.
