= List of Welsh mathematicians =

Mathematicians of Welsh nationality

This is a list of Welsh mathematicians, who have contributed to the development of mathematics.

Name	Image	Born	Died	Notes
Brian Bowditch		1961; Neath	n/a	Known for his contributions to geometry and topology, particularly in the areas of geometric group theory and low-dimensional topology. He is also known for solving the angel problem. Bowditch holds a chaired Professor appointment in Mathematics at the University of Warwick.
George H. Bryan		1 Mar 1864; Cambridge	13 Oct 1928; Bordighera	Credited with developing the modern mathematical treatment of the motion of airplanes in flight. In 1888, Bryan developed mathematical models for fluid pressures within a pipe and for external buckling pressures. These models are still used today. Aside from minor differences in notation, Bryan's 1911 equations are the same as those used today to evaluate modern aircraft. Born at Cambridge, he was Professor of Mathematics at Bangor University 1896 till 1928.
Griffith Davies		5 Dec 1788; Llandwrog	25 Mar 1855; Islington	Noted actuary and author, born in Llandwrog, Caernarfon. Fellow of the Royal Society.
Lancelot Hogben		9 Dec 1895; Portsmouth	22 Aug 1975; Wrexham	Medical statistician, founder of the Society for Experimental Biology, and author of Mathematics for the Million (1936). Learnt Welsh and lived and died in Glyn Ceiriog, Wrexham, Wales.
William Jones		1675; Llanfihangel Tre'r Beirdd	1 Jul 1749; London	Born in Anglesey in 1675, was the first recorded mathematician to use the symbol π in its present sense in 1706, though it would not achieve widespread adoption until used by famed Swiss mathematician Euler.
Thomas Jones		23 Jun 1756; Berriew	18 Jul 1807; Edgware Road	Senior Wrangler and Senior Tutor of Trinity College, Cambridge.
John T. Lewis		15 Apr 1932; Swansea	21 Jan 2004; Dublin	Contributed to quantum measurement, Bose–Einstein condensation and large deviations theory.
William Morgan		26 May 1750; Bridgend	4 May 1833; London	Considered the father of modern actuarial science.
Richard Price		23 Feb 1723; Llangeinor	19 Apr 1791; Newington Green	Wrote a paper on the proper method of calculating the values of contingent reversions which were said to have exercised a beneficial influence in drawing attention to the inadequate calculations on which many insurance and benefit societies had recently been formed. In 1769 Price received the degree of D.D. from the university of Glasgow for this work. He also wrote on finance, economics, probability, and life insurance. Price edited Bayes's major work An Essay towards solving a Problem in the Doctrine of Chances (1763), which contains the Bayes' Theorem with an introduction to the paper which provides some of the philosophical basis of Bayesian statistics. In 1765 he was elected a Fellow of the Royal Society in recognition of his work on the legacy of Bayes.
Robert Recorde		1510; Tenby	1558; London	Sixteenth-century inventor of the equals sign was from Tenby. As it has been suggested, "[h]is equals sign was an invention that, while slow in becoming universally adopted, is still perhaps the most fundamental thing ever invented by a Welsh person.".
Elmer Gethin Rees		19 Nov 1941; Llandybie	4 Oct 2019; Bristol	A Welsh mathematician and Director of the Heilbronn Institute for Mathematical Research from its creation in 2005 until 2009.
Bertrand Russell		18 May 1872; Trellech	2 Feb 1970; Plas Penrhyn, Penrhyndeudraeth	Influential British thinker of the twentieth century, though more properly a philosopher than a mathematician, was of English descent but born in Monmouthshire.
Neil Sloane		10 Oct 1939; Beaumaris		Neil James Alexander Sloane FLSW has had major contributions in combinatorics, error-correcting codes, and sphere packing. He is perhaps best known for being the creator and maintainer of the On-Line Encyclopedia of Integer Sequences (OEIS).
Mary Wynne Warner		22 Jun 1932; Carmarthen	1 Apr 1998; Spain	'Pioneer' in fuzzy mathematics, born in Carmarthen.
