= Lazy Eight =

Lazy Eight or Lazy 8 may refer to:

- The infinity symbol ($\infty$), often described as a horizontal figure eight
- An aerobatic maneuver consisting of 1/4 looping up, wingover (left or right), 1/2 looping down+up, wingover (right or left), 1/4 looping down
- VistaVision, a high resolution 35mm film format
- Lazy 8 Studios, an independent game developer
- "Lazy 8", a music track released as a single B-side by Australian metal band Dumb and the Ugly
