= Commercial minus sign =

Northern European form of minus sign

⁒o

Commercial minus sign
- In Unicode: U+2052 ⁒ COMMERCIAL MINUS SIGN

Different from
- Different from: U+0025 % PERCENT SIGN; U+00F7 ÷ DIVISION SIGN; U+066A ٪ ARABIC PERCENT SIGN

The commercial minus sign (German: abzüglich, Swedish: med avdrag av) is a typographical and mathematical symbol used in commercial and financial documents in some European languages, in specific contexts.

== As a symbol for arithmetic negation ==
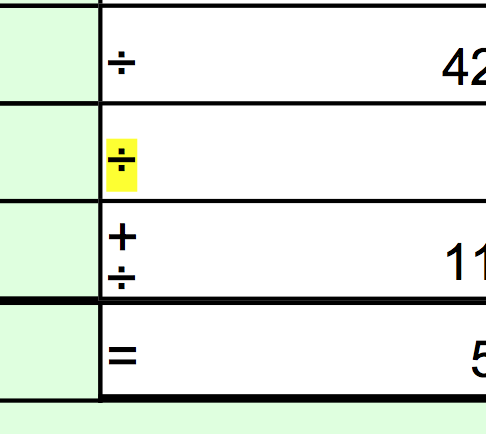
A ÷ being used as a sign of subtraction in this excerpt from an official Norwegian trading statement form called Næringsoppgave 1, used for tax purposes.

In some commercial and financial documents, especially in Germany and Scandinavia, the symbol ÷ was used to indicate subtraction or to denote a negative quantity. (Note: The symbol : was used to denote division, as in 6:3=2.) Because the ÷ symbol had already been encoded as U+00F7 ÷ DIVISION SIGN, the Unicode Consortium allocated another code point (U+2052) to uniquely identify this (negation) usage. The representative glyph used in the Unicode standard resembles an italic form of that division sign; the exact form of the symbol displayed is typeface (computer font) dependent.

According to the Unicode Consortium, the symbol "may also be used as a dingbat to indicate correctness" and is "used in the Finno-Ugric Phonetic Alphabet to indicate a related borrowed form with different sound".

== Typographic variant ==
In Germany, the form ./. was used an alternative to the formal form of the symbol, since this could be conveniently typed on a typewriter.

According the Unicode code charts, version 17, regarding this symbol, "a common glyph variant and fallback representation looks like ./."

== See also ==
- Obelus – Historical annotation mark or symbol – Predecessor of this variant
- Division sign – Mathematical symbol
- Plus and minus signs – Mathematical symbols (+ and −)
- Percent sign – Symbol for the fraction of a hundred
  - Arabic percent sign ٪ (almost identical symbol except that the dots are squares rather than circles)
- Flourish of approval – Symbol for a correct response in the Netherlands.
