= Prime (symbol) =

Typographical symbol

′ ″ ‴ ⁗o

Prime
- In Unicode: U+2032 ′ PRIME; U+2033 ″ DOUBLE PRIME; U+2034 ‴ TRIPLE PRIME; U+2057 ⁗ QUADRUPLE PRIME

Different from
- Different from: U+0027 ' APOSTROPHE; U+0022 " QUOTATION MARK; U+02BB ʻ MODIFIER LETTER TURNED COMMA (ʻOkina)

The prime symbol ′, double prime symbol ″, triple prime symbol ‴, and quadruple prime symbol ⁗ are used to designate units and for other purposes in mathematics, science, linguistics and music.

Although the characters differ little in appearance from those of the apostrophe and single and double quotation marks, the uses of the prime symbol are quite different. While an apostrophe is now often used in place of the prime, and a double quote in place of the double prime (due to the lack of prime symbols on everyday writing keyboards), such substitutions are not considered appropriate in formal materials or in typesetting.

== Designation of units ==
The prime symbol ′ is commonly used to represent feet (ft), and the double prime ″ is used to represent inches (in). The triple prime ‴, as used in watchmaking, represents a ligne (1/12 of a "French" inch, or pouce, about 2.26 millimetres or 0.089 inches).

Primes are also used for angles. The prime symbol ′ is used for arcminutes (1/60 of a degree), and the double prime ″ for arcseconds (1/60 of an arcminute). As an angular measurement, 3° 5′ 30″ means 3 degrees, 5 arcminutes and 30 arcseconds. In historical astronomical works, the triple prime was used to denote "thirds" (1/60 of an arcsecond) and a quadruple prime ⁗ "fourths" (1/60 of a third of arc), (Note: John Wallis, in his Mathesis universalis, generalized this notation to include higher multiples of 60; giving as an example the number 49‵‵‵‵36‵‵‵25‵‵15‵1°15′2″36‴49⁗; where the numbers to the left are multiplied by higher powers of 60, the numbers to the right are divided by powers of 60, and the number marked with the superscripted zero is multiplied by 1.) but modern usage has replaced this with decimal fractions of an arcsecond.

Primes are sometimes used to indicate minutes, and double primes to indicate seconds of time, as in the John Cage composition 4′33″ (spoken as "four thirty-three"), a composition that lasts exactly 4 minutes 33 seconds. This notation only applies to duration, and is seldom used for durations longer than 60 minutes.

== Use in mathematics, statistics, and science ==
In mathematics, the prime is generally used to generate more variable names for similar things without resorting to subscripts, with x′ generally meaning something related to (or derived from) x. For example, if a point is represented by the Cartesian coordinates (x, y), then that point rotated, translated or reflected might be represented as (x′, y′).

Usually, the meaning of x′ is defined when it is first used, but sometimes, its meaning is assumed to be understood:

- A derivative or differentiated function: in Lagrange's notation, f′(x) and f″(x) are the first and second derivatives of the function f(x) with respect to x. The pattern may be continued, such as in f ‴(x) and f ⁗(x), with each additional prime denoting the next higher derivative. Similarly, if y = f(x), then y′ and y″ denote the first and second derivatives of y with respect to x. Other notations for derivatives also exist (see Notation for differentiation).
- Set complement: A′ is the complement of the set A (other notations also exist).
- The negation of an event in probability theory: Pr(A′) = 1 − Pr(A) (other notations also exist).
- The result of a transformation: Tx = x′
- The transpose of a matrix (other notations also exist)
- The dual of a vector space

The prime is said to "decorate" the letter to which it applies. The same convention is adopted in functional programming, particularly in Haskell.

In geometry, geography and astronomy, prime and double prime are used as abbreviations for minute and second of arc (and thus latitude, longitude, elevation and right ascension).

In physics, the prime is used to denote variables after an event. For example, v_{A}′ may indicate the velocity of object A after an event. It is also commonly used in relativity: the event at (x, y, z, t) in frame S, has coordinates (x′, y′, z′, t′) in frame S′.

In chemistry, it is used to distinguish between different functional groups connected to an atom in a molecule, such as R and R′, representing different alkyl groups in an organic compound. The carbonyl carbon in proteins is denoted as C′, which distinguishes it from the other backbone carbon, the alpha carbon, which is denoted as C_{α}. In physical chemistry, it is used to distinguish between the lower state and the upper state of a quantum number during a transition. For example, J′ denotes the upper state of the quantum number J while J″ denotes the lower state of the quantum number J.

In molecular biology, the prime is used to denote the positions of carbon on a ring of deoxyribose or ribose. The prime distinguishes places on these two chemicals, rather than places on other parts of DNA or RNA, like phosphate groups or nucleic acids. Thus, when indicating the direction of movement of an enzyme along a string of DNA, biologists will say that it moves from the 5′ end to the 3′ end, because these carbons are on the ends of the DNA molecule. The chemistry of this reaction demands that the 3′ OH be extended by DNA synthesis. Prime can also be used to indicate which position a molecule has attached to, such as 5′-monophosphate.

== Use in linguistics ==
The prime can be used in the transliteration of some languages, such as Slavic languages, to denote palatalization. Prime and double prime are used to transliterate Cyrillic yeri (the soft sign, ь) and yer (the hard sign, ъ). In ISO 9, the corresponding modifier letters are used: U+02B9 ʹ MODIFIER LETTER PRIME for ь and U+02BA ʺ MODIFIER LETTER DOUBLE PRIME for ъ.

Originally, X-bar theory used a bar over syntactic units to indicate bar-levels in syntactic structure, generally rendered as an overbar. While easy to write, the bar notation proved difficult to typeset, leading to the adoption of the prime symbol to indicate a bar. (Despite the lack of bar, the unit would still be read as "X bar", as opposed to "X prime".) With contemporary development of typesetting software such as LaTeX, typesetting bars is considerably simpler; nevertheless, both prime and bar markups are accepted usages.

Some X-bar notations use a double prime (standing in for a double-bar) to indicate a phrasal level, indicated in most notations by "XP".

== Use in music ==
Prime, double prime and triple prime

The prime symbol is used in combination with lower case letters in the Helmholtz pitch notation system to distinguish notes in different octaves from middle C upwards. Thus c represents the ⟨C⟩ below middle C, c′ represents middle C, c″ represents the ⟨C⟩ in the octave above middle C, and c‴ the ⟨C⟩ in the octave two octaves above middle C. A combination of upper case letters and sub-prime symbols is used to represent notes in lower octaves. Thus C represents the ⟨C⟩ below the bass stave, while C ͵ represents the ⟨C⟩ in the octave below that.

The prime symbol is also used in the names of organ stops, which conventionally indicate pitch using the length in feet of the pipe corresponding to C_{2}, the lowest C on an organ manual two ledger lines below the bass clef. Concert pitch corresponds to 8′ stops, hence this naming convention is known as eight-foot pitch.

== Computer encodings ==
Unicode and HTML representations of the prime and related symbols are as follows.

- U+2032 ′ PRIME (&prime;) (lower case p)
- U+2033 ″ DOUBLE PRIME (&Prime;) (upper case P)
- U+2034 ‴ TRIPLE PRIME (&tprime;)
- U+2035 ‵ REVERSED PRIME (&backprime;, &bprime;)
- U+2036 ‶ REVERSED DOUBLE PRIME
- U+2037 ‷ REVERSED TRIPLE PRIME
- U+2057 ⁗ QUADRUPLE PRIME (&qprime;)
- U+02B9 ʹ MODIFIER LETTER PRIME
- U+02BA ʺ MODIFIER LETTER DOUBLE PRIME

The "modifier letter prime" and "modifier letter double prime" characters are treated in Unicode as letters rather than as punctuation marks. They are intended for linguistic purposes, such as the indication of forms of stress; to transliterate mjagkij znak (Cyrillic soft sign: palatalization) or tverdyj znak (Cyrillic hard sign: no palatalization) or the Hebrew geresh.

In a context when the character set used does not include the prime or double prime character (e.g., in an online discussion context where only ASCII or ISO 8859-1 [ISO Latin 1] is expected), they are often respectively approximated by ASCII apostrophe (U+0027 ' APOSTROPHE) or quotation mark (U+0022 " QUOTATION MARK).

LaTeX provides an oversized prime symbol, \prime ($\prime$), which, when used in super- or sub-scripts, renders appropriately; e.g., f_\prime^\prime appears as $f_\prime^\prime$. When in math mode, an apostrophe, ', is a shortcut for a superscript prime; e.g., f' appears as $f'\,\!$.

== See also ==
- Glossary of mathematical symbols
- List of typographical symbols and punctuation marks
- Rubik's Cube move notation, where the prime is used to invert moves or move sequences.
- Table of mathematical symbols by introduction date
- Typewriter conventions, conventions that stem from the typewriter's characteristics and limitations
