= Infinity symbol =

Mathematical symbol representing infinity

$\infty$o

Infinity symbol
- In Unicode: U+221E ∞ INFINITY (&infin;)

Different from
- Different from: U+267E ♾ PERMANENT PAPER SIGN; U+26AD ⚭ MARRIAGE SYMBOL; U+2180 ↀ ROMAN NUMERAL ONE THOUSAND C D

The infinity symbol (∞) is a mathematical symbol representing the concept of infinity. This symbol is also called a lemniscate, after the lemniscate curves of a similar shape studied in algebraic geometry, or "lazy eight", in the terminology of livestock branding.

This symbol was first used mathematically by John Wallis in the 17th century, although it has a longer history of other uses. In mathematics, it often refers to infinite processes (potential infinity) but may also refer to infinite values (actual infinity). It has other related technical meanings, such as the use of long-lasting paper in bookbinding, and has been used for its symbolic value of the infinite in modern mysticism and literature. It is a common element of graphic design, for instance in corporate logos as well as in earlier designs such as the Métis flag.

The infinity symbol and several variations of the symbol are available in various character encodings.

== History ==
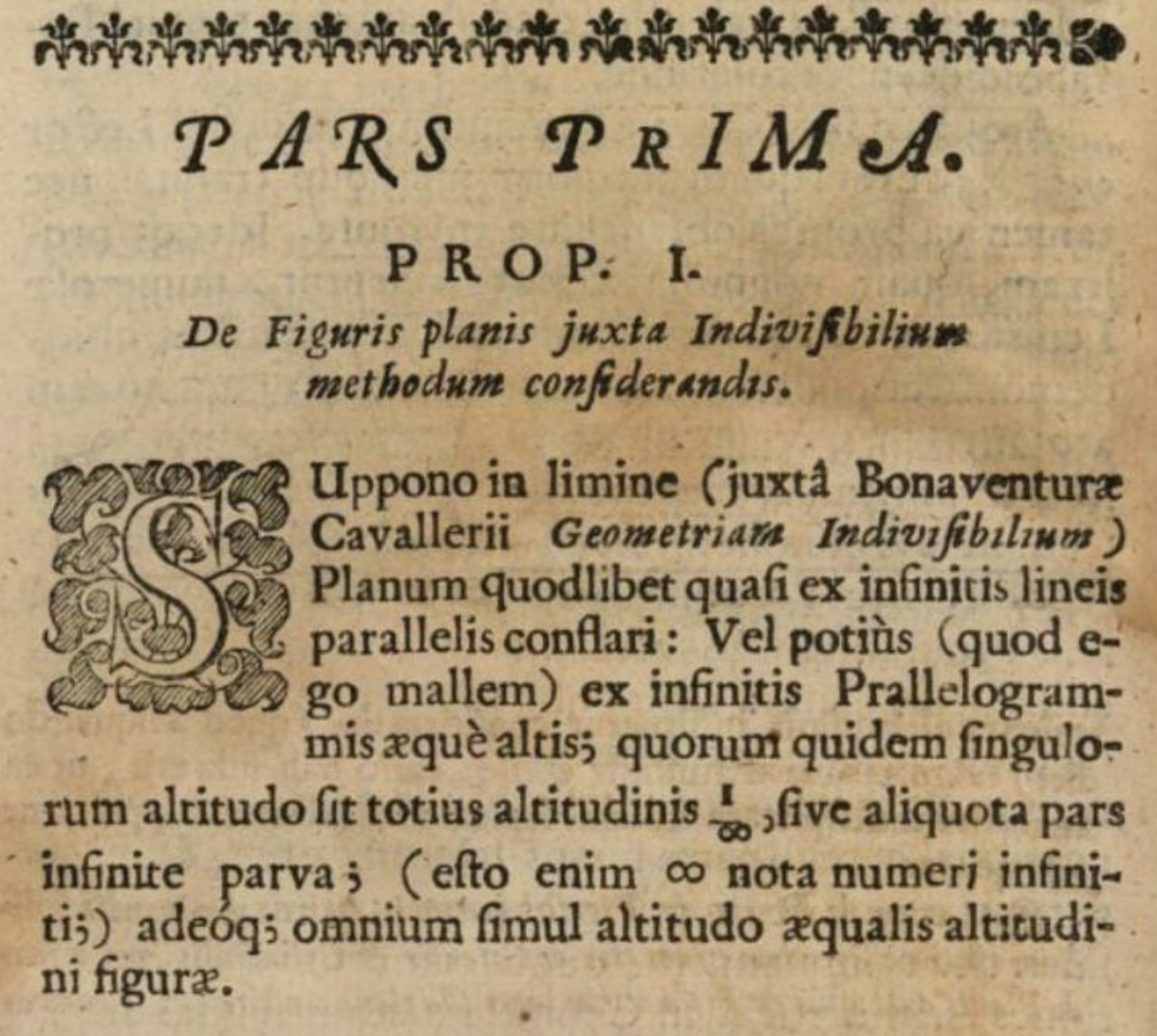
First known usage of the infinity symbol, by John Wallis in 1655

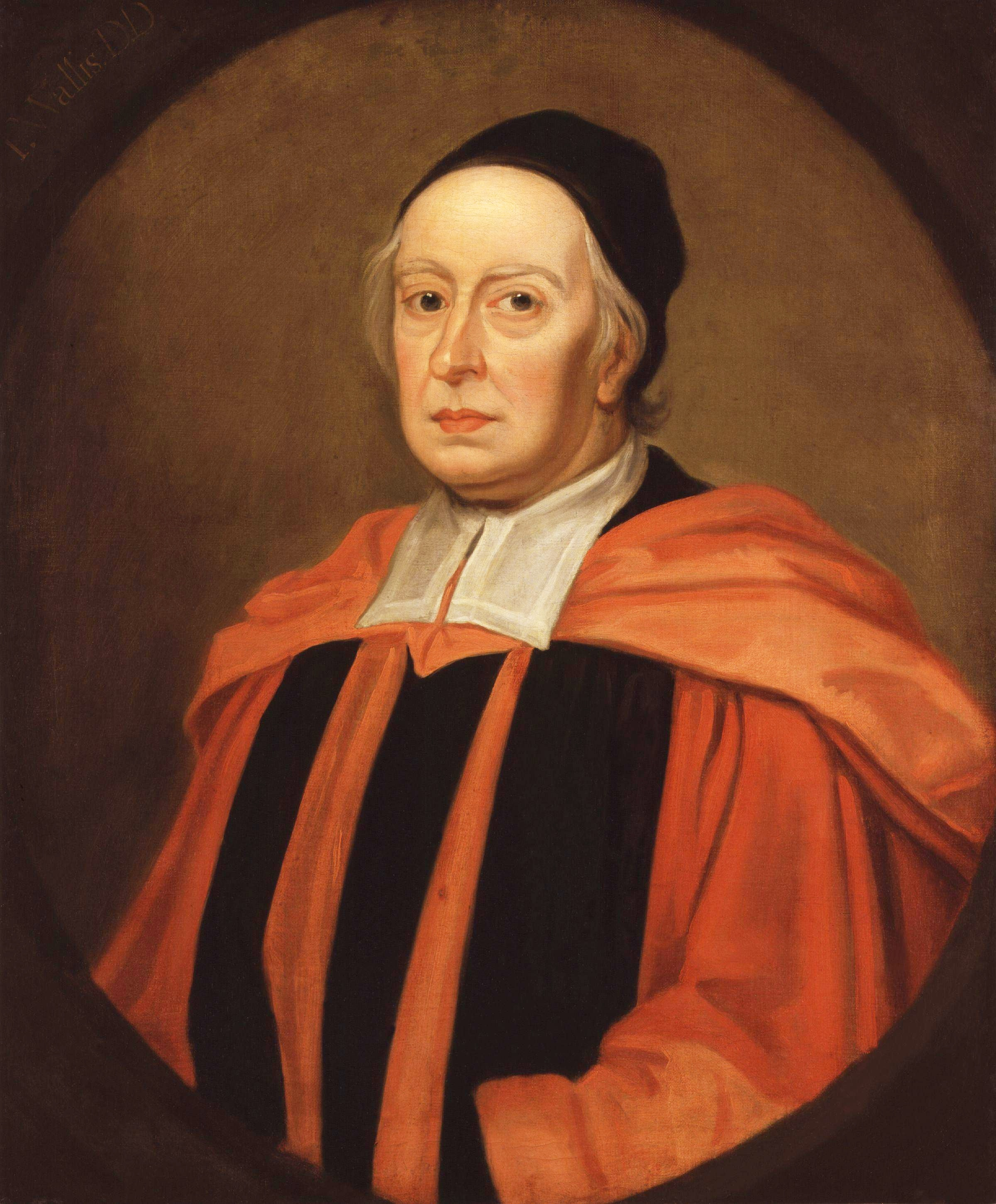
John Wallis in 1701

The lemniscate has been a common decorative motif since ancient times; for instance, it is commonly seen on Viking Age combs.

The English mathematician John Wallis is credited with introducing the infinity symbol with its mathematical meaning in 1655, in his De sectionibus conicis. Wallis did not explain his choice of this symbol. It has been conjectured to be a variant form of a Roman numeral, but which Roman numeral is unclear. One theory proposes that the infinity symbol was based on the numeral for 100 million, which resembled the same symbol enclosed within a rectangular frame. Another proposes instead that it was based on the notation CIↃ (alternatively reduced to ↀ) used to represent 1,000. Instead of a Roman numeral, it may alternatively be derived from a variant of ω, the lower-case form of omega, the last letter in the Greek alphabet.

Perhaps in some cases because of typographic limitations, other symbols resembling the infinity sign have been used for the same meaning. One paper by Leonhard Euler was typeset with an open letterform more closely resembling a reflected and sideways S than a lemniscate (something like S), and even "O–O" has been used as a stand-in for the infinity symbol itself.

== Usage ==
=== Mathematics ===
In mathematics, the infinity symbol is often used to represent a potential infinity. For instance, in mathematical expressions with summations and limits such as

$$\sum_{n=0}^{\infty} \frac{1}{2^n} = \lim_{x\to\infty}\frac{2^x-1}{2^{x-1}} = 2,$$

the infinity sign is conventionally interpreted as meaning that the variable grows arbitrarily large towards infinity, rather than actually taking an infinite value, although other interpretations are possible.

The infinity symbol may also be used in some contexts for an actual infinity, infinite entities taken as mathematical objects per se, especially when only a single infinite value is considered. In geometry and topology, the infinity symbol may be used to represent a point at infinity. This usage includes, in particular, the infinite point of a projective line, and the point added to a topological space to form its one-point compactification. In measure theory, the value of a measure is often taken as an extended real number, allowing $+\infty$ as a value; this usage allows sets of infinite measure to be distinguished from nonmeasurable sets. However, other notations are also used for some other kinds of infinite values. For example, $\aleph_0$ (aleph-nought) denotes the smallest infinite cardinal number (representing the size of the set of natural numbers), and $\omega$ (omega) denotes the smallest infinite ordinal number (representing the ordering of the natural numbers).

=== Other technical uses ===
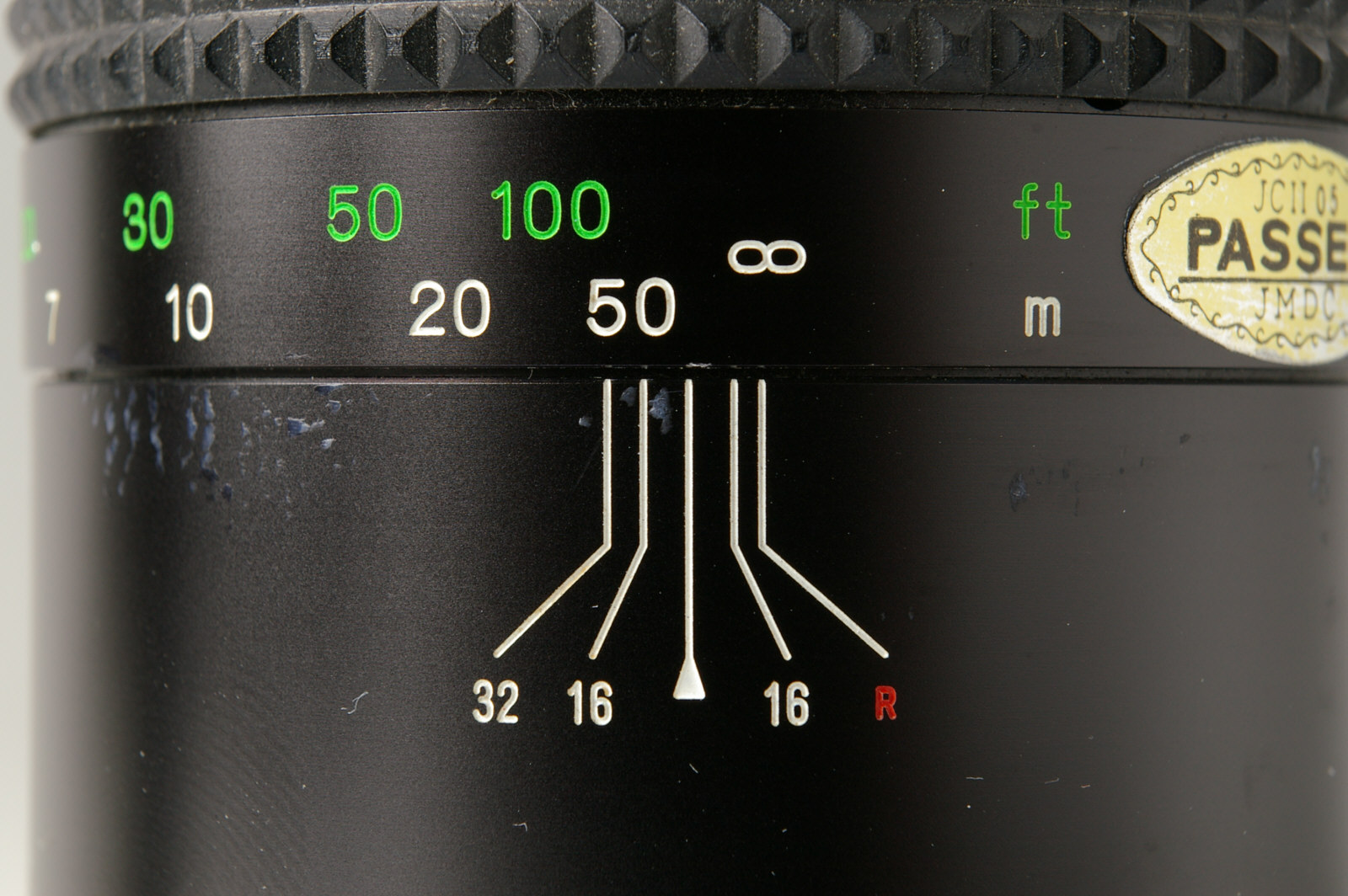
Side view of a camera lens, showing infinity symbol on the focal length indicator

In areas other than mathematics, the infinity symbol may take on other related meanings. For instance, it has been used in bookbinding to indicate that a book is printed on acid-free paper and will therefore be long-lasting. On cameras and their lenses, the infinity symbol indicates that the lens's focal length is set to an infinite distance, and is "probably one of the oldest symbols to be used on cameras".

=== Symbolism and literary uses ===
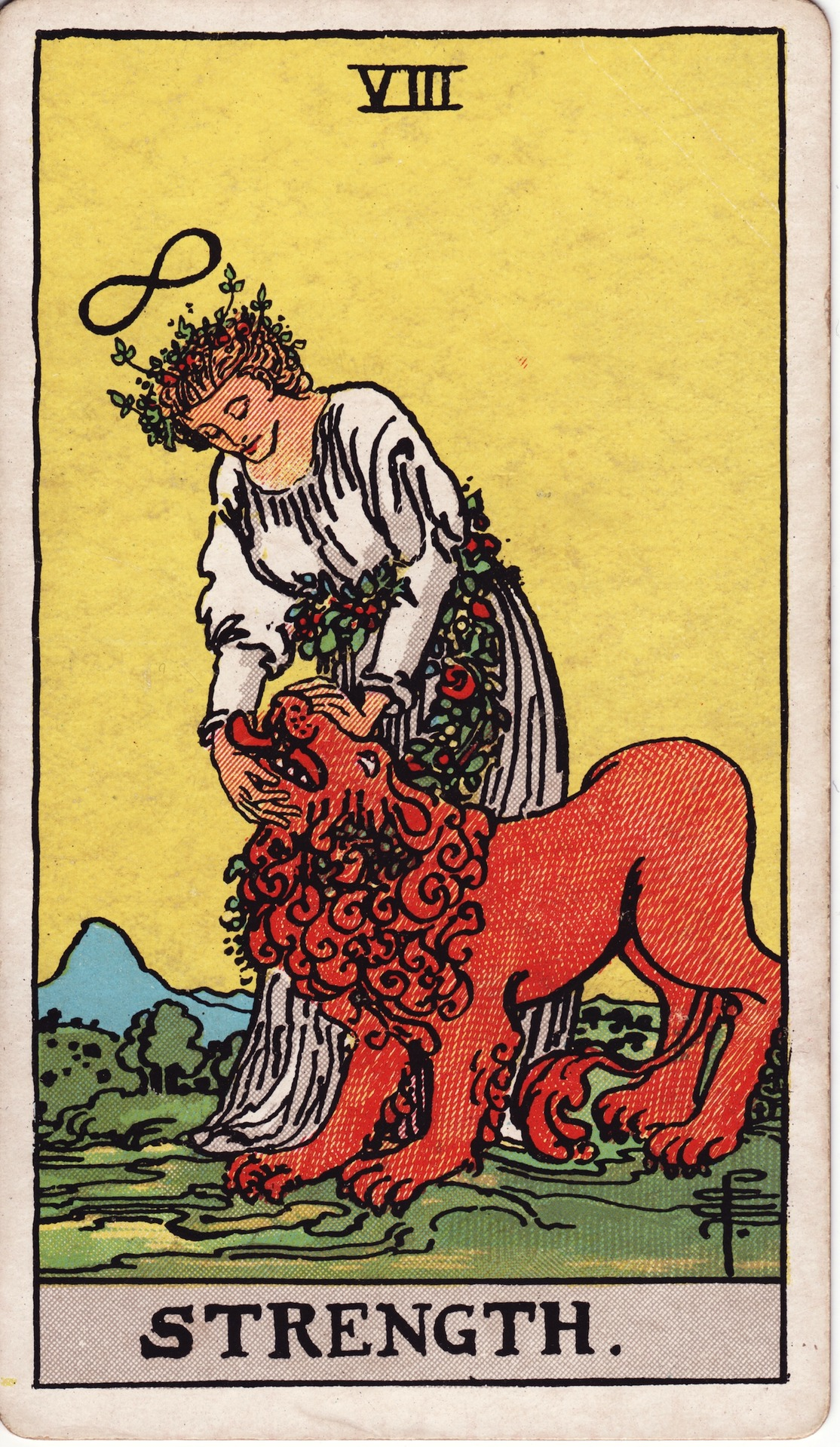
The infinity symbol appears on several cards of the Rider–Waite tarot deck.

In modern mysticism, the infinity symbol has become identified with a variation of the ouroboros, an ancient image of a snake eating its own tail that has also come to symbolize the infinite, and the ouroboros is sometimes drawn in figure-eight form to reflect this identification—rather than in its more traditional circular form.

In the works of Vladimir Nabokov, including The Gift and Pale Fire, the figure-eight shape is used symbolically to refer to the Möbius strip and the infinite, as is the case in these books' descriptions of the shapes of bicycle tire tracks and of the outlines of half-remembered people. Nabokov's poem after which he entitled Pale Fire explicitly refers to "the miracle of the lemniscate". Other authors whose works use this shape with its symbolic meaning of the infinite include James Joyce, in Ulysses, and David Foster Wallace, in Infinite Jest.

=== Graphic design ===
The well-known shape and meaning of the infinity symbol have made it a common typographic element of graphic design. For instance, the Métis flag, used by the Canadian Métis people since the early 19th century, is based around this symbol. Different theories have been put forward for the meaning of the symbol on this flag, including the hope for an infinite future for Métis culture and its mix of European and First Nations traditions, but also evoking the geometric shapes of Métic dances,, Celtic knots, or Plains First Nations Sign Language.

A rainbow-coloured infinity symbol is also used by the autism rights movement, as a way to symbolize the infinite variation of the people in the movement and of human cognition. The Bakelite company took up this symbol in its corporate logo to refer to the wide range of varied applications of the synthetic material they produced. Versions of this symbol have been used in other trademarks, corporate logos, and emblems including those of Fujitsu, Cell Press, and the 2022 FIFA World Cup.

== Encoding ==
The $\infty$ symbol in several typefaces

The symbol is encoded in Unicode at U+221E ∞ INFINITY and in LaTeX as \infty: $\infty$. An encircled version is encoded for use as a symbol for acid-free paper.

Character information
Preview	∞		♾	
Unicode name	INFINITY		PERMANENT PAPER SIGN	
Encodings	decimal	hex	dec	hex
Unicode	8734	U+221E	9854	U+267E
UTF-8	226 136 158	E2 88 9E	226 153 190	E2 99 BE
GB 18030	161 222	A1 DE	129 55 174 56	81 37 AE 38
Numeric character reference	&#8734;	&#x221E;	&#9854;	&#x267E;
Named character reference	&infin;			
OEM-437 (Alt Code)	236	EC		
Mac OS Roman	176	B0		
Symbol Font encoding	165	A5		
Shift JIS	129 135	81 87		
EUC-JP	161 231	A1 E7		
EUC-KR / UHC	161 196	A1 C4		
EUC-KPS-9566	162 172	A2 AC		
Big5	161 219	A1 DB		
LaTeX	\infty		\acidfree	
CLDR text-to-speech name	infinity sign		infinity	

The Unicode set of symbols also includes several variant forms of the infinity symbol that are less frequently available in fonts in the block Miscellaneous Mathematical Symbols-B.

Character information
Preview	⧜		⧝		⧞	
Unicode name	INCOMPLETE INFINITY		TIE OVER INFINITY		INFINITY NEGATED WITH VERTICAL BAR	
Encodings	decimal	hex	dec	hex	dec	hex
Unicode	10716	U+29DC	10717	U+29DD	10718	U+29DE
UTF-8	226 167 156	E2 A7 9C	226 167 157	E2 A7 9D	226 167 158	E2 A7 9E
Numeric character reference	&#10716;	&#x29DC;	&#10717;	&#x29DD;	&#10718;	&#x29DE;
Named character reference	&iinfin;		&infintie;		&nvinfin;	
LaTeX	\iinfin		\tieinfty		\nvinfty	

== See also ==
- Aleph number
- History of mathematical notation
- Lazy Eight (disambiguation)
