= Christoph Rudolff =

Author of the first German textbook on algebra

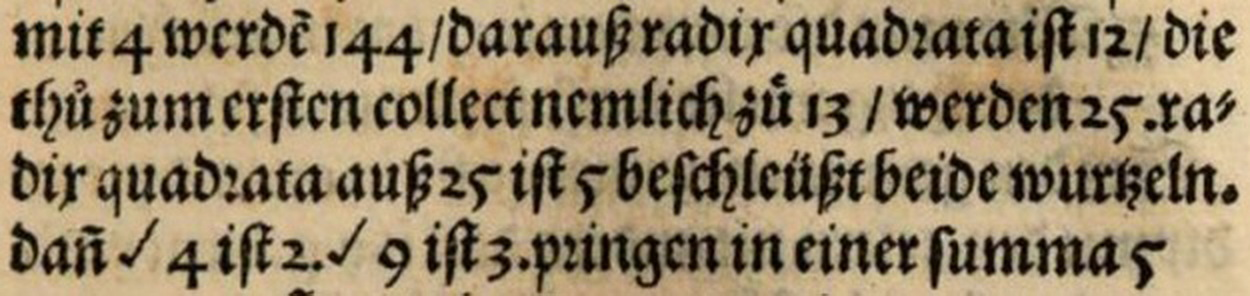

Christoph Rudolff (born 1499 in Jawor, Silesia, died 1545 in Vienna) was a German mathematician, the author of the first German textbook on algebra.

From 1517 to 1521, Rudolff was a student of Henricus Grammateus (Schreyber from Erfurt) at the University of Vienna and was the author of a book computing, under the title: Behend und hübsch Rechnung durch die kunstreichen regeln Algebre so gemeinicklich die Coss genent werden (Nimble and beautiful calculation via the artful rules of algebra [which] are so commonly called "coss").

He introduced the radical symbol (√) for the square root. It is believed that this was because it resembled a lowercase "r" (for "radix"), though there is no direct evidence. Florian Cajori only says that a "dot is the embryo of our present symbol for the square root" though it is 'possible, perhaps probable' that Rudolff's later symbols are not dots but 'r's.

Furthermore, he used the meaningful definition that x^{0} = 1.

== See also ==
- History of mathematical notation
