= Plus and minus signs =

Mathematical symbols (+ and −)

+ −o

Plus and minus signs
- In Unicode: U+002B + PLUS SIGN (&plus;); U+2212 − MINUS SIGN (&minus;)

Different from
- Different from: U+002D - HYPHEN-MINUS; U+2010 ‐ HYPHEN (many) – Dash

Related
- See also: U+00B1 ± PLUS-MINUS SIGN; U+2213 ∓ MINUS-OR-PLUS SIGN

The plus sign (+) and the minus sign (−) are mathematical symbols used to denote positive and negative functions, respectively. In addition, the symbol + represents the operation of addition, which results in a sum, while the symbol − represents subtraction, resulting in a difference. Their use has been extended to many other meanings, more or less analogous. Plus and minus are Latin terms meaning 'more' and 'less', respectively.

The forms + and − are used in many countries around the world. Other designs include U+FB29 ﬩ HEBREW LETTER ALTERNATIVE PLUS SIGN for plus and U+2052 ⁒ COMMERCIAL MINUS SIGN for minus.

== History ==
Though the signs now seem as familiar as the alphabet or the Arabic numerals, they are not of great antiquity. The Egyptian hieroglyphic sign for addition, for example, resembles a pair of legs walking in the direction in which the text was written (Egyptian could be written either from right to left or left to right), with the reverse sign indicating subtraction:

D54 or D55

Nicole Oresme's manuscripts from the 14th century show what may be one of the earliest uses of + as a sign for plus.

In early 15th century Europe, the letters "P" and "M" were generally used. The symbols (P with overline, p̄, for più (more), i.e., plus, and M with overline, m̄, for meno (less), i.e., minus) appeared for the first time in Luca Pacioli's mathematics compendium, Summa de arithmetica, geometria, proportioni et proportionalità, first printed and published in Venice in 1494.

The + sign is a simplification of the Latin: et (comparable to the evolution of the ampersand &). The − may be derived from a macron ◌̄ written over ⟨m⟩ when used to indicate subtraction; or it may come from a shorthand version of the letter ⟨m⟩ itself.

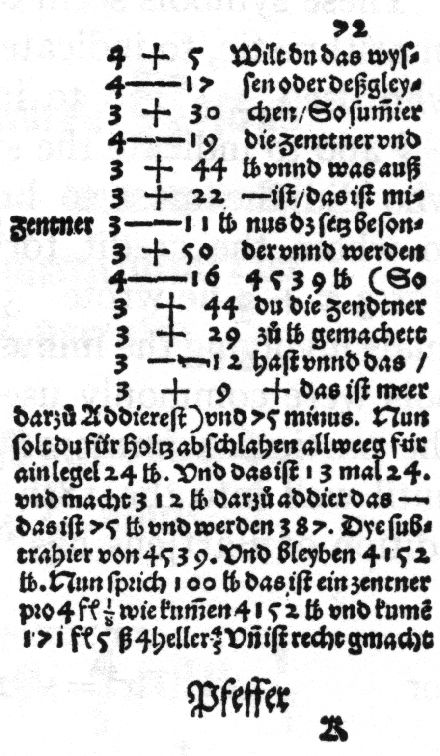
From Johannes Widmann's book on "handy and pretty arithmetic for all merchants"

In his 1489 treatise, Johannes Widmann referred to the symbols − and + as minus and mer (Modern German mehr; "more"): "[...] was − ist das ist minus [...] und das + das ist mer das zu addirst". They were not used for addition and subtraction in the treatise, but were used to indicate surplus and deficit; usage in the modern sense is attested in a 1518 book by Henricus Grammateus.

Robert Recorde, the designer of the equals sign, introduced plus and minus to Britain in 1557 in The Whetstone of Witte: "There be other 2 signes in often use of which the first is made thus + and betokeneth more: the other is thus made − and betokeneth lesse."

== Plus sign ==
The plus sign (+) is a binary operator that indicates addition, as in 2 + 3 = 5. It can also serve as an unary operator that leaves its operand unchanged (+x means the same as x). This notation may be used when it is desired to emphasize the positiveness of a number, especially in contrast with the negative numbers (+5 versus −5).

The plus sign can also indicate many other operations, depending on the mathematical system under consideration. Many algebraic structures, such as vector spaces and matrix rings, have some operation which is called, or is equivalent to, addition. It is though conventional to use the plus sign to only denote commutative operations.

The symbol is also used in chemistry and physics. For more, see § Other uses.

== Minus sign ==
The minus sign (−) has three main uses in mathematics:

1. The subtraction operator: a binary operator to indicate the operation of subtraction, as in 5 − 3 = 2. Subtraction is the inverse of addition.
2. The additive inverse operator: an unary operator to indicate the function whose value for any real or complex argument is the additive inverse of that argument. For example, if x = 3, then −x = −3, but if x = −3, then −x = +3. Similarly, −(−x) = x.
3. A prefix of a numeric constant. When it is placed immediately before an unsigned number, the combination names a negative number, the additive inverse of the positive number that the numeral would otherwise name.

In many contexts, it does not matter whether the second or the third of these usages is intended: −5 is the same number. When it is important to distinguish them, a raised minus sign (¯) is sometimes used for negative constants, as in elementary education, the programming language APL, and some early graphing calculators. (Note: at least the early Texas Instruments models, including the TI-81 and TI-82)

All three uses can be referred to as "minus" in everyday speech, though the binary operator is sometimes read as "take away". In American English nowadays, −5 (for example) is generally referred to as "negative five" though speakers born before 1950 often refer to it as "minus five". (Temperatures tend to follow the older usage; −5° is generally called "minus five degrees", though both forms are seen.) Further, a few textbooks in the United States encourage −x to be read as "the opposite of x" or "the additive inverse of x"—to avoid giving the impression that −x is necessarily negative (since x itself may already be negative).

In mathematics and most programming languages, the rules for the order of operations mean that −5^{2} is equal to −25: Exponentiation binds more strongly than the unary minus, which binds more strongly than multiplication or division. However, in some programming languages (Microsoft Excel in particular), unary operators bind strongest, so in those cases −5^2 is 25, but 0−5^2 is −25.

Similar to the plus sign, the minus sign is also used in chemistry and physics. (For more, see § Other uses below.)

== Use in elementary education ==
Some elementary teachers use raised minus signs before numbers to disambiguate them from the operation of subtraction. The same convention is also used in some computer languages. For example, subtracting −5 from 3 might be read as "positive three take away negative 5", and be shown as

3 − ^{−}5 becomes 3 + 5 = 8,

which can be read as:

^{+}3 −1(^{−}5)

or even as

^{+}3 − ^{−}5 becomes ^{+}3 + ^{+}5 = ^{+}8.

== Use as a qualifier ==
When placed after a number, a plus sign can indicate an open range of numbers. For example, "18+" is commonly used as shorthand for "ages 18 and up" although "eighteen plus", for example, is now common usage.

In US grading systems, the plus sign indicates a grade one level higher and the minus sign a grade lower. For example, B− ("B minus") is one grade lower than B. In some occasions, this is extended to two plus or minus signs (e.g., A++ being two grades higher than A).

A common trend in branding, particularly with streaming video services, has been the use of the plus sign at the end of brand names, e.g. Google+, Disney+, Paramount+, and Apple TV+. Since the word "plus" can mean an advantage, or an additional amount of something, such "+" signs imply that a product offers extra features or benefits.

Positive and negative are sometimes abbreviated as +ve and −ve, and on batteries and cell terminals are often marked with + and −.

=== Mathematics ===
In mathematics the one-sided limit x → a^{+} means x approaches a from the right (i.e., right-sided limit), and x → a^{−} means x approaches a from the left (i.e., left-sided limit). For example, $\frac{1}{x} \rarr +\infty$ as x → 0^{+} but $\frac{1}{x} \rarr -\infty$ as x → 0^{−}.

When placed after special sets of numbers, plus and minus signs are used to indicate that only positive numbers and negative numbers are included, respectively. For example, $\mathbb{Z}^+$ is the set of all positive integers and $\mathbb{Z}^-$ is the set of all negative integers. In these cases, a subscript 0 may also be added to clarify that 0 is included.

=== Blood ===
Blood types are often qualified with a plus or minus to indicate the presence or absence of the Rh factor. For example, A+ means type A blood with the Rh factor present, while B− means type B blood with the Rh factor absent.

=== Music ===
In music, augmented chords are symbolized with a plus sign, although this practice is not universal (as there are other methods for spelling those chords). For example, "C+" is read "C augmented chord". Sometimes the plus is written as a superscript.

== Uses in computing ==
As well as the normal mathematical usage, plus and minus signs may be used for a number of other purposes in computing.

Plus and minus signs are often used in tree view on a computer screen—to show if a folder is collapsed or not.

In some programming languages, concatenation of strings is written "a" + "b", and results in "ab".

In most programming languages, subtraction and negation are indicated with the ASCII hyphen-minus character, -. In APL a raised minus sign (here written using U+00AF ¯ MACRON) is used to denote a negative number, as in ¯3. While in J a negative number is denoted by an underscore, as in _5.

In C and some other computer programming languages, two plus signs indicate the increment operator and two minus signs a decrement; the position of the operator before or after the variable indicates whether the new or old value is read from it. For example, if x equals 6, then y = x++ increments x to 7 but sets y to 6, whereas y = ++x would set both x and y to 7. By extension, ++ is sometimes used in computing terminology to signify an improvement, as in the name of the language C++.

In regular expressions, + is often used to indicate "1 or more" in a pattern to be matched. For example, x+ means "one or more of the letter x". This is the Kleene plus notation. Hyphen-minus usually indicates a range ([A-Z] - any capital from 'A' to 'Z'), although it can stand for itself ([ABCDE-] any capital from 'A' to 'E' or '-').

There is no concept of negative zero in mathematics, but in computing −0 may have a separate representation from zero. In the IEEE floating-point standard, 1 / −0 is negative infinity ($-\infty$) whereas 1 / 0 is positive infinity ($\infty$).

+ is also used to denote added lines in diff output in the context format or the unified format.

== Other uses ==
=== Minus ===
- Dan/Godié/Karaboro/Krumen/Mwan/Nyabwa/Wan/Wè/Yaouré Languages: Tone letter in the orthographies of Dan, Krumen, Karaboro, Mwan, Wan, Yaouré, Wè, Nyabwa, and Godié. The Unicode character used for the tone letter (U+02D7 ˗ MODIFIER LETTER MINUS SIGN) is different from the mathematical minus sign.

=== Plus ===
- Botanical names: A plus sign denotes graft-chimaera.
- Catholicism: The plus sign before a last name denotes a Bishop, and a double plus is used to denote an Archbishop.
- Chess: In the algebraic notation used to record games of chess, the plus sign + is used to denote a move that puts the opponent into check, while a double plus ++ is sometimes used to denote double check. Combinations of the plus and minus signs are used to evaluate a move (+/−, +/=, =/+, −/+).
- Huichol Language: The plus sign sometimes represents /ɨ/ in the orthography of Huichol.
- Linguistics: A superscript plus ^{+} sometimes replaces the asterisk, which denotes unattested linguistic reconstruction.
- Telephone numbers: When prefixed to a telephone number + is used to indicate the form used for International Direct Dialing. Its precise usage varies by technology and national standards.

=== Plus and minus ===
- Chemistry: Superscripted plus and minus signs are used to indicate an ion with a positive or negative charge of 1 (e.g., NH+
  4 ). If the charge is greater than 1, a number indicating the charge is written before the sign (as in SO2−
  4 ).
- International Phonetic Alphabet: subscripted plus and minus signs are used as diacritics to indicate advanced or retracted articulations of speech sounds.
- Physics: The use of plus and minus signs for different electrical charges was introduced by Georg Christoph Lichtenberg.

== Unicode ==
+ −o

hyphen-minus, plus, minus signs compared

Variants of the symbols have unique codepoints in Unicode:

- U+002B + PLUS SIGN (&plus;)
- U+002D - HYPHEN-MINUS
- U+00B1 ± PLUS-MINUS SIGN (&plusmn;, &PlusMinus;, &pm;)
- U+02D6 ˖ MODIFIER LETTER PLUS SIGN
- U+02D7 ˗ MODIFIER LETTER MINUS SIGN
- U+2052 ⁒ COMMERCIAL MINUS SIGN
- U+2064 INVISIBLE PLUS (a contiguity operator indicating addition)
- U+207A ⁺ SUPERSCRIPT PLUS SIGN
- U+207B ⁻ SUPERSCRIPT MINUS
- U+208A ₊ SUBSCRIPT PLUS SIGN
- U+208B ₋ SUBSCRIPT MINUS
- U+2212 − MINUS SIGN (&minus;)
- U+2213 ∓ MINUS-OR-PLUS SIGN (&MinusPlus;, &mnplus;, &mp;)
- U+2238 ∸ DOT MINUS
- U+228E ⊎ MULTISET UNION (&UnionPlus;, &uplus;)
- U+2795 ➕ HEAVY PLUS SIGN
- U+2796 ➖ HEAVY MINUS SIGN
- U+293C ⤼ TOP ARC CLOCKWISE ARROW WITH MINUS
- U+293D ⤽ TOP ARC ANTICLOCKWISE ARROW WITH PLUS
- U+29FA ⧺ DOUBLE PLUS
- U+29FB ⧻ TRIPLE PLUS
- U+29FE ⧾ TINY
- U+29FF ⧿ MINY
- U+2A22 ⨢ PLUS SIGN WITH SMALL CIRCLE ABOVE
- U+2A23 ⨣ PLUS SIGN WITH CIRCUMFLEX ACCENT ABOVE
- U+2A24 ⨤ PLUS SIGN WITH TILDE ABOVE
- U+2A25 ⨥ PLUS SIGN WITH DOT BELOW
- U+2A26 ⨦ PLUS SIGN WITH TILDE BELOW
- U+2A27 ⨧ PLUS SIGN WITH SUBSCRIPT TWO
- U+2A28 ⨨ PLUS SIGN WITH BLACK TRIANGLE
- U+2A29 ⨩ MINUS SIGN WITH COMMA ABOVE
- U+2A2A ⨪ MINUS SIGN WITH DOT BELOW
- U+2A2B ⨫ MINUS SIGN WITH FALLING DOTS
- U+2A2C ⨬ MINUS SIGN WITH RISING DOTS
- U+2A2D ⨭ PLUS SIGN IN LEFT HALF CIRCLE
- U+2A2E ⨮ PLUS SIGN IN RIGHT HALF CIRCLE
- U+2A41 ⩁ UNION WITH MINUS SIGN
- U+FB29 ﬩ HEBREW LETTER ALTERNATIVE PLUS SIGN
- U+FE62 ﹢ SMALL PLUS SIGN
- U+FE63 ﹣ SMALL HYPHEN-MINUS
- U+FF0B ＋ FULLWIDTH PLUS SIGN
- U+FF0D － FULLWIDTH HYPHEN-MINUS

== Alternative plus sign ==

A Jewish tradition that dates from at least the 19th century is to write plus using the symbol ﬩, to avoid the writing of a symbol + that could look like a Christian cross. This practice was adopted into Israeli schools and was still commonplace as of 1986 in elementary schools (including secular schools) but in fewer secondary schools. It is also used occasionally in books by religious authors, but most books for adults use the international symbol +. Unicode has this symbol at position U+FB29 ﬩ HEBREW LETTER ALTERNATIVE PLUS SIGN. This form of the plus sign is also used on the control buttons at individual seats on board the El Al Israel Airlines aircraft.

== Alternative minus signs ==
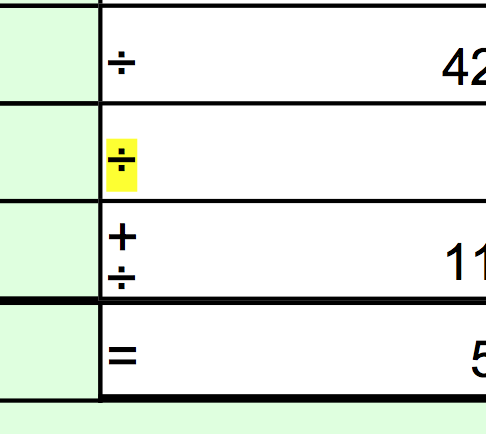
"÷" being used as a minus sign (not as a division sign) in an excerpt from an official Norwegian trading statement form called «Næringsoppgave 1» for the taxation year 2010

There is a commercial minus sign, ⁒, which is (or was) used in Germany and Scandinavia. The symbol ÷, still used in many Anglophone countries as a division sign, is (or was) used to denote subtraction in Scandinavia.

The hyphen-minus symbol (-) is the form of hyphen most commonly used in digital documents. On most keyboards, it is the only character that resembles a minus sign or a dash so it is also used for these. The name hyphen-minus derives from the original ASCII standard, where it was called hyphen–(minus). The character is referred to as a hyphen, a minus sign, or a dash according to the context where it is being used.

== See also ==
- En dash, a dash that looks similar to the subtraction symbol but is used for different purposes
- Glossary of mathematical symbols
- ⊕ (disambiguation)
