= Gerhard Kowalewski =

German mathematician (1876–1950)

- Born: 27 March 1876; Alt Järshagen, German Empire
- Died: 21 February 1950 (aged 73); Gräfelfing, West Germany
- Education: University of Leipzig
- Scientific career
- Fields: Mathematics
- Doctoral advisor: Sophus Lie; Gustav Mayer
- Doctoral students: Alwin Walther

Gerhard Kowalewski (27 March 1876 – 21 February 1950) was a German mathematician who introduced the matrices notation.

== Early life ==
Waldemar Hermann Gerhard Kowalewski was born on March 27, 1876, in Alt Järshagen in Pomerania, then part of the German Empire. He was the son of Julius Leonard Kowalewski, a school teacher. In 1893 he left home to attend the University of Königsberg where his brother Christian Kowalewski was a professor of philosophy and mathematics. There he studied mathematics and philosophy before enrolling at the University of Greifswald, before eventually settling at the University of Leipzig, where he earned his doctorate with the thesis Über eine Kategorie von Transformationsgruppen einer vierdimensionalen Mannigfaltigkeit in 1898. At Leipzig he was a student of Sophus Lie, where he was considered one of Lie's most elite and gifted students.

== Academia ==
In 1901 he became an associate professor at the University of Greifswald before moving on to the University of Bonn in 1904. In 1909 he left for Prague to assume an appointment to a German-based school, before taking a position with the German University of Prague in 1912. From there he took a position at the Technical University of Dresden, culminating in his appointment as Rector in 1935. During 1937—1941, he was an editor of the journal Deutsche Mathematik. In 1937 he requested leave and was granted such from the Reich Ministry of Education. He returned to the German University of Prague in 1939 where he held a position until 1945, which following the expulsion of Germans following the war, fled to Munich where he established himself at the Technical University of Munich.

== Legacy ==
Kowalewski is known for the introduction of the matrices notation in 1909 with his work titled Determinantentheorie. He researched theories of determinants, transformation groups, natural and differential geometry, and approximation and interpolation, publishing over 100 works, including Vorlesungen über natürliche Geometrie, the German translation of Ernesto Cesàro's work, Das Integral und seine geometrischen Anwendungen in 1910, Über Bolzanos Nichtdifferenzierbare Stetige Funktion, Der Keplersche Korper und andere Bauspiele in 1938, and his memoir in 1950, Bestand und Wandel, as well as 24 mathematical textbooks. He was awarded the Lobachevsky Diploma in 1927.

Kowalewski was a member of the Saxon Academy of Sciences, the Société Mathématique de France, and socially associated with members of the Louvre Circle and Prague intellectual elite, which included Berta Fanta, Oskar Kraus, Franz Kafka, Hugo Bergmann, Philipp Frank, Albert Einstein, and Christian von Ehrenfels.

Kowalewski died in 1950 in Gräfelfing.

=== Nazi party membership ===
Kowalewski was a member of the Nazi party, who said about Adolf Hitler that "he has been sent to us by Providence." This helped him secure his position as Rector at the Technical University of Dresden.
