= Division sign =

Mathematical symbol

÷o

Division sign
- In Unicode: U+00F7 ÷ DIVISION SIGN (&divide;, &div;)

Different from
- Different from: U+2052 ⁒ COMMERCIAL MINUS SIGN

Related
- See also: U+002F / SOLIDUS U+2044 / FRACTION SLASH U+2215 ∕ DIVISION SLASH

The division sign (÷) is a mathematical symbol consisting of a short horizontal line with a dot above and another dot below, used in Anglophone countries to indicate the operation of division. This usage is not universal and the symbol has different meanings in other countries. Consequently, its use to denote division is deprecated in the ISO 80000-2 standard for notations used in mathematics, science and technology. In older textbooks, it is called an obelus, though that term is also used of other symbols.

== In mathematics ==
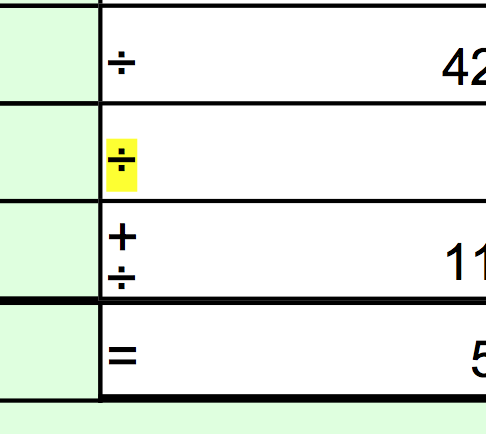
An obelus being used as a sign of subtraction in this excerpt from an official Norwegian trading statement form called «Næringsoppgave 1» used for tax purposes.

The obelus, a historical grapheme consisting of a horizontal line with (or without) one or more dots, was first used as a symbol for division in 1659, in the algebra book Teutsche Algebra by Johann Rahn, although previous writers had used the same symbol for subtraction. Some near-contemporaries believed that John Pell, who edited the book, may have been responsible for this use of the symbol. Other symbols for division include the slash or solidus /, the colon :, and the fraction bar (the horizontal bar in a vertical fraction). The ISO 80000-2 standard for mathematical notation in science and technology recommends only the solidus / or "fraction bar" for division, or the "colon" : for ratios; it says that the ÷ sign "should not be used" for division. Nevertheless, ÷ continues to be used on scientific calculators.

In Italy, Poland and Russia, the same ÷ sign was sometimes used to denote a range of values, and in Scandinavian countries it was, and sometimes still is, used as a negation sign: the Unicode Consortium has allocated a separate code point, U+2052 ⁒ COMMERCIAL MINUS SIGN for this usage uniquely; the exact form of the symbol displayed is typeface (font) dependent.

== In computer systems ==
=== Encoding ===
The symbol was assigned to code point 0xF7 in ISO 8859-1, as the "division sign". This encoding was transferred to Unicode as U+00F7.

Unicode provides various division symbols:

- U+002F / SOLIDUS (&sol;)
- U+00F7 ÷ DIVISION SIGN (&divide;, &div;)
- U+2215 ∕ DIVISION SLASH
- U+2298 ⊘ CIRCLED DIVISION SLASH (&osol;)
- U+22C7 ⋇ DIVISION TIMES (&divideontimes;, &divonx;)
- U+2797 ➗ HEAVY DIVISION SIGN
- U+27CC ⟌ LONG DIVISION
- U+29BC ⦼ CIRCLED ANTICLOCKWISE-ROTATED DIVISION SIGN (&odsold;)
- U+2A38 ⨸ CIRCLED DIVISION SIGN (&odiv;)

=== Use ===
Most programming languages use only the ASCII character set, and so do not use the U+00F7 ÷ DIVISION SIGN character. However, the programming language APL uses it for the unary reciprocal operator and the binary division operator.

== See also ==
- Plus and minus signs
- Multiplication sign
- Order of operations § Mixed division and multiplication
