= Robert Recorde =

Welsh mathematician and inventor of the equals sign

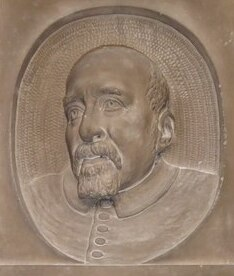
- Robert Recorde (c.1512–1558)
- Born: c. 1510; Tenby, Pembrokeshire, Wales
- Died: June 1558 (age 47 or 48); London, England
- Education: University of Oxford; University of Cambridge
- Known for: Inventing the equals sign (=)
- Scientific career
- Fields: Physician and mathematician
- Institutions: University of Oxford; Royal Mint

Robert Recorde (c. 1510 – 1558) was a Welsh physician and mathematician. He invented the equals sign (=) and also introduced the pre-existing plus (+) and minus (−) signs to English speakers in 1557.

== Biography ==
Born around 1510, Robert Recorde was the second and last son of Thomas and Rose Recorde of Tenby, Pembrokeshire, in Wales.

Recorde entered the University of Oxford about 1525, and was elected a Fellow of All Souls College there in 1531. Having adopted medicine as a profession, he went to the University of Cambridge to take the degree of M.D. in 1545. He afterwards returned to Oxford, where he publicly taught mathematics, as he had done prior to going to Cambridge. He invented the "equals" sign, which consists of two horizontal parallel lines, stating that no two things can be more equal. It appears that he afterwards went to London, and acted as physician to King Edward VI and to Queen Mary I, to whom some of his books are dedicated. He was also controller of the Royal Mint and served as Comptroller of Mines and Monies in Ireland. After being sued for defamation by a political enemy, he was arrested for debt and died in the King's Bench Prison, Southwark, by the middle of June 1558.

== Publications ==
The first known equation, equivalent to 14x + 15 = 71 in modern notation, from The Whetstone of Witte. (The solution is x = 4)

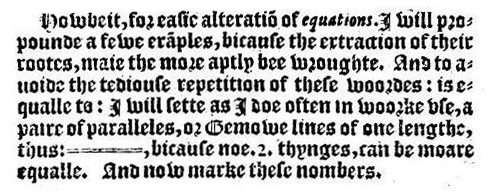
Recorde's introduction of the equals sign in The Whetstone of Witte, "to avoid tedious repetition".

Recorde published several works upon mathematical and medical subjects, chiefly in the form of dialogue between master and scholar, such as the following:

- The Grounde of Artes, teachings the Worke and Practise, of Arithmeticke, both in whole numbers and fractions (1543), the first English language book on algebra.
- The Pathway to Knowledge, containing the First Principles of Geometry ... bothe for the use of Instrumentes Geometricall and Astronomicall, and also for Projection of Plattes (London, 1551)
- The Castle of Knowledge, containing the Explication of the Sphere both Celestiall and Materiall, etc. (London, 1556) A book explaining Ptolemaic astronomy while mentioning the Copernican heliocentric model in passing.
- The Whetstone of Witte, whiche is the seconde parte of Arithmeteke: containing thextraction of rootes; the cossike practise, with the rule of equation; and the workes of Surde Nombers (London, 1557). This was the book in which the equals sign was introduced within a printed edition. With the publication of this book Recorde is credited with introducing algebra into the Island of Britain with a systematic notation.
- A medical work, The Urinal of Physick (1548), frequently reprinted.

Most of those works were written in the form of a catechism. Several books whose authors are unknown have been attributed to him: Cosmographiae isagoge, De Arte faciendi Horologium and De Usu Globorum et de Statu temporum.

== See also ==
- Equality
- Equation
- History of mathematical notation
- St. Mary's Church, Tenby
- Welsh mathematicians
- Zenzizenzizenzic – a word to describe a number to the eighth power coined by Robert Recorde
