= Johannes Widmann =

German mathematician (c. 1460 – c. 1498)

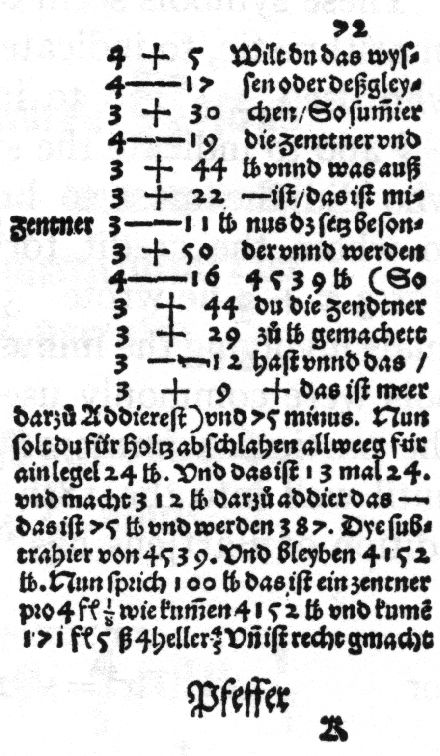
- The first use of the plus and minus signs in print
- Born: c. 1460; Eger, Holy Roman Empire
- Died: after 1498; Leipzig
- Education: University of Leipzig
- Known for: Plus and minus signs, first university lecture on algebra
- Scientific career
- Fields: Mathematics
- Workplaces: University of Leipzig

Johannes Widmann (c. 1460 – after 1498) was a German mathematician. The + and - symbols first appeared in print in his book Mercantile Arithmetic or Behende und hüpsche Rechenung auff allen Kauffmanschafft published in Leipzig in 1489 in reference to surpluses and deficits in business problems.

Born in Eger, Bohemia, Widmann attended the University of Leipzig in the 1480s. In 1482 he earned his "Baccalaureus" (Bachelor of Art degree) and in 1485 his "Magister" (doctorate).

Widman published Behende und hübsche Rechenung auff allen Kauffmanschafft (German; i.e. Nimble and neat calculation in all trades), his work making use of the signs, in Leipzig in 1489. Further editions were published in Pforzheim, Hagenau, and Augsburg. Handwritten entries in a surviving collection show that after earning his "Magister" Widman announced holding lectures on e.g. calculating on the lines of a calculating board and on algebra. There is evidence that the lecture on algebra actually took place, making it the first known university lecture on this topic.

Around 1495 Widmann published the Latin writings Algorithmus integrorum cum probis annexis, Algorithmus linealis, Algorithmus minutiarum phisicarum, Algorithmus minutiarum vulgarium, Regula falsi apud philosophantes augmenti et decrementi appellata und Tractatus proportionum plusquam aureus.

He died in Leipzig.

When Adam Ries was in Erfurt between 1518 and 1522 he got to know Widmann's algebra lecture script (today in the Saxon State Library) wherefrom he took examples for his own writings.

== Sources ==
- Barbara Gärtner, Johannes Widmanns „Behende und hübsche Rechenung“. Die Textsorte „Rechenbuch“ in der Frühen Neuzeit, Tübingen 2000. (Germanistische Linguistik. 222.)
- M. Cantor, Vorlesungen über Geschichte der Mathematik II (Leipzig, 1913), pp. 228s.
- K. Fogel, Merchants' aids in practical arithmetic from the Middle Ages (Russian), Istor.-Mat. Issled. No. 23 (1978), pp. 235–249; 359.
- W. Kaunzner and H. Wussing (eds.), Adam Ries, Coss (B.G. Teubner Verlagsgesellschaft mbH, Stuttgart, 1992).
- Karl Röttel, Johannes Widmann – Am Wendepunkt der Mathematikgeschichte. In: Schatzkammer der Rechenkunst. Annaberg-Buchholz 2008.
- K. Vogel, Biography in Dictionary of Scientific Biography (New York 1970–1990).
- Franz Xaver Wilhelm, Zur Biographie des Mathematikers Johann Widmann von Eger. In: Mitteilungen des Vereins für Geschichte der Deutschen in Böhmen, Volume 45 (1907), pp. 429–430.
