= Group =

A group is a number of persons or things that are located, gathered, or classed together.

Group may also refer to:

== Groups of people ==
- Ethnographic group, a group whose members share the same cultural identity
- Ethnic group, a group whose members share the same ethnic identity
- Religious group (disambiguation), a group whose members share the same religious identity
- Social group, a group whose members share the same social identity
- Tribal group, a group whose members share the same tribal identity
- Organization, an entity that has a collective goal and is linked to an external environment
- Peer group, an entity of three or more people with similar age, ability, experience, and interest
- Class (education), a group of people which attends a specific course or lesson at an educational institution

== Philosophy and religion ==
- Khandha, a Buddhist concept of five material and mental factors that take part in the rise of craving and clinging

== Science and technology ==
=== Chemistry ===
- Functional group, a group of atoms which provide some property to a molecule
- Group (periodic table), a column in the periodic table of chemical elements

=== Computing and the Internet ===
- Group (computing), a collection of users or other objects
- Group (database)
- Group (online social networking)
- Usenet newsgroup
- Google Groups
- Yahoo! Groups
- Facebook groups

=== Mathematics ===
- Group (mathematics), a set together with a binary operation satisfying certain algebraic conditions

=== Social science ===
- In-group and out-group
- Primary, secondary, and reference groups
- Social group
- Collectives

=== Other uses in science and technology ===
- Group (stratigraphy), in geology, consisting of formations or rock strata
- Cultivar group, in biology, a classification category in the International Code of Nomenclature for Cultivated Plants
- Galaxy groups and clusters, in cosmology
- Group (firearms), the grouping of shots from a firearm
- Language group, a unit of classification within a Language family

== Other uses ==
- Group (film), a 2002 comedy drama film by Marilyn Freeman and Anne de Marcken
- Breed Groups (dog), the group or category to which breeds of dogs are assigned by kennel clubs
- Group (auto racing), a category of car allowed to compete in auto racing
- Army group
- Militia groups
- Rebel groups
- Terrorist groups
- Group (military unit), an air force formation
- Corporate group, a group of affiliated companies
- Group psychotherapy, sometimes colloquially known as "group"
- Musical ensemble

== See also ==
- Affiliation (disambiguation)
- Association (disambiguation)
- Class (disambiguation)
- Grouping (disambiguation)
- Grup (disambiguation)
- Grupp, a surname
- List of animal names, including collective nouns for groups of animals
- Set (disambiguation)
- Syndicate
- The Group (disambiguation)
- Union (disambiguation)
