= List of theorems called fundamental =

In mathematics, a fundamental theorem is a theorem which is considered to be central and conceptually important for some topic. For example, the fundamental theorem of calculus gives the relationship between differential calculus and integral calculus. The names are mostly traditional, so that for example the fundamental theorem of arithmetic is basic to what would now be called number theory. Some of these are classification theorems of objects which are mainly dealt with in the field. For instance, the fundamental theorem of curves describes classification of regular curves in space up to translation and rotation.

Likewise, the mathematical literature sometimes refers to the fundamental lemma of a field. The term lemma is conventionally used to denote a proven proposition which is used as a stepping stone to a larger result, rather than as a useful statement in-and-of itself.

== Fundamental theorems of mathematical topics ==
- Fundamental theorem of algebra
- Fundamental theorem of algebraic K-theory
- Fundamental theorem of arithmetic
- Fundamental theorem of Boolean algebra
- Fundamental theorem of calculus
- Fundamental theorem of calculus for line integrals
- Fundamental theorem of curves
- Fundamental theorem of cyclic groups
- Fundamental theorem of dynamical systems
- Fundamental theorem of equivalence relations
- Fundamental theorem of exterior calculus
- Fundamental theorem of finitely generated abelian groups
- Fundamental theorem of finitely generated modules over a principal ideal domain
- Fundamental theorem of finite distributive lattices
- Fundamental theorem of Galois theory
- Fundamental theorem of geometric calculus
- Fundamental theorem on homomorphisms
- Fundamental theorem of ideal theory in number fields
- Fundamental theorem of Lebesgue integral calculus
- Fundamental theorem of linear algebra
- Fundamental theorem of linear programming
- Fundamental theorem of noncommutative algebra
- Fundamental theorem of projective geometry
- Fundamental theorem of random fields
- Fundamental theorem of Riemannian geometry
- Fundamental theorem of tessarine algebra
- Fundamental theorem of symmetric polynomials
- Fundamental theorem of topos theory
- Fundamental theorem of ultraproducts
- Fundamental theorem of vector analysis

Carl Friedrich Gauss referred to the law of quadratic reciprocity as the "fundamental theorem" of quadratic residues.

== Applied or informally stated "fundamental theorems" ==
There are also a number of "fundamental theorems" that are not directly related to mathematics:

- Fundamental theorem of arbitrage-free pricing
- Fisher's fundamental theorem of natural selection
- Fundamental theorems of welfare economics
- Fundamental equations of thermodynamics
- Fundamental theorem of poker
- Holland's schema theorem, or the "fundamental theorem of genetic algorithms"
- Glivenko–Cantelli theorem, or the "fundamental theorem of statistics"
- Fundamental theorem of software engineering

== Fundamental lemmata ==
- Fundamental lemma of the calculus of variations
- Fundamental lemma of Langlands and Shelstad
- Fundamental lemma of sieve theory

== See also ==
- Main theorem of elimination theory
- List of theorems
- Toy theorem
