= Associated =

Associated may refer to:

- Associated, former name of Avon, Contra Costa County, California
- Associated Hebrew Schools of Toronto, a school in Canada
- Associated Newspapers, former name of DMG Media, a British publishing company

== See also ==
- Association (disambiguation)
- Associate (disambiguation)
