= Assoc. =

Assoc. may be an abbreviation for:

- Association
- Associate
