= Mathematical notation =

System of symbolic representation

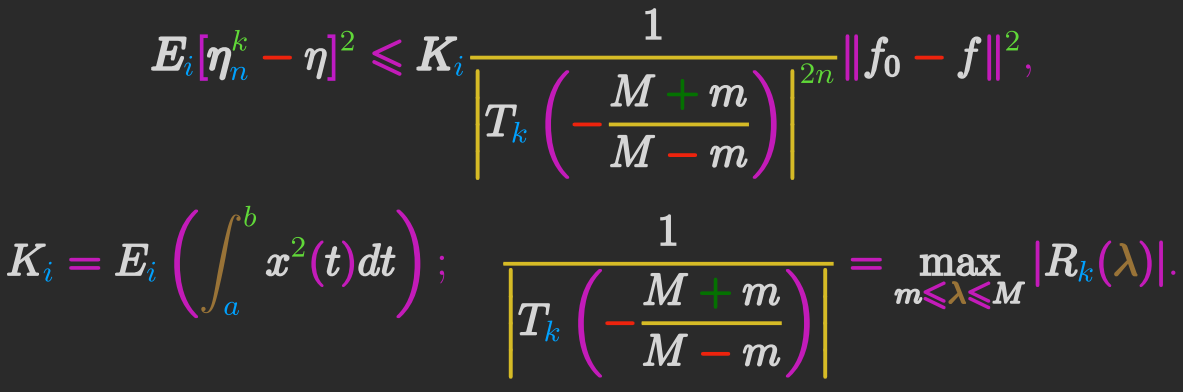
Highlighted LaTeX mathematical notation

Mathematical notation consists of using symbols for representing operations, unspecified numbers, relations, and any other mathematical objects and assembling them into expressions and formulas. Mathematical notation is widely used in mathematics, science, and engineering for representing complex concepts and properties in a concise, unambiguous, and accurate way.

For example, the physicist Albert Einstein's formula $E=mc^2$ is the quantitative representation in mathematical notation of mass–energy equivalence.

Mathematical notation was first introduced by François Viète at the end of the 16th century and largely expanded during the 17th and 18th centuries by René Descartes, Isaac Newton, Gottfried Wilhelm Leibniz, and overall Leonhard Euler.

== Symbols and typeface ==
The use of many symbols is the basis of mathematical notation. They play a similar role as words in natural languages. They may play different roles in mathematical notation similarly as verbs, adjective and nouns play different roles in a sentence.

=== Letters as symbols ===
Letters are typically used for naming—in mathematical jargon, one says representing—mathematical objects. The Latin and Greek alphabets are used extensively, but a few letters of other alphabets are also used sporadically, such as the Hebrew $\aleph$, Cyrillic Ш, and Hiragana よ. Uppercase and lowercase letters are considered as different symbols. For Latin alphabet, different typefaces also provide different symbols. For example, $r, R, \R, \mathcal R, \mathfrak r,$ and $\mathfrak R$ could theoretically appear in the same mathematical text with six different meanings. Normally, roman upright typeface is not used for symbols, except for symbols representing a standard function, such as the symbol "$\sin$" of the sine function.

In order to have more symbols, and for allowing related mathematical objects to be represented by related symbols, diacritics, subscripts and superscripts are often used. For example, $\hat {f'_1}$ may denote the Fourier transform of the derivative of a function called $f_1.$

=== Other symbols ===
Symbols are not only used for naming mathematical objects. They can be used for operations $(+, -, /, \oplus, \ldots),$ for relations $(=, <, \le, \sim, \equiv, \ldots),$ for logical connectives $(\implies, \land, \lor, \ldots),$ for quantifiers $(\forall, \exists),$ and for other purposes.

Some symbols are similar to Latin or Greek letters, some are obtained by deforming letters, some are traditional typographic symbols, but many have been specially designed for mathematics.

=== International standard mathematical notation ===
The International Organization for Standardization (ISO) is an international standard development organization composed of representatives from the national standards organizations of member countries. The international standard ISO 80000-2 (previously, ISO 31-11) specifies symbols for use in mathematical equations. The standard requires use of italic fonts for variables (e.g., E = mc^{2}) and roman (upright) fonts for mathematical constants (e.g., e or π).

== Expressions and formulas ==
An expression is a written arrangement of symbols following the context-dependent, syntactic conventions of mathematical notation. Symbols can denote numbers, variables, operations, and functions. Other symbols include punctuation marks and brackets, used for grouping where there is not a well-defined order of operations.

Expressions are commonly distinguished from formulas: expressions are a kind of mathematical object, whereas formulas are statements about mathematical objects. This is analogous to natural language, where a noun phrase refers to an object, and a whole sentence refers to a fact. For example, $8x-5$ is an expression, while the inequality $8x-5 \geq 3$ is a formula.

To evaluate an expression means to find a numerical value equivalent to the expression. Expressions can be evaluated or simplified by replacing operations that appear in them with their result. For example, the expression $8\times 2-5$ simplifies to $16-5$, and evaluates to $11.$

== History ==
=== Numbers ===
It is believed that a notation to represent numbers was first developed at least 50,000 years ago. Early mathematical ideas such as finger counting have also been represented by collections of rocks, sticks, bone, clay, stone, wood carvings, and knotted ropes. The tally stick is a way of counting dating back to the Upper Paleolithic. Perhaps the oldest known mathematical texts are those of ancient Sumer. The Census Quipu of the Andes and the Ishango Bone from Africa both used the tally mark method of accounting for numerical concepts.

The concept of zero and the introduction of a notation for it are important developments in early mathematics, which predates for centuries the concept of zero as a number. It was used as a placeholder by the Babylonians and Greek Egyptians, and then as an integer by the Mayans, Indians and Muslims (see the history of zero).

=== Modern notation ===
Until the 16th century, mathematics was essentially rhetorical, in the sense that everything but explicit numbers was expressed in words. However, some authors, such as Diophantus, used some symbols as abbreviations.

Michael Stifel's (1487–1567) most important work, Arithmetica integra (1544), contains important innovations in mathematical notation. It has the first use of multiplication by juxtaposition (with no symbol between the terms) in Europe. He is the first to use the term exponent.

The first systematic use of formulas, and, in particular, the use of symbols (variables) for unspecified numbers, is generally attributed to François Viète (1540–1603). However, he used different symbols than those that are now standard.

Later, René Descartes (1596–1650) introduced the modern notation for variables and equations; in particular, the use of $x,y,z$ for unknown quantities and $a,b,c$ for known ones (constants). He introduced also the notation i and the term imaginary for the imaginary unit.

The 18th and 19th centuries saw the standardization of mathematical notation as used today. Leonhard Euler (1707–1783) was responsible for many of the notations currently in use: the functional notation $f(x),$ e for the base of the natural logarithm, $\sum$ for summation, etc. He also popularized the use of π for the Archimedes constant (proposed by William Jones, based on an earlier notation of William Oughtred).

Since then many new notations have been introduced, often specific to a particular area of mathematics. Some notations are named after their inventors, such as Leibniz's notation, Legendre symbol, the Einstein summation convention, etc.

=== Typesetting ===
General typesetting systems are generally not well suited for mathematical notation. One of the reasons is that, in mathematical notation, the symbols are often arranged in two-dimensional figures, such as in:
$$\sum_{n=0}^\infty \frac {\begin{bmatrix}a&b\\c&d\end{bmatrix}^n}{n!}.$$

TeX (/tɛx/) is a mathematically oriented typesetting system that was created in 1978 by Donald Knuth. It is widely used in mathematics, through its extension called LaTeX (/ˈlɑːtɛx/ or /ˈleɪtɛx/), and is a de facto standard. (The above expression is written in LaTeX.)

More recently, another approach for mathematical typesetting is provided by MathML. However, it is not well supported in web browsers, which are its primary target.

== Non-Latin-based mathematical notation ==
Modern Arabic mathematical notation is based mostly on the Arabic alphabet and is used widely in the Arab world, especially in pre-tertiary education. (Western notation uses Arabic numerals, but the Arabic notation also replaces Latin letters and related symbols with Arabic script.)

In addition to Arabic notation, mathematics also makes use of Greek letters to denote a wide variety of mathematical objects and variables. On some occasions, certain Hebrew letters are also used (such as in the context of infinite cardinals).

Some mathematical notations are mostly diagrammatic, and so are almost entirely script independent. Examples are Penrose graphical notation and Coxeter–Dynkin diagrams.

Braille-based mathematical notations used by blind people include Nemeth Braille and GS8 Braille.

== Meaning and interpretation ==
The syntax of notation defines how symbols can be combined to make well-formed expressions, without any given meaning or interpretation. The semantics of notation interprets what the symbols represent and assigns a meaning to the expressions and formulas. The reverse process of taking a statement and writing it in logical or mathematical notation is called translation.

=== Interpretation ===
Given a formal language, an interpretation assigns a domain of discourse to the language. Specifically, it assigns each of the constant symbols to objects of the domain, function letters to functions within the domain, predicate letters to statements, and vairiables are assumed to range over the domain.

=== Map–territory relation ===
The map–territory relation describes the relationship between an object and the representation of that object, such as the Earth and a map of it. In mathematics, this is how the number 4 relates to its representation "4". The quotation marks are the formally correct usage, distinguishing the number from its name. However, it is fairly common practice in math to commit this fallacy saying "Let x denote...", rather than "Let "x" denote..." which is generally harmless.

== Software for mathematical typesetting ==
- AUCTeX
- Authorea
- Apache OpenOffice Math
- AsciiMath
- Calligra Words - Formula editor
- CoCalc
- GNOME LaTeX
- GNU TeXmacs
- Gummi
- KaTeX
- Kile
- LaTeX
- LibreOffice Math
- LyX
- MacTeX
- MathJax
- MathML

- MathType
- Notepad++
- Overleaf
- Scientific WorkPlace
- TeX
- TeX Live
- Texmaker
- TeXnicCenter
- TeXShop
- TeXstudio
- TeXworks
- Typst
- Verbosus
- Vim
- Visual Studio Code - LaTeX Workshop
- WinEdt
- WinFIG
- WinShell

== See also ==
- Abuse of notation
- Associative property
- Chemistry notation
- Denotation
- Knuth's up-arrow notation
- Language of mathematics
- List of open-source software for mathematics
- Mathematical Alphanumeric Symbols
- Modern Arabic mathematical notation
- Notation in probability and statistics
- Principle of compositionality
- Scientific notation
- Semasiography
- Syntactic sugar
- Vector notation
- List of letters used in mathematics, science, and engineering
