= The Associates =

The Associates may refer to:

- The Associates (band), a Scottish band
- The Associates (American TV series), a 1979–1980 American sitcom television series
- The Associates (Canadian TV series), a 2001–2002 Canadian drama television series

== See also ==
- Associates First Capital Corporation, an American lender acquired by Citigroup in 2000
- Associate (disambiguation)
