= Grouping =

Grouping generally refers to the creation of one or more groups, or to the groups themselves.

More specifically, grouping may refer to:

- Shot grouping in shooting sports and other uses of firearms
- the use of symbols of grouping in mathematics (parentheses, etc.)
- the creation of social groups
- The 1923 amalgamations of British railway companies per the Railways Act 1921

== See also ==
- Categorization
- Classification
- Segregation (disambiguation)
