= Net register tonnage =

Unit of volume for cargo capacity of a ship

Net register tonnage (NRT, nrt, n.r.t.) is a ship's cargo volume capacity expressed in "register tons", one of which equals a volume of 100 cubic feet (2.83 m^{3}). It is calculated by subtracting non-revenue-earning spaces i.e. spaces not available for carrying cargo, for example engine rooms, fuel tanks and crew quarters, from the ship's gross register tonnage. Net tonnage is thus used in situations where a vessel's earning capacity is important, rather than its mere size. Net register tonnage is not a measure of the weight of the ship or its cargo, and should not be confused with terms such as deadweight tonnage or displacement.

Gross and net register tonnages were replaced by gross tonnage and net tonnage, respectively, when the International Maritime Organization (IMO) adopted The International Convention on Tonnage Measurement of Ships on 23 June 1969. The new tonnage regulations entered into force for all new ships on 18 July 1982, but existing vessels were given a migration period of 12 years to ensure that ships were given reasonable economic safeguards since port and other dues are charged according to ship's tonnage. Since 18 July 1994, the gross and the net tonnages, dimensionless indices calculated from the total moulded volume of the ship and its cargo spaces by mathematical formulae, have been the only official measures of the ship's tonnage. However, the gross and the net register tonnages are still widely used in describing older ships.

== See also ==
- Tonnage
- Ton#Units of volume
