= Verein =

Verein is a German word, sometimes translated as union, club or association, and may refer to:

- Eingetragener Verein (e. V.), a registered voluntary association under German law
- Swiss Verein, a voluntary association under Swiss law, not necessarily registered

== See also ==
- Association (disambiguation)
- Voluntary association
