= Number sentence =

Equation using numbers and basic operations

In mathematics education, a number sentence is an equation or inequality expressed using numbers and mathematical symbols. The term is used in primary level mathematics teaching in the US, Canada, UK, Australia, New Zealand and South Africa.

== Usage ==
The term is used as means of asking students to write down equations using simple mathematical symbols (numerals, the four main basic mathematical operators, equality symbol). Sometimes boxes or shapes are used to indicate unknown values. As such, number sentences are used to introduce students to notions of structure and elementary algebra prior to a more formal treatment of these concepts.

A number sentence without unknowns is equivalent to a logical proposition expressed using the notation of arithmetic.

== Examples ==
- A valid number sentence that is true: 83 + 19 = 102.
- A valid number sentence that is false: 1 + 1 = 3.
- A valid number sentence using a 'less than' symbol: 3 + 6 < 10.
- A valid number sentence using a 'more than' symbol: 3 + 9 > 11.
- An example from a lesson plan:

Some students will use a direct computational approach. They will carry out the addition 26 + 39 = 65, put 65 = 26 + $\Box$, and then find that $\Box$ = 39.

== See also ==
- Expression (mathematics)
- Equation
- Inequality (mathematics)
- Open sentence
- Sentence (mathematical logic)
