= The Group =

The Group may refer to:

== Film and television ==
- The Group (Australian TV series), a 1971 situation comedy produced by Cash Harmon Television for ATN7
- The Group (Canadian TV series), a 1968–70 music variety on CBC Television
- The Group (film), a 1966 feature directed by Sidney Lumet, based on the novel
- "The Group" (Curb Your Enthusiasm), a 2000 television episode

== Literature ==
- The Group (literature), a group of British poets of the late 1950s and early 1960s
- The Group (novel), a 1963 book by Mary McCarthy
- The Group, a play by Mercy Otis Warren of 1775

== Other ==
- The Group, a 1978–1981 Finnish prog band led by Pekka Pohjola
- The Group (theater), a theatrical company formed in 1964
- The Group, a collection of non-player characters in The Legend of Zelda: Twilight Princess
- The Group, an intentional community based on G. I. Gurdjieff's Fourth Way
- The Group, a religious sect led by Theodore Rinaldo in Snohomish, Washington, USA
- The Group (New Zealand art), a circle of influential New Zealand artists of the 1920s to 1970s
