= Toy model =

Deliberately simplistic scientific model

In scientific modeling, a toy model is a deliberately simplistic model with many details removed so that it can be used to explain a mechanism concisely. It is also useful in a description of the fuller model.

- In toy mathematical models used in mathematical physics, this is usually done by reducing or extending the number of dimensions or reducing the number of fields/variables or restricting them to a particular symmetric form.
- In toy economic models, some may be only loosely based on theory, others more explicitly so. They allow for a quick first pass at some question, and present the essence of the answer from a more complicated model or from a class of models. For the researcher, they may come before writing a more elaborate model, or after, once the elaborate model has been worked out. Blanchard's list of examples includes the IS–LM model, the Mundell–Fleming model, the RBC model, and the New Keynesian model.

== Examples ==
Examples of toy models in physics include:

- the Ising model as a toy model for ferromagnetism, or lattice models more generally. It is the simplest model that allows for Euclidean quantum field theory in statistical physics.
- Newtonian orbital mechanics as described by assuming that Earth is attached to the Sun by an elastic band;
- the Schwarzschild metric, general relativistic model describing a single symmetrical non-rotating non-charged concentration of mass (such as a perfect spherical mass): a simple relativistic "equivalent" of the classical symmetric Newtonian mass (in fact, the first solution of the Einstein field equations to be developed);
- Hawking radiation around a black hole described as conventional radiation from a fictitious membrane at radius r = 2m (the black hole membrane paradigm);
- frame-dragging around a rotating star considered as the effect of space being a conventional viscous fluid;
- the null dust;
- the Gödel metric in general relativity, which allows closed timelike curves;
- the Lambda-CDM model of cosmology, in which general relativistic effects of structure formation are not taken into account.
- the empty universe, a simple expanding universe model;
- the Bohr model of the atom, a "semi-classical" quantum mechanical model of the atom, which can be solved exactly for the hydrogen atom;
- the particle in a box in quantum mechanics;
- the Spekkens model, a hidden-variable theory;
- the primon gas, which illustrates some connections between number theory and physics.

== See also ==
- Physical model – Informative representation of an entity
- Spherical cow – Humorous concept in scientific models
- Toy problem – Simplified example problem used for research or exposition
- Toy theorem – Simplified instance of a general theorem
