= Arabic Mathematical Alphabetic Symbols =

- Range: U+1EE00..U+1EEFF (256 code points)
- Plane: SMP
- Scripts: Arabic
- Symbol sets: Mathematical notation
- Assigned: 143 code points
- Unused: 113 reserved code points

Unicode version history
- 6.1 (2012): 143 (+143)

Unicode documentation
- Code chart ∣ Web page

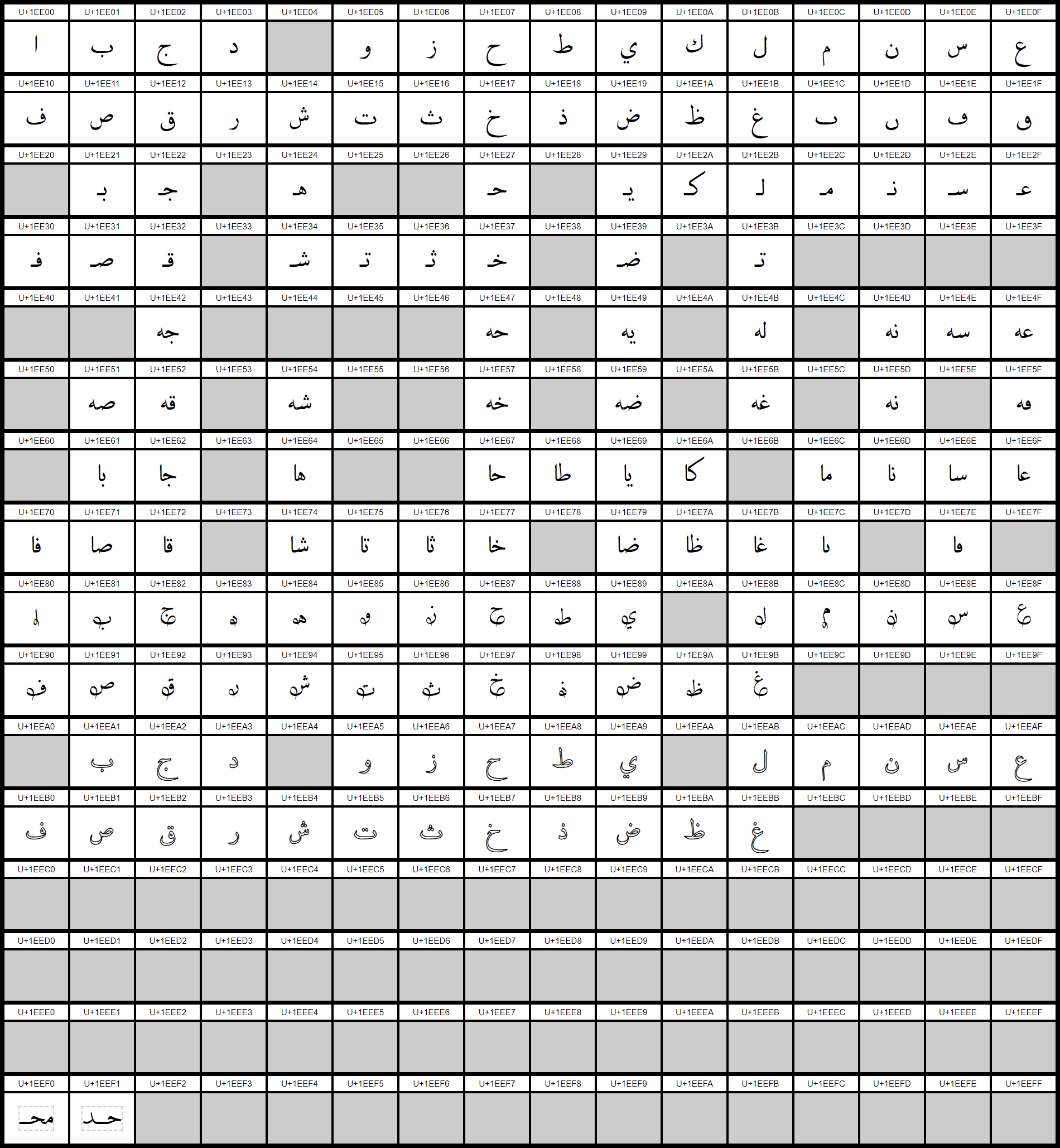
Graphical representation of the Arabic Mathematical Alphabetic Symbols Unicode block

Arabic Mathematical Alphabetic Symbols is a Unicode block encoding characters used in Arabic mathematical expressions.

== Block ==
Arabic Mathematical Alphabetic Symbols^{[1]}^{[2]} Official Unicode Consortium code chart (PDF)
	0	1	2	3	4	5	6	7	8	9	A	B	C	D	E	F
U+1EE0x	𞸀	𞸁	𞸂	𞸃		𞸅	𞸆	𞸇	𞸈	𞸉	𞸊	𞸋	𞸌	𞸍	𞸎	𞸏
U+1EE1x	𞸐	𞸑	𞸒	𞸓	𞸔	𞸕	𞸖	𞸗	𞸘	𞸙	𞸚	𞸛	𞸜	𞸝	𞸞	𞸟
U+1EE2x		𞸡	𞸢		𞸤			𞸧		𞸩	𞸪	𞸫	𞸬	𞸭	𞸮	𞸯
U+1EE3x	𞸰	𞸱	𞸲		𞸴	𞸵	𞸶	𞸷		𞸹		𞸻				
U+1EE4x			𞹂					𞹇		𞹉		𞹋		𞹍	𞹎	𞹏
U+1EE5x		𞹑	𞹒		𞹔			𞹗		𞹙		𞹛		𞹝		𞹟
U+1EE6x		𞹡	𞹢		𞹤			𞹧	𞹨	𞹩	𞹪		𞹬	𞹭	𞹮	𞹯
U+1EE7x	𞹰	𞹱	𞹲		𞹴	𞹵	𞹶	𞹷		𞹹	𞹺	𞹻	𞹼		𞹾	
U+1EE8x	𞺀	𞺁	𞺂	𞺃	𞺄	𞺅	𞺆	𞺇	𞺈	𞺉		𞺋	𞺌	𞺍	𞺎	𞺏
U+1EE9x	𞺐	𞺑	𞺒	𞺓	𞺔	𞺕	𞺖	𞺗	𞺘	𞺙	𞺚	𞺛				
U+1EEAx		𞺡	𞺢	𞺣		𞺥	𞺦	𞺧	𞺨	𞺩		𞺫	𞺬	𞺭	𞺮	𞺯
U+1EEBx	𞺰	𞺱	𞺲	𞺳	𞺴	𞺵	𞺶	𞺷	𞺸	𞺹	𞺺	𞺻				
U+1EECx																
U+1EEDx																
U+1EEEx																
U+1EEFx	𞻰	𞻱														
Notes: 1. As of Unicode version 16.0; 2. Grey areas indicate non-assigned code points

== History ==
The following Unicode-related documents record the purpose and process of defining specific characters in the Arabic Mathematical Alphabetic Symbols block:

Version	Final code points (Note: Proposed code points and characters names may differ from final code points and names)	Count	L2 ID	WG2 ID	Document
6.1	U+1EE00..1EE03, 1EE05..1EE1F, 1EE21..1EE22, 1EE24, 1EE27, 1EE29..1EE32, 1EE34..1EE37, 1EE39, 1EE3B, 1EE42, 1EE47, 1EE49, 1EE4B, 1EE4D..1EE4F, 1EE51..1EE52, 1EE54, 1EE57, 1EE59, 1EE5B, 1EE5D, 1EE5F, 1EE61..1EE62, 1EE64, 1EE67..1EE6A, 1EE6C..1EE72, 1EE74..1EE77, 1EE79..1EE7C, 1EE7E, 1EE80..1EE89, 1EE8B..1EE9B, 1EEA1..1EEA3, 1EEA5..1EEA9, 1EEAB..1EEBB, 1EEF0..1EEF1	143	L2/05-318		Lazrek, Azzeddine (2005-10-24), Proposals for Unicode Consortium [Arabic mathematical symbols]
6.1	U+1EE00..1EE03, 1EE05..1EE1F, 1EE21..1EE22, 1EE24, 1EE27, 1EE29..1EE32, 1EE34..1EE37, 1EE39, 1EE3B, 1EE42, 1EE47, 1EE49, 1EE4B, 1EE4D..1EE4F, 1EE51..1EE52, 1EE54, 1EE57, 1EE59, 1EE5B, 1EE5D, 1EE5F, 1EE61..1EE62, 1EE64, 1EE67..1EE6A, 1EE6C..1EE72, 1EE74..1EE77, 1EE79..1EE7C, 1EE7E, 1EE80..1EE89, 1EE8B..1EE9B, 1EEA1..1EEA3, 1EEA5..1EEA9, 1EEAB..1EEBB, 1EEF0..1EEF1	143	L2/05-319		Lazrek, Azzeddine (2005-07-10), Arabic Mathematical Alphabetic Symbols, Additional characters proposed to Unicode
6.1	U+1EE00..1EE03, 1EE05..1EE1F, 1EE21..1EE22, 1EE24, 1EE27, 1EE29..1EE32, 1EE34..1EE37, 1EE39, 1EE3B, 1EE42, 1EE47, 1EE49, 1EE4B, 1EE4D..1EE4F, 1EE51..1EE52, 1EE54, 1EE57, 1EE59, 1EE5B, 1EE5D, 1EE5F, 1EE61..1EE62, 1EE64, 1EE67..1EE6A, 1EE6C..1EE72, 1EE74..1EE77, 1EE79..1EE7C, 1EE7E, 1EE80..1EE89, 1EE8B..1EE9B, 1EEA1..1EEA3, 1EEA5..1EEA9, 1EEAB..1EEBB, 1EEF0..1EEF1	143	L2/06-124	N3085-1, N3085	Lazrek, Azzeddine (2006-03-30), Arabic Mathematical Alphabetic Symbols
6.1	U+1EE00..1EE03, 1EE05..1EE1F, 1EE21..1EE22, 1EE24, 1EE27, 1EE29..1EE32, 1EE34..1EE37, 1EE39, 1EE3B, 1EE42, 1EE47, 1EE49, 1EE4B, 1EE4D..1EE4F, 1EE51..1EE52, 1EE54, 1EE57, 1EE59, 1EE5B, 1EE5D, 1EE5F, 1EE61..1EE62, 1EE64, 1EE67..1EE6A, 1EE6C..1EE72, 1EE74..1EE77, 1EE79..1EE7C, 1EE7E, 1EE80..1EE89, 1EE8B..1EE9B, 1EEA1..1EEA3, 1EEA5..1EEA9, 1EEAB..1EEBB, 1EEF0..1EEF1	143		N3103 (pdf, doc)	Umamaheswaran, V. S. (2006-08-25), "8.14", Unconfirmed minutes of WG 2 meeting 48, Mountain View, CA, USA; 2006-04-24/27
6.1	U+1EE00..1EE03, 1EE05..1EE1F, 1EE21..1EE22, 1EE24, 1EE27, 1EE29..1EE32, 1EE34..1EE37, 1EE39, 1EE3B, 1EE42, 1EE47, 1EE49, 1EE4B, 1EE4D..1EE4F, 1EE51..1EE52, 1EE54, 1EE57, 1EE59, 1EE5B, 1EE5D, 1EE5F, 1EE61..1EE62, 1EE64, 1EE67..1EE6A, 1EE6C..1EE72, 1EE74..1EE77, 1EE79..1EE7C, 1EE7E, 1EE80..1EE89, 1EE8B..1EE9B, 1EEA1..1EEA3, 1EEA5..1EEA9, 1EEAB..1EEBB, 1EEF0..1EEF1	143	L2/10-055		Lazrek, Azzeddine; et al. (2010-01-31), Arabic Math Alphabetic Symbols
6.1	U+1EE00..1EE03, 1EE05..1EE1F, 1EE21..1EE22, 1EE24, 1EE27, 1EE29..1EE32, 1EE34..1EE37, 1EE39, 1EE3B, 1EE42, 1EE47, 1EE49, 1EE4B, 1EE4D..1EE4F, 1EE51..1EE52, 1EE54, 1EE57, 1EE59, 1EE5B, 1EE5D, 1EE5F, 1EE61..1EE62, 1EE64, 1EE67..1EE6A, 1EE6C..1EE72, 1EE74..1EE77, 1EE79..1EE7C, 1EE7E, 1EE80..1EE89, 1EE8B..1EE9B, 1EEA1..1EEA3, 1EEA5..1EEA9, 1EEAB..1EEBB, 1EEF0..1EEF1	143	L2/10-108		Moore, Lisa (2010-05-19), "Consensus 123-C11, 123-C27", UTC #123 / L2 #220 Minutes, "Change the general category of the Arabic math alphabetics to "Lo" U+1EE00 through U+1EEBB and give them a font decomposition, and also assign them the "other math" property."
6.1	U+1EE00..1EE03, 1EE05..1EE1F, 1EE21..1EE22, 1EE24, 1EE27, 1EE29..1EE32, 1EE34..1EE37, 1EE39, 1EE3B, 1EE42, 1EE47, 1EE49, 1EE4B, 1EE4D..1EE4F, 1EE51..1EE52, 1EE54, 1EE57, 1EE59, 1EE5B, 1EE5D, 1EE5F, 1EE61..1EE62, 1EE64, 1EE67..1EE6A, 1EE6C..1EE72, 1EE74..1EE77, 1EE79..1EE7C, 1EE7E, 1EE80..1EE89, 1EE8B..1EE9B, 1EEA1..1EEA3, 1EEA5..1EEA9, 1EEAB..1EEBB, 1EEF0..1EEF1	143	L2/10-105R	N3799R	Lazrek, Azzeddine; Sargent, Murray; Pournader, Roozbeh; Allawi, Adil; Anderson, Deborah (2010-08-01), Proposal for Arabic Mathematical Alphabetic Symbols
6.1	U+1EE00..1EE03, 1EE05..1EE1F, 1EE21..1EE22, 1EE24, 1EE27, 1EE29..1EE32, 1EE34..1EE37, 1EE39, 1EE3B, 1EE42, 1EE47, 1EE49, 1EE4B, 1EE4D..1EE4F, 1EE51..1EE52, 1EE54, 1EE57, 1EE59, 1EE5B, 1EE5D, 1EE5F, 1EE61..1EE62, 1EE64, 1EE67..1EE6A, 1EE6C..1EE72, 1EE74..1EE77, 1EE79..1EE7C, 1EE7E, 1EE80..1EE89, 1EE8B..1EE9B, 1EEA1..1EEA3, 1EEA5..1EEA9, 1EEAB..1EEBB, 1EEF0..1EEF1	143		N3803 (pdf, doc)	"M56.11", Unconfirmed minutes of WG 2 meeting no. 56, 2010-09-24
6.1	U+1EE00..1EE03, 1EE05..1EE1F, 1EE21..1EE22, 1EE24, 1EE27, 1EE29..1EE32, 1EE34..1EE37, 1EE39, 1EE3B, 1EE42, 1EE47, 1EE49, 1EE4B, 1EE4D..1EE4F, 1EE51..1EE52, 1EE54, 1EE57, 1EE59, 1EE5B, 1EE5D, 1EE5F, 1EE61..1EE62, 1EE64, 1EE67..1EE6A, 1EE6C..1EE72, 1EE74..1EE77, 1EE79..1EE7C, 1EE7E, 1EE80..1EE89, 1EE8B..1EE9B, 1EEA1..1EEA3, 1EEA5..1EEA9, 1EEAB..1EEBB, 1EEF0..1EEF1	143	L2/14-052		Iancu, Laurențiu; Sargent, Murray (2014-01-31), Proposal to assign math-class property values to the Arabic mathematical alphabetic symbols
6.1	U+1EE00..1EE03, 1EE05..1EE1F, 1EE21..1EE22, 1EE24, 1EE27, 1EE29..1EE32, 1EE34..1EE37, 1EE39, 1EE3B, 1EE42, 1EE47, 1EE49, 1EE4B, 1EE4D..1EE4F, 1EE51..1EE52, 1EE54, 1EE57, 1EE59, 1EE5B, 1EE5D, 1EE5F, 1EE61..1EE62, 1EE64, 1EE67..1EE6A, 1EE6C..1EE72, 1EE74..1EE77, 1EE79..1EE7C, 1EE7E, 1EE80..1EE89, 1EE8B..1EE9B, 1EEA1..1EEA3, 1EEA5..1EEA9, 1EEAB..1EEBB, 1EEF0..1EEF1	143	L2/14-026		Moore, Lisa (2014-02-17), "B.14.7", UTC #138 Minutes
