= Modern Arabic mathematical notation =

Mathematical notation based on the Arabic script

Modern Arabic mathematical notation is a mathematical notation based on the Arabic script, used especially at pre-university levels of education. Its form is mostly derived from Western notation, but has some notable features that set it apart from its Western counterpart. The most remarkable of those features is the fact that it is written from right to left following the normal direction of the Arabic script. Other differences include the replacement of the Greek and Latin alphabet letters for symbols with Arabic letters and the use of Arabic names for functions and relations.

== Features ==
- It is written from right to left following the normal direction of the Arabic script. Other differences include the replacement of the Latin alphabet letters for symbols with Arabic letters and the use of Arabic names for functions and relations.
- The notation exhibits one of the very few remaining vestiges of non-dotted Arabic scripts, as dots over and under letters (i'jam) are usually omitted.
- Letter cursivity (connectedness) of Arabic is also taken advantage of, in a few cases, to define variables using more than one letter. The most widespread example of this kind of usage is the canonical symbol for the radius of a circle ؈ (Arabic pronunciation: [nɑq]), which is written using the two letters nūn and qāf. When variable names are juxtaposed (as when expressing multiplication) they are written non-cursively.

== Variations ==
Notation differs slightly from one region to another. In tertiary education, most regions use the Western notation. The notation mainly differs in numeral system used, and in mathematical symbols used.

=== Numeral systems ===
There are three numeral systems used in right to left mathematical notation.

- "Western Arabic numerals" (sometimes called European) are used in western Arabic regions (e.g. Morocco)
- "Eastern Arabic numerals" are used in middle and eastern Arabic regions (e.g. Egypt and Syria)
- "Eastern Arabic-Indic numerals" are used in Persian and Urdu speaking regions (e.g. Iran, Pakistan, India)

| European (descended from Western Arabic) | 0 | 1 | 2 | 3 | 4 | 5 | 6 | 7 | 8 | 9 |
| Arabic-Indic (Eastern Arabic) | ٠ | ١ | ٢ | ٣ | ٤ | ٥ | ٦ | ٧ | ٨ | ٩ |
| Perso-Arabic variant | ۰ | ۱ | ۲ | ۳ | ۴ | ۵ | ۶ | ۷ | ۸ | ۹ |
| Urdu variant | ۰ | ۱ | ۲ | ۳ | ۴ | ۵ | ۶ | ۷ | ۸ | ۹ |

Written numerals are arranged with their lowest-value digit to the right, with higher value positions added to the left. That is identical to the arrangement used by Western texts using Hindu-Arabic numerals even though Arabic script is read from right to left: Indeed, Western texts are written with the ones digit on the right because when the arithmetical manuals were translated from the Arabic, the numerals were treated as figures (like in a Euclidean diagram), and so were not flipped to match the Left-Right order of Latin text. The symbols "٫" and "٬" may be used as the decimal mark and the thousands separator respectively when writing with Eastern Arabic numerals, e.g. ٣٫١٤١٥٩٢٦٥٣٥٨ 3.14159265358, ١٬٠٠٠٬٠٠٠٬٠٠٠ 1,000,000,000. Negative signs are written to the left of magnitudes, e.g. ٣− −3. In-line fractions are written with the numerator and denominator on the left and right of the fraction slash respectively, e.g. ٢/٧ 2/7.

=== Symbols ===
Sometimes, symbols used in Arabic mathematical notation differ according to the region:

Arabic mathematical limit in different forms
| Latin | Arabic | Persian |
| x^{4} | س^{٤} ^{[a]} | س^{۴} ^{[b]} |

- ^a نهــــا nūn-hāʾ-ʾalif is derived from the first three letters of Arabic نهاية nihāya "limit".
- ^b حد ḥadd is Persian for "limit".

Sometimes, mirrored Latin and Greek symbols are used in Arabic mathematical notation (especially in western Arabic regions):

Arabic mathematical sum in different forms
| Latin | Arabic | Mirrored Latin and Greek |
| ^{3}√x | ^{٣}√س̅ ^{[c]} | √^{3}س̅ |

- ^c مجــــ is derived from Arabic مجموع maǧmūʿ "sum".

However, in Iran, usually Latin and Greek symbols are used.

== Examples ==
=== Mathematical letters ===
| Latin | Arabic | Notes |
|---|---|---|
| $a$ | ا | From the Arabic letter ا ʾalif; a and ا ʾalif are the first letters of the Latin alphabet and the Arabic alphabet's ʾabjadī sequence respectively, and the letters also share a common ancestor and the same sound |
| $b$ | ٮ | A dotless ب bāʾ; b and ب bāʾ are the second letters of the Latin alphabet and the ʾabjadī sequence respectively |
| $c$ | حــــ | From the initial form of ح ḥāʾ, or that of a dotless ج jīm; c and ج jīm are the third letters of the Latin alphabet and the ʾabjadī sequence respectively, and the letters also share a common ancestor and the same sound |
| $d$ | د | From the Arabic letter د dāl; d and د dāl are the fourth letters of the Latin alphabet and the ʾabjadī sequence respectively, and the letters also share a common ancestor and the same sound |
| $x$ | س | From the Arabic letter س sīn. It is contested that the usage of Latin x in maths is derived from the first letter ش šīn (without its dots) of the Arabic word شيء šayʾ(un) [ʃajʔ(un)], meaning thing. (X was used in old Spanish for the sound /ʃ/). However, according to others there is no historical evidence for this. |
| $y$ | ص | From the Arabic letter ص ṣād |
| $z$ | ع | From the Arabic letter ع ʿayn |

=== Mathematical constants and units ===
| Description | Latin | Arabic | Notes |
|---|---|---|---|
| Euler's number | $e$ | ھ | Initial form of the Arabic letter ه hāʾ. Both Latin letter e and Arabic letter ه hāʾ are descendants of Phoenician letter hē. |
| imaginary unit | $i$ | ت | From ت tāʾ, which is in turn derived from the first letter of the second word of وحدة تخيلية waḥdaẗun taḫīliyya "imaginary unit" |
| pi | $\pi$ | ط | From ط ṭāʾ; also $\pi$ in some regions |
| radius | $r$ | ؈ | From ن nūn followed by a dotless ق qāf, which is in turn derived from نصف القطر nuṣfu l-quṭr "radius" |
| kilogram | kg | كجم | From كجم kāf-jīm-mīm. In some regions alternative symbols like (كغ kāf-ġayn) or (كلغ kāf-lām-ġayn) are used. All three abbreviations are derived from كيلوغرام kīlūġrām "kilogram" and its variant spellings. |
| gram | g | جم | From جم jīm-mīm, which is in turn derived from جرام jrām, a variant spelling of غرام ġrām "gram" |
| metre | m | م | From م mīm, which is in turn derived from متر mitr "metre" |
| centimetre | cm | سم | From سم sīn-mīm, which is in turn derived from سنتيمتر "centimetre" |
| millimetre | mm | مم | From مم mīm-mīm, which is in turn derived from مليمتر millīmitr "millimetre" |
| kilometre | km | كم | From كم kāf-mīm; also (كلم kāf-lām-mīm) in some regions; both are derived from كيلومتر kīlūmitr "kilometre". |
| second | s | ث | From ث ṯāʾ, which is in turn derived from ثانية ṯāniya "second" |
| minute | min | د | From د dālʾ, which is in turn derived from دقيقة daqīqa "minute"; also (ٯ, i.e. dotless ق qāf) in some regions |
| hour | h | س | From س sīnʾ, which is in turn derived from ساعة sāʿa "hour" |
| kilometre per hour | km/h | كم/س | From the symbols for kilometre and hour |
| degree Celsius | °C | °س | From س sīn, which is in turn derived from the second word of درجة سيلسيوس darajat sīlsīūs "degree Celsius"; also (°م) from م mīmʾ, which is in turn derived from the first letter of the third word of درجة حرارة مئوية "degree centigrade" |
| degree Fahrenheit | °F | °ف | From ف fāʾ, which is in turn derived from the second word of درجة فهرنهايت darajat fahranhāyt "degree Fahrenheit" |
| millimetres of mercury | mmHg | مم‌ز | From مم‌ز mīm-mīm zayn, which is in turn derived from the initial letters of the words مليمتر زئبق "millimetres of mercury" |
| Ångström | Å | أْ | From أْ ʾalif with hamzah and ring above, which is in turn derived from the first letter of "Ångström", variously spelled أنغستروم or أنجستروم |

=== Sets and number systems ===
| Description | Latin | Arabic | | Notes |
|---|---|---|---|---|
| Natural numbers | $\mathbb{N}$ | | ط | From ط ṭāʾ, which is in turn derived from the first letter of the second word of عدد طبيعيʿadadun ṭabīʿiyyun "natural number" |
| Integers | $\mathbb{Z}$ | | ص | From ص ṣād, which is in turn derived from the first letter of the second word of عدد صحيح ʿadadun ṣaḥīḥun "integer" |
| Rational numbers | $\mathbb{Q}$ | | ن | From ن nūn, which is in turn derived from the first letter of نسبة nisba "ratio" |
| Real numbers | $\mathbb{R}$ | | ح | From ح ḥāʾ, which is in turn derived from the first letter of the second word of عدد حقيقي ʿadadun ḥaqīqiyyun "real number" |
| Imaginary numbers | $\mathbb{I}$ | | ت | From ت tāʾ, which is in turn derived from the first letter of the second word of عدد تخيلي ʿadadun taḫīliyyun "imaginary number" |
| Complex numbers | $\mathbb{C}$ | | م | From م mīm, which is in turn derived from the first letter of the second word of عدد مركب ʿadadun murakkabun "complex number" |
| Empty set | $\varnothing$ | $\varnothing$ | ∅ | |
| Is an element of | $\in$ | $\ni$ | ∈ | A mirrored ∈ |
| Subset | $\subset$ | $\supset$ | ⊂ | A mirrored ⊂ |
| Superset | $\supset$ | $\subset$ | ⊃ | A mirrored ⊃ |
| Universal set | $\mathbf{S}$ | | ش | From ش šīn, which is in turn derived from the first letter of the second word of مجموعة شاملة majmūʿatun šāmila "universal set" |

=== Arithmetic and algebra ===
| Description | Latin/Greek | Arabic | Notes |
|---|---|---|---|
| Percent | % | ٪ | e.g. 100% "٪١٠٠" |
| Permille | ‰ | ؉ | ؊ is an Arabic equivalent of the per ten thousand sign ‱. |
| Is proportional to | $\propto$ | ∝ | A mirrored ∝ |
| n ^{th} root | $\sqrt[n]{\,\,\,}$ | ^{ں}√ | ں is a dotless ن nūn while √ is a mirrored radical sign √ |
| Logarithm | $\log$ | لو | From لو lām-wāw, which is in turn derived from لوغاريتم lūġārītm "logarithm" |
| Logarithm to base b | $\log_b$ | لو_{ٮ} | |
| Natural logarithm | $\ln$ | لو_{ھ} لط | From the symbols of logarithm and Euler's number |
| Summation | $\sum$ | مجــــ | مجـــ mīm-medial form of jīm is derived from the first two letters of مجموع majmūʿ "sum"; also (∑, a mirrored summation sign ∑) in some regions |
| Product | $\prod$ | جــــذ | From جذ jīm-ḏāl. The Arabic word for "product" is جداء jadāʾun. Also $\prod$ in some regions. |
| Factorial | $n!$ | ں | Also ( ں! ) in some regions |
| Permutations | $^n\mathbf{P}_r$ | ^{ں}ل_{ر} | Also ( ل(ں، ر) ) is used in some regions as $\mathbf{P}(n,r)$ |
| Combinations | $^n\mathbf{C}_k$ | ^{ں}ٯ_{ك} | Also ( ٯ(ں، ك) ) is used in some regions as $\mathbf{C}(n,k)$ and (^{ں}_{ك} ) as the binomial coefficient $n \choose k$ |

=== Trigonometric and hyperbolic functions ===
==== Trigonometric functions ====
| Description | Latin | Arabic | Notes |
|---|---|---|---|
| Sine | $\sin$ | حا | from حاء ḥāʾ (i.e. dotless ج jīm)-ʾalif; also (جب jīm-bāʾ) is used in some regions (e.g. Syria); Arabic for "sine" is جيب jayb |
| Cosine | $\cos$ | حتا | from حتا ḥāʾ (i.e. dotless ج jīm)-tāʾ-ʾalif; also (تجب tāʾ-jīm-bāʾ) is used in some regions (e.g. Syria); Arabic for "cosine" is جيب تمام |
| Tangent | $\tan$ | طا | from طا ṭāʾ (i.e. dotless ظ ẓāʾ)-ʾalif; also (ظل ẓāʾ-lām) is used in some regions (e.g. Syria); Arabic for "tangent" is ظل ẓill |
| Cotangent | $\cot$ | طتا | from طتا ṭāʾ (i.e. dotless ظ ẓāʾ)-tāʾ-ʾalif; also (تظل tāʾ-ẓāʾ-lām) is used in some regions (e.g. Syria); Arabic for "cotangent" is ظل تمام |
| Secant | $\sec$ | ٯا | from ٯا dotless ق qāf-ʾalif; Arabic for "secant" is قاطع |
| Cosecant | $\csc$ | ٯتا | from ٯتا dotless ق qāf-tāʾ-ʾalif; Arabic for "cosecant" is قاطع تمام |

==== Hyperbolic functions ====
The letter (ز zayn, from the first letter of the second word of دالة زائدية "hyperbolic function") is added to the end of trigonometric functions to express hyperbolic functions. This is similar to the way $\operatorname{h}$ is added to the end of trigonometric functions in Latin-based notation.

Arabic hyperbolic functions
| Description | Hyperbolic sine | Hyperbolic cosine | Hyperbolic tangent | Hyperbolic cotangent | Hyperbolic secant | Hyperbolic cosecant |
| Latin | $\sinh$ | $\cosh$ | $\tanh$ | $\coth$ | $\operatorname{sech}$ | $\operatorname{csch}$ |
| Arabic | حاز | حتاز | طاز | طتاز | ٯاز | ٯتاز |

==== Inverse trigonometric functions ====
For inverse trigonometric functions, the superscript −١ in Arabic notation is similar in usage to the superscript $-1$ in Latin-based notation.

Arabic inverse trigonometric functions
| Description | Inverse sine | Inverse cosine | Inverse tangent | Inverse cotangent | Inverse secant | Inverse cosecant |
| Latin | $\sin^{-1}$ | $\cos^{-1}$ | $\tan^{-1}$ | $\cot^{-1}$ | $\sec^{-1}$ | $\csc^{-1}$ |
| Arabic | حا^{−١} | حتا^{−١} | طا^{−١} | طتا^{−١} | ٯا^{−١} | ٯتا^{−١} |

==== Inverse hyperbolic functions ====
Arabic inverse hyperbolic functions
| Description | Inverse hyperbolic sine | Inverse hyperbolic cosine | Inverse hyperbolic tangent | Inverse hyperbolic cotangent | Inverse hyperbolic secant | Inverse hyperbolic cosecant |
| Latin | $\sinh^{-1}$ | $\cosh^{-1}$ | $\tanh^{-1}$ | $\coth^{-1}$ | $\operatorname{sech}^{-1}$ | $\operatorname{csch}^{-1}$ |
| Arabic | حاز^{−١} | حتاز^{−١} | طاز^{−١} | طتاز^{−١} | ٯاز^{−١} | ٯتاز^{−١} |

=== Calculus ===
| Description | Latin | Arabic | Notes |
|---|---|---|---|
| Limit | $\lim$ | نهــــا | نهــــا nūn-hāʾ-ʾalif is derived from the first three letters of Arabic نهاية nihāya "limit" |
| Function | $\mathbf{f}(x)$ | د(س) | د dāl is derived from the first letter of دالة "function". Also called تابع, تا for short, in some regions. |
| Derivatives | $\mathbf{f'}(x), \dfrac{dy}{dx} , \dfrac{d^2y}{dx^2} , \dfrac{\partial {y}}{\partial{x}}$ | ص∂/س∂ ،د^{٢}ص/ د‌س^{٢} ،د‌ص/ د‌س ،(س)‵د | ‵ is a mirrored prime ′ while ، is an Arabic comma. The ∂ signs should be mirrored: ∂. |
| Integrals | $\int{} , \iint{} ,\iiint{}, \oint{}$ | ∮ ،∭ ،∬ ،∫ | Mirrored ∫, ∬, ∭ and ∮ |

=== Complex analysis ===
| Latin/Greek | Arabic |
|---|---|
| $z = x + iy = r(\cos{\varphi}+i \sin{\varphi})= r e^{i\varphi} = r\angle{\varphi}$ | |
| $z = x + iy = r(\cos{\varphi}+i \sin{\varphi})= r e^{i\varphi} = r\angle{\varphi}$ | ع = س + ت ص = ل(حتا ى + ت حا ى) = ل ھ^{ت‌ى} = ل∠o |

== See also ==
- Mathematical notation
- Arabic Mathematical Alphabetic Symbols
