= Toy theorem =

Simplified instance of a general theorem

In mathematics, a toy theorem is a simplified instance (special case) of a more general theorem, which can be useful in providing a handy representation of the general theorem, or a framework for proving the general theorem. One way of obtaining a toy theorem is by introducing some simplifying assumptions in a theorem.

In many cases, a toy theorem is used to illustrate the claim of a theorem, while in other cases, studying the proofs of a toy theorem (derived from a non-trivial theorem) can provide insight that would be hard to obtain otherwise.

Toy theorems can also have educational value as well. For example, after presenting a theorem (with, say, a highly non-trivial proof), one can sometimes give some assurance that the theorem really holds, by proving a toy version of the theorem.

== Examples ==
A toy theorem of the Brouwer fixed-point theorem is obtained by restricting the dimension to one. In this case, the Brouwer fixed-point theorem follows almost immediately from the intermediate value theorem.

Another example of toy theorem is Rolle's theorem, which is obtained from the mean value theorem by equating the function values at the endpoints.

== See also ==
- Corollary
- Fundamental theorem
- Lemma (mathematics)
- Toy model
