= Theorem =

In mathematics, a statement that has been proven

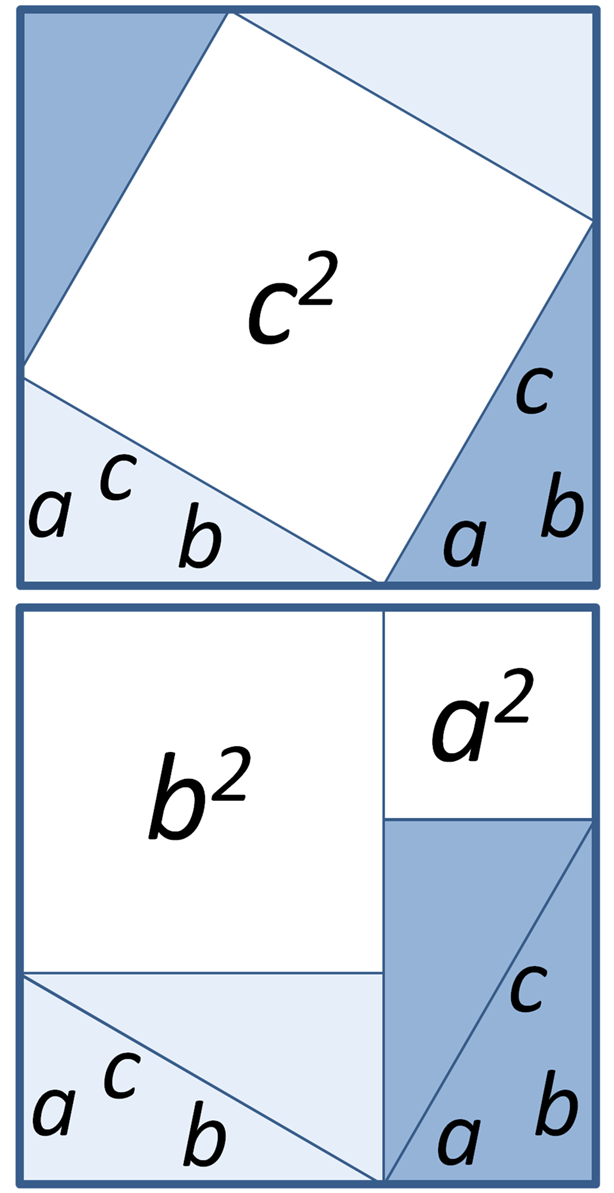
The Pythagorean theorem has at least 370 known proofs.

In mathematics and formal logic, a theorem is a statement that has been proven, or can be proven. (Note: In general, the distinction is weak, as the standard way to prove that a statement is provable consists of proving it. However, in mathematical logic, one considers often the set of all theorems of a theory, although one cannot prove them individually.) The proof of a theorem is a logical argument that uses the inference rules of a deductive system to establish that the theorem is a logical consequence of the axioms and previously proved theorems.

In mainstream mathematics, the axioms and the inference rules are commonly left implicit, and, in this case, they are almost always those of Zermelo–Fraenkel set theory with the axiom of choice (ZFC), or of a less powerful theory, such as Peano arithmetic. (Note: An exception is the original Wiles's proof of Fermat's Last Theorem, which relies implicitly on Grothendieck universes, whose existence requires the addition of a new axiom to set theory. This reliance on a new axiom of set theory has since been removed. Nevertheless, it is rather astonishing that the first proof of a statement expressed in elementary arithmetic involves the existence of very large infinite sets.) Generally, an assertion that is explicitly called a theorem is a proved result that is not an immediate consequence of other known theorems. Moreover, many authors qualify as theorems only the most important results, and use the terms lemma, proposition and corollary for less important theorems.

In mathematical logic, the concepts of theorems and proofs have been formalized in order to allow mathematical reasoning about them. In this context, statements become well-formed formulas of some formal language. A theory consists of some basis statements called axioms, and some deducing rules (sometimes included in the axioms). The theorems of the theory are the statements that can be derived from the axioms by using the deducing rules. (Note: A theory is often identified with the set of its theorems. This is avoided here for clarity, and also for not depending on set theory.) This formalization led to proof theory, which allows proving general theorems about theorems and proofs. In particular, Gödel's incompleteness theorems show that every consistent theory containing the natural numbers has true statements on natural numbers that are not theorems of the theory (that is they cannot be proved inside the theory).

As the axioms are often abstractions of properties of the physical world, theorems may be considered as expressing some truth, but in contrast to the notion of a scientific law, which is experimental, the justification of the truth of a theorem is purely deductive. (Note: However, both theorems and scientific law are the result of investigations. See Heath 1897, p. clxxxii, Introduction, The terminology of Archimedes: "theorem (θεὼρνμα) from θεωρεἳν to investigate") A conjecture is a tentative proposition that may evolve to become a theorem if proven true.

== Theoremhood and truth ==
Until the late 19th century and the foundational crisis of mathematics, all mathematical theorems were built from a few basic properties that were considered self-evident, such as the fact that every natural number has a successor or that there is exactly one line that passes through two given distinct points, or the logical inference rules used to combine these facts in the proof of a theorem. These basic properties that were considered as absolutely evident were called postulates or axioms, for example Euclid's postulates. All theorems were proved by using these basic properties implicitly or explicitly. And because these basic properties were considered self-evident, a proved theorem was considered as a definitive truth, unless there was an error in the proof. For example, Euclid proved from a few axioms and postulates that the sum of the interior angles of a triangle equals 180°, and this was considered an unquestionable fact.

One aspect of the foundational crisis of mathematics was the discovery of non-Euclidean geometries created by changing Euclid's fifth postulate. These geometries do not lead to any internal contradictions, although, in such geometries, the sum of the angles of a triangle is different from 180°. In other words, the property "the sum of the angles of a triangle equals 180°" can be either true or false, depending on whether Euclid's fifth postulate is assumed or denied. Similarly, in the 19th century, the use of some "evident" basic properties of sets led to the contradiction of Russell's paradox. This has been resolved by modifying the axioms that are allowed for manipulating sets.

In general, the crisis of the 19th century was resolved by revisiting the foundations of mathematics to make them more rigorous. In these new foundations, a theorem is a well-formed formula of a mathematical theory that can be proved from the axioms and inference rules of the theory. So, the above theorem on the sum of the angles of a triangle becomes: Under the axioms and inference rules of Euclidean geometry, the sum of the interior angles of a triangle equals 180°. Similarly, Russell's paradox disappears because, in modern axiomatized set theory, the set of all sets cannot be expressed with a well-formed formula. More precisely, if the set of all sets could be expressed with a well-formed formula, this would imply that the theory is inconsistent, and every well-formed assertion, as well as its negation, would be a theorem.

In this context, the validity of a theorem depends only on the correctness of its proof. It is independent from the truth, or even the meaning of the axioms in the "real world." This does not mean that the meaning of the axioms is uninteresting, but only that the validity of a theorem is independent from the meaning of the axioms. This independence may be useful by allowing the use of results of some area of mathematics in apparently unrelated areas.

An important consequence of this way of thinking about mathematics is that it allows defining mathematical theories and theorems as mathematical objects, and to prove theorems about them. In particular, there are well-formed assertions that can be proved to not be a theorem of the ambient theory, although they can be proved in a wider theory. An example is Goodstein's theorem, which can be stated in Peano arithmetic, but is proved to be not provable in Peano arithmetic. However, it is provable in some more general theories, such as Zermelo–Fraenkel set theory.

== Epistemological considerations ==
Many mathematical theorems are conditional statements, whose proofs deduce conclusions from conditions known as hypotheses or premises. In light of the interpretation of proof as justification of truth, the conclusion is often viewed as a necessary consequence of the hypotheses. Namely, that the conclusion is true in case the hypotheses are true—without any further assumptions. However, the conditional could also be interpreted differently in certain deductive systems, depending on the meanings assigned to the derivation rules and the conditional symbol (e.g., non-classical logic).

Although theorems can be written in a completely symbolic form (e.g., as propositions in propositional calculus), they are often expressed informally in a natural language such as English for better readability. The same is true of proofs, which are often expressed as logically organized and clearly worded informal arguments, intended to convince readers of the truth of the statement of the theorem beyond any doubt, and from which a formal symbolic proof can in principle be constructed.

In addition to the better readability, informal arguments are typically easier to check than purely symbolic ones—indeed, many mathematicians would express a preference for a proof that not only demonstrates the validity of a theorem, but also explains in some way why it is obviously true. In some cases, one might even be able to substantiate a theorem by using a picture as its proof.

Because theorems lie at the core of mathematics, they are also central to its aesthetics. Theorems are often described as being "trivial", or "difficult", or "deep", or even "beautiful". These subjective judgments vary not only from person to person, but also with time and culture: for example, as a proof is obtained, simplified or better understood, a theorem that was once difficult may become trivial. On the other hand, a deep theorem may be stated simply, but its proof may involve surprising and subtle connections between disparate areas of mathematics. Fermat's Last Theorem is a particularly well-known example of such a theorem.

== Informal account of theorems ==
Logically, many theorems are of the form of an indicative conditional: If A, then B. Such a theorem does not assert B — only that B is a necessary consequence of A. In this case, A is called the hypothesis of the theorem ("hypothesis" here means something very different from a conjecture), and B the conclusion of the theorem. The two together (without the proof) are called the proposition or statement of the theorem (e.g. "If A, then B" is the proposition). Alternatively, A and B can be also termed the antecedent and the consequent, respectively. The theorem "If n is an even natural number, then n/2 is a natural number" is a typical example in which the hypothesis is "n is an even natural number", and the conclusion is "n/2 is also a natural number".

In order for a theorem to be proved, it must be in principle expressible as a precise, formal statement. However, theorems are usually expressed in natural language rather than in a completely symbolic form—with the presumption that a formal statement can be derived from the informal one.

It is common in mathematics to choose a number of hypotheses within a given language and declare that the theory consists of all statements provable from these hypotheses. These hypotheses form the foundational basis of the theory and are called axioms or postulates. The field of mathematics known as proof theory studies formal languages, axioms and the structure of proofs.

A planar map with five colors such that no two regions with the same color meet. It can actually be colored in this way with only four colors. The four color theorem states that such colorings are possible for any planar map, but every known proof involves a computational search that is too long to check by hand.

Some theorems are "trivial", in the sense that they follow from definitions, axioms, and other theorems in obvious ways and do not contain any surprising insights. Some, on the other hand, may be called "deep", because their proofs may be long and difficult, involve areas of mathematics superficially distinct from the statement of the theorem itself, or show surprising connections between disparate areas of mathematics. A theorem might be simple to state and yet be deep. An excellent example is Fermat's Last Theorem, and there are many other examples of simple yet deep theorems in number theory and combinatorics, among other areas.

Other theorems have a known proof that cannot easily be written down. The most prominent examples are the four color theorem and the Kepler conjecture. Both of these theorems are only known to be true by reducing them to a computational search that is then verified by a computer program. Initially, many mathematicians did not accept this form of proof, but it has become more widely accepted. The mathematician Doron Zeilberger has even gone so far as to claim that these are possibly the only nontrivial results that mathematicians have ever proved. Many mathematical theorems can be reduced to more straightforward computation, including polynomial identities, trigonometric identities (Note: Such as the derivation of the formula for $\tan (\alpha + \beta)$ from the addition formulas of sine and cosine.) and hypergeometric identities.

== Relation with scientific theories ==
Theorems in mathematics and theories in science are fundamentally different in their epistemology. A scientific theory cannot be proved; its key attribute is that it is falsifiable, that is, it makes predictions about the natural world that are testable by experiments. Any disagreement between prediction and experiment demonstrates the incorrectness of the scientific theory, or at least limits its accuracy or domain of validity. Mathematical theorems, on the other hand, are purely abstract formal statements: the proof of a theorem cannot involve experiments or other empirical evidence in the same way such evidence is used to support scientific theories.

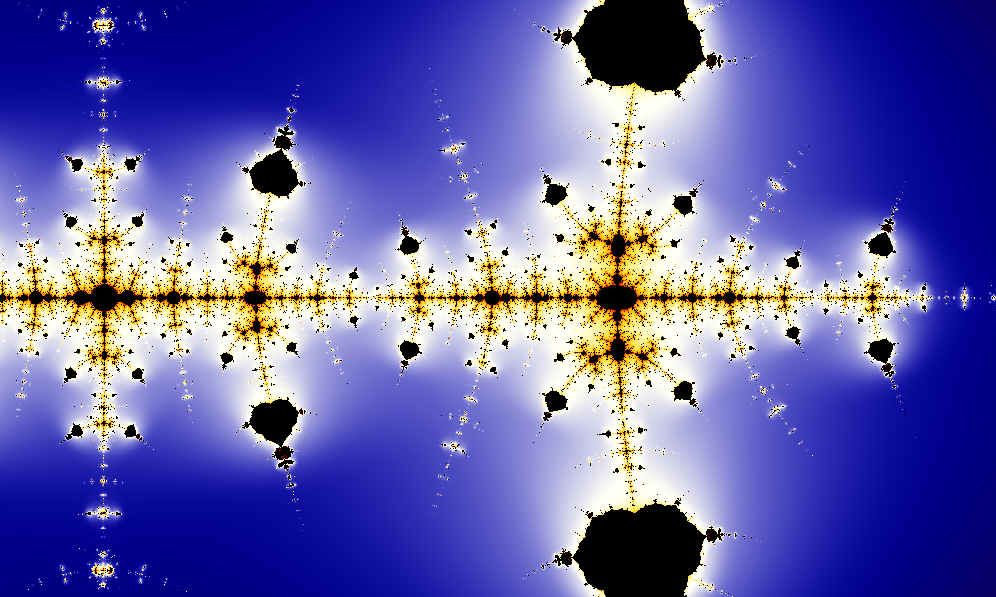
The Collatz conjecture: one way to illustrate its complexity is to extend the iteration from the natural numbers to the complex numbers. The result is a fractal, which (in accordance with universality) resembles the Mandelbrot set.

Nonetheless, there is some degree of empiricism and data collection involved in the discovery of mathematical theorems. By establishing a pattern, sometimes with the use of a powerful computer, mathematicians may have an idea of what to prove, and in some cases even a plan for how to set about doing the proof. It is also possible to find a single counter-example and so establish the impossibility of a proof for the proposition as-stated, and possibly suggest restricted forms of the original proposition that might have feasible proofs.

For example, both the Collatz conjecture and the Riemann hypothesis are well-known unsolved problems; they have been extensively studied through empirical checks, but remain unproven. The Collatz conjecture has been verified for start values up to about 2.88 × 10^{18}. The Riemann hypothesis has been verified to hold for the first 10 trillion non-trivial zeroes of the zeta function. Although most mathematicians can tolerate supposing that the conjecture and the hypothesis are true, neither of these propositions is considered proved.

Such evidence does not constitute proof. For example, the Mertens conjecture is a statement about natural numbers that is now known to be false, but no explicit counterexample (i.e., a natural number n for which the Mertens function M(n) equals or exceeds the square root of n) is known: all numbers less than 10^{14} have the Mertens property, and the smallest number that does not have this property is only known to be less than the exponential of 1.59 × 10^{40}, which is approximately 10 to the power 4.3 × 10^{39}. Since the number of particles in the universe is generally considered less than 10 to the power 100 (a googol), there is no hope to find an explicit counterexample by exhaustive search.

The word "theory" also exists in mathematics, to denote a body of mathematical axioms, definitions and theorems, as in, for example, group theory (see mathematical theory). There are also "theorems" in science, particularly physics, and in engineering, but they often have statements and proofs in which physical assumptions and intuition play an important role; the physical axioms on which such "theorems" are based are themselves falsifiable.

== Terminology ==
A number of different terms for mathematical statements exist; these terms indicate the role statements play in a particular subject. The distinction between different terms is sometimes rather arbitrary, and the usage of some terms has evolved over time.

- An axiom or postulate is a fundamental assumption regarding the object of study, that is accepted without proof. A related concept is that of a definition, which gives the meaning of a word or a phrase in terms of known concepts. Classical geometry discerns between axioms, which are general statements; and postulates, which are statements about geometrical objects. Historically, axioms were regarded as "self-evident"; today they are merely assumed to be true.
- A conjecture is an unproved statement that is believed to be true. Conjectures are usually made in public, and named after their maker (e.g. Goldbach's conjecture and Collatz conjecture). The term hypothesis is also used in this sense (e.g. Riemann hypothesis), which should not be confused with "hypothesis" as the premise of a proof. Other terms are also used on occasion, for example problem when people are not sure whether the statement should be believed to be true.
  - Sometimes the name of a problem in common use does not match what would be technically most correct. Fermat's Last Theorem was historically called a theorem, although, for centuries, it was only a conjecture. Conversely, the Poincaré conjecture is still generally referred to as a conjecture, despite having been proved in 2002.
- A theorem is a statement that has been proven to be true based on axioms and other theorems.
- A proposition is a theorem of lesser importance, or one that is considered so elementary or immediately obvious, that it may be stated without proof. This should not be confused with "proposition" as used in propositional logic. In classical geometry the term "proposition" was used differently: in Euclid's Elements (c. 300 BCE), all theorems and geometric constructions were called "propositions" regardless of their importance.
- A lemma is an "accessory proposition" — a proposition with little applicability outside its use in a particular proof. Over time a lemma may gain in importance and be considered a theorem, though the term "lemma" is usually kept as part of its name (e.g. Gauss's lemma, Zorn's lemma, and the fundamental lemma).
- A corollary is a proposition that follows immediately from another theorem or axiom, with little or no required proof. A corollary may also be a restatement of a theorem in a simpler form, or for a special case: for example, the theorem "all internal angles in a rectangle are right angles" has a corollary that "all internal angles in a square are right angles" — a square being a special case of a rectangle.
- A generalization of a theorem is a theorem with a similar statement but a broader scope, from which the original theorem can be deduced as a special case (a corollary). (Note: Often, when the less general or "corollary"-like theorem is proven first, it is because the proof of the more general form requires the simpler, corollary-like form, for use as a what is functionally a lemma, or "helper" theorem.)

Other terms may also be used for historical or customary reasons, for example:

- An identity is a theorem stating an equality between two expressions, that holds for any value within its domain (e.g. Bézout's identity and Vandermonde's identity).
- A rule is a theorem that establishes a useful formula (e.g. Bayes' rule and Cramer's rule).
- A law or principle is a theorem with wide applicability (e.g. the law of large numbers, law of cosines, Kolmogorov's zero–one law, Harnack's principle, the least-upper-bound principle, and the pigeonhole principle). (Note: The word law can also refer to an axiom, a rule of inference, or, in probability theory, a probability distribution.)

A few well-known theorems have even more idiosyncratic names, for example, the division algorithm, Euler's formula, and the Banach–Tarski paradox.

== Layout ==
In English language publications, a theorem (which is often classified as a proposition, lemma, or corollary and labeled as such) and its proof are typically laid out as follows:

Theorem. (Wiles, 1994) Let x, y, z, and n be integers such that x^{n} + y^{n} = z^{n} and n ≥ 3. Then xyz = 0.
Proof. [Beginning of proof]
[Continued text of proof]
[......................................]
[Continued text of proof] [End of proof]∎

The end of the proof may be signaled by the letters Q.E.D. (quod erat demonstrandum) or by one of the tombstone marks, such as "□" or "∎", meaning "end of proof", introduced by Paul Halmos following their use in magazines to mark the end of an article.

The exact style depends on the author or publication. Many publications provide instructions or macros for typesetting in the house style.

It is common for a theorem to be preceded by definitions describing the exact meaning of the terms used in the theorem. It is also common for a theorem to be preceded by a number of propositions or lemmas which are then used in the proof. However, lemmas are sometimes embedded in the proof of a theorem, either with nested proofs, or with their proofs presented after the proof of the theorem.

Corollaries to a theorem are either presented between the theorem and the proof, or directly after the proof. Sometimes, corollaries have proofs of their own that explain why they follow from the theorem.

== Lore ==
It has been estimated that over a quarter of a million theorems are proved every year.

The well-known aphorism, "A mathematician is a device for turning coffee into theorems", is probably due to Alfréd Rényi, although it is often attributed to Rényi's colleague Paul Erdős (and Rényi may have been thinking of Erdős), who was famous for the many theorems he produced, the number of his collaborations, and his coffee drinking.

The classification of finite simple groups is regarded by some to be the longest proof of a theorem. It comprises tens of thousands of pages in 500 journal articles by some 100 authors. These papers are together believed to give a complete proof, and several ongoing projects hope to shorten and simplify this proof. Another theorem of this type is the four color theorem whose computer generated proof is too long for a human to read.

== Theorems in logic ==
In mathematical logic, a formal theory is a set of sentences within a formal language. A sentence is a well-formed formula with no free variables. A sentence that is a member of a theory is one of its theorems, and the theory is the set of its theorems. Usually a theory is understood to be closed under the relation of logical consequence. Some accounts define a theory to be closed under the semantic consequence relation ($\models$), while others define it to be closed under the syntactic consequence, or derivability relation ($\vdash$).

This diagram shows the syntactic entities that can be constructed from formal languages. The symbols and strings of symbols may be broadly divided into nonsense and well-formed formulas. A formal language can be thought of as identical to the set of its well-formed formulas. The set of well-formed formulas may be broadly divided into theorems and non-theorems.

For a theory to be closed under a derivability relation, it must be associated with a deductive system that specifies how the theorems are derived. The deductive system may be stated explicitly, or it may be clear from the context. The closure of the empty set under the relation of logical consequence yields the set that contains just those sentences that are the theorems of the deductive system.

In the broad sense in which the term is used within logic, a theorem does not have to be true, since the theory that contains it may be unsound relative to a given semantics, or relative to the standard interpretation of the underlying language. A theory that is inconsistent has all sentences as theorems.

The definition of theorems as sentences of a formal language is useful within proof theory, which is a branch of mathematics that studies the structure of formal proofs and the structure of provable formulas. It is also important in model theory, which is concerned with the relationship between formal theories and structures that are able to provide a semantics for them through interpretation.

Although theorems may be uninterpreted sentences, in practice mathematicians are more interested in the meanings of the sentences, i.e. in the propositions they express. What makes formal theorems useful and interesting is that they may be interpreted as true propositions and their derivations may be interpreted as a proof of their truth. A theorem whose interpretation is a true statement about a formal system (as opposed to within a formal system) is called a metatheorem.

Some important theorems in mathematical logic are:

- Compactness of first-order logic
- Completeness of first-order logic
- Gödel's incompleteness theorems of first-order arithmetic
- Consistency of first-order arithmetic
- Tarski's undefinability theorem
- Church-Turing theorem of undecidability
- Löb's theorem
- Löwenheim–Skolem theorem
- Lindström's theorem
- Craig's theorem
- Cut-elimination theorem

=== Syntax and semantics ===
The concept of a formal theorem is fundamentally syntactic, in contrast to the notion of a true proposition, which introduces semantics. Different deductive systems can yield other interpretations, depending on the presumptions of the derivation rules (i.e. belief, justification or other modalities). The soundness of a formal system depends on whether or not all of its theorems are also validities. A validity is a formula that is true under any possible interpretation (for example, in classical propositional logic, validities are tautologies). A formal system is considered semantically complete when all of its theorems are also tautologies.

== See also ==
- Law (mathematics)
- List of theorems
- List of theorems called fundamental
- Formula
- Inference
- Toy theorem

== Citations ==
=== Works cited ===
- Boolos, George; Burgess, John; Jeffrey, Richard (2007). Computability and Logic (5th ed.). Cambridge University Press.
- Enderton, Herbert (2001). A Mathematical Introduction to Logic (2nd ed.). Harcourt Academic Press.
- Heath, Sir Thomas Little (1897). The works of Archimedes. Dover.
- Hedman, Shawn (2004). A First Course in Logic. Oxford University Press.
- Hinman, Peter (2005). Fundamentals of Mathematical Logic. Wellesley, MA: A K Peters.
- Hoffman, Paul (1998). The Man Who Loved Only Numbers: The Story of Paul Erdős and the Search for Mathematical Truth. Hyperion, New York. ISBN 1-85702-829-5.
- Hodges, Wilfrid (1993). Model Theory. Cambridge University Press.
- Johnstone, P. T. (1987). Notes on Logic and Set Theory. Cambridge University Press.
- Monk, J. Donald (1976). Mathematical Logic. Springer-Verlag.
- Petkovsek, Marko; Wilf, Herbert; Zeilberger, Doron (1996). A = B (PDF). A K Peters, Wellesley, Massachusetts. ISBN 1-56881-063-6.
- Rautenberg, Wolfgang (2010). A Concise Introduction to Mathematical Logic (3rd ed.). Springer.
- van Dalen, Dirk (1994). Logic and Structure (3rd ed.). Springer-Verlag.
- Wentworth, G.; Smith, D.E. (1913). Plane Geometry. Ginn & Co.
