= Affiliation =

Affiliation or affiliate may refer to:

- Affiliate (commerce), a legal form of entity relationship used in Business Law
- Affiliation (family law), a legal form of family relationship
- Affiliate marketing
- Affiliate network or affiliation platform, a website connecting advertisers and affiliates
- Affiliated trade union, in British politics, a trade union that has an affiliation to the British Labour Party
- Network affiliate, a relationship between broadcasting companies
- Need for affiliation, a person's need to feel a sense of involvement and "belonging" within a social group
- Political party affiliation
- Religious affiliation, see List of religions and spiritual traditions
- Social affiliation, see Tend and befriend
- Affiliated school
- Affiliated operator, in math
- Affiliated institution, similar to a consortium or trade association
- AffiliationQuebec a registered political party in Quebec
- Affiliating university
- Affiliated (album), 2006 rap album by MC Eiht
- "Affiliated", song by Bhad Bhabie from the 2018 mixtape 15

== See also ==
- Affiliate (novel), by Sergei Dovlatov (1987)
- Association (disambiguation)
