= Grupp =

Grupp is a surname. Notable people with the surname include:

- Bob Grupp (born 1955), American football punter
- Julian Grupp (born 1991), German footballer
- Stephan Grupp, American pediatric oncologist

== See also ==
- Group (disambiguation)
- Grup (disambiguation)
