= The Group (Canadian TV program) =

- Genre: Music
- Country of origin: Canada
- Original language: English
- No. of seasons: 3

Production
- Producer: Dale Nelson
- Production locations: CBWT Studios; Winnipeg, Manitoba
- Running time: 30 minutes

Original release
- Network: CBC Television
- Release: 23 June 1968 – 27 September 1970

The Group is a Canadian music variety television program that aired on CBC Television from 1968 to 1970.

== Premise ==
The program was produced in Winnipeg. regulars included Reg Gibson and Karen Marklinger, with the house band The Sassy Brass of Bob McMullin named after the program's musical director. Visiting performers included Lucille Emond, Anita Gass, Georges LaFleche, Ray St. Germain, Buddy Victor and Yvette.

== Scheduling ==
This half-hour program was broadcast on Sundays for three seasons as a mid-season replacement. It aired 23–28 June July 1968 at 7:00 p.m., after which the time slot featured Hits a Poppin until September. The remaining seasons aired 3 August to 14 September 1969 at 4:00 p.m. and finally 12 July – 27 September 1970 at 5:30 p.m.
