= Grup =

Grup may refer to:

- Grup Gerak Khas, a special forces regiment of the Malaysian Army
- ADD Grup, a developer and manufacturer of smart metering solutions
- Transferoviar Grup, a private railway company in Romania
- Grup, a term for grown-ups Star Trek episode "Miri"

== See also ==
- Group (disambiguation)
- Grupp, a surname
