= Religious community =

Religious community may refer to:

- Church (congregation), a Christian organization or congregation that meets in a particular location
- Confessional community, a group of people with similar religious beliefs
- Institute of consecrated life, an association of faithful in the Catholic Church to enable men or women who publicly profess the evangelical counsels by religious vows or other sacred bonds
- Religious identity, the sense of group membership to a religion and the importance of this group membership as it pertains to one's self-concept
- Religious intentional community, a residential community with a shared religious identity designed to have a high degree of group cohesiveness and teamwork
- Religious order, a subgroup within a larger confessional community with a distinctive high-religiosity lifestyle and clear membership

== See also ==
- Religious group (disambiguation)
