= Free association =

Free association may refer to:

- Free association (psychology), a technique of psychoanalysis devised by Sigmund Freud
- Free association (Marxism and anarchism), where there is no state, social class, authority, or private ownership of means of production
- Free association, where an associated state has a relationship with a nation
- Voluntary association, reflecting:
  - Freedom of association, a human right
- Free Association, a publication of the Japanese Anarchist Federation
- The Free Association, a London-based improv comedy theatre and school

== See also ==
- David Holmes Presents The Free Association, a 2002 album by David Holmes (musician)
