= Fundamental theorem of ideal theory in number fields =

Every nonzero proper ideal in the ring of integers of a number field factorizes uniquely

In number theory, the fundamental theorem of ideal theory in number fields states that every nonzero proper ideal in the ring of integers of a number field admits unique factorization into a product of nonzero prime ideals. In other words, every ring of integers of a number field is a Dedekind domain.
