= Religious group =

Religious group may refer to:

- Confessional community, a group of people with similar religious beliefs
- Ethnoreligious group, a group of people with a common religious and ethnic background
- Religious denomination, a subgroup within a religion that operates under a common name and tradition
- Religious organization, an organization that supports the practice of a religion

== See also ==
- Religious community (disambiguation)
