= Hits a Poppin =

- Genre: Music
- Written by: Bill Hartley
- Presented by: Terry David Mulligan
- Country of origin: Canada
- Original language: English
- No. of seasons: 1

Production
- Producer: Ken Gibson
- Running time: 30 minutes

Original release
- Network: CBC Television
- Release: 4 August – 1 September 1968

Hits a Poppin is a Canadian music television program that aired on CBC Television in 1968.

== Premise ==
Host Terry David Mulligan presented popular and theatrical songs. The regular performers were The Doug Parker Band and the Numerality Singers.

== Scheduling ==
This half-hour series was broadcast on Sundays at 7:00 p.m. from 4 August to 1 September 1968.
