= Symbols of grouping =

Symbols used in mathematical expressions

In mathematics and related subjects, understanding a mathematical expression depends on an understanding of symbols of grouping, such as parentheses (), square brackets [], and braces {} (see note on terminology below). These same symbols are also used in ways where they are not symbols of grouping. For example, in the expression 3(x+y) the parentheses are symbols of grouping, but in the expression (3, 5) the parentheses may indicate an open interval.

The most common symbols of grouping are the parentheses and the square brackets, and the latter are usually used to avoid too many repeated parentheses. For example, to indicate the product of binomials, parentheses are usually used, thus: $(2x+3)(3x+4)$. But if one of the binomials itself contains parentheses, as in $(2(a+b)+3)$ one or more pairs of () may be replaced by [], thus: $[2(a+b)+3][3x+4]$. Beyond elementary mathematics, [] are mostly used for other purposes, e.g. to denote a closed interval, or an equivalence class, so they appear rarely for grouping.

The usage of the word "brackets" varies from country. In the United States, the term denotes [], known elsewhere as "square brackets". In the United Kingdom and many other English-speaking countries, "brackets" means (), known in the US as "parentheses" (singular "parenthesis"). That said, the specific terms "parentheses" and "square brackets" are generally understood everywhere and may be used to avoid ambiguity.

The symbol of grouping knows as "braces" has two major uses. If two of these symbols are used, one on the left and the mirror image of it on the right, it almost always indicates a set, as in $\{a, b, c\}$, the set containing three members, $a$, $b$, and $c$. But if it is used only on the left, it groups two or more simultaneous equations or the cases of a piecewise-defined function.

There are other symbols of grouping. One is the bar above an expression, as in the square root sign in which the bar is a symbol of grouping. For example √p+q is the square root of the sum. The bar is also a symbol of grouping in repeated decimal digits. A decimal point followed by one or more digits with a bar over them, for example 0.1̅2̅3̅, represents the repeating decimal 0.123123123... . Another symbol of grouping is the horizontal bar of a fraction, for example $\frac{1}{2+3}$, which is thus evaluated to $\frac{1}{5}$.

A superscript is understood to be grouped as long as it continues in the form of a superscript. For example if an x has a superscript of the form a+b, the sum is the exponent. For example, in x^{2+3}, it is understood that the 2+3 is grouped, and that the exponent is the sum of 2 and 3.

These rules are understood by all mathematicians.

== The associative law ==
In most mathematics, the operations of addition and multiplication are associative.

The associative law for addition, for example, states that $(a + b) + c = a + (b + c)$. This means that once the associative law is stated, the parentheses are unnecessary and are usually omitted. More generally, any sum, of any number of terms, can be written without parentheses and any product, of any number of factors, can be written without parentheses.

== Hierarchy of operations ==
The "hierarchy of operations", also called the "order of operations" is a rule that saves needing an excessive number of symbols of grouping. In its simplest form, if a number had a plus sign on one side and a multiplication sign on the other side, the multiplication acts first. If we were to express this idea using symbols of grouping, the factors in a product. Example: 2+3×4 = 2 +(3×4)=2+12=14.

In understanding expressions without symbols of grouping, it is useful to think of subtraction as addition of the opposite, and to think of division as multiplication by the reciprocal.
