= Associate =

Associate may refer to:

== Academics ==
- Associate degree, a two-year or three-year educational degree in the United States, and some areas of Canada
- Associate professor, an academic rank at a college or university
- Technical associate or Senmonshi, a Japanese educational degree
- Associate of the Royal College of Science, an honorary degree-equivalent award presented by Imperial College London
- Teaching associate, an academic teaching position usually requiring a graduate degree
- Research associate, an academic research position usually requiring a graduate degree

== Business ==
- Employee
- Business partner
- Associate, an independent (often self-employed) person working as if directly employed by a company
- Associate company, an accounting and business valuation concept
- Coworker, a partner or colleague in business or at work.

== Health care ==
- Clinical research associate (CRA), a clinical trial monitor which oversees the conduct of clinical trials in study sites and helps protecting study subjects rights and safety
- Clinical Associate (Psychology), a specialist regulated mental health professional in Scotland
- Clinical associates, a category of healthcare providers in South Africa

== Law ==
- Associate attorney, an employee lawyer in a traditional United States law firm
- Associate justice, a member of a judicial panel who is not the chief justice
- Judge's associate, an assistant to a judge in an Australian court (akin to a judge's clerk in an American court)

== Entertainment ==
- The Associates (band), a Scottish post-punk and New Wave band of the early 1980s
- The Associate (1946 film), a Mexican drama film
- The Associate (1979 film), a comedy film directed by René Gainville
- The Associate (1996 film), a film starring Whoopi Goldberg
  - The Associate (soundtrack), a 1996 original soundtrack album
- The Associate (novel), a 2009 novel by John Grisham
- The Associates (U.S. TV series), an American sitcom in 1979 and 1980
- The Associates (Canadian TV series), a Canadian drama TV series in 2001 and 2002

== Other uses ==
- Associate, to form an Association or connection between two or more concepts in the mind or imagination
- Associate (ring theory), a mathematical concept
- Associate, a person who is in league with the Mafia but is not a made man (full member)

== See also ==
- Association (disambiguation)
