= Association =

Association may refer to:

== Types of groups of people ==
- Club (organization), an association of two or more people united by a common interest or goal
- Trade association, an organization founded and funded by businesses that operate in a specific industry
- Voluntary association, a body formed by individuals to accomplish a purpose, usually as volunteers
- Non profit association, a body formed by individuals to accomplish a purpose without any profit interest
- Collaboration, the act of working together
- Professional association, typically nonprofit organization seeking to further a particular profession

== Topics in various fields of study ==
- Association (archaeology), the close relationship between objects or contexts.
- Association (astronomy), combined or co-added group of astronomical exposures
- Association (chemistry)
- Association (ecology), a type of ecological community
- Genetic association, when one or more genotypes within a population co-occur
- Association (object-oriented programming), defines a relationship between classes of objects
- Association (psychology), a connection between two or more concepts in the mind or imagination
- Association (statistics), a statistical relationship between two variables
- File association, associates a file with a software application
- Security association, the establishment of security attributes between two communication networks

== Particular entities ==
- Association of Mary, Queen of Scots, and James VI, a plan for the conjoint rule in Scotland of Mary, Queen of Scots and James VI.
- Continental Association, often called the "Association", an economic boycott during the American Revolution
- HMS Association (1697), a Royal Navy ship which sank in 1707
- L'Association, a French comic book publisher
- The Association, an American soft rock band
  - The Association (album), 1969

== See also ==
- Associate (disambiguation)
- Free association (disambiguation)
- Associative property in mathematics
- Interpersonal relationship
- Friendship
- Association football
- Registered association (Germany) (An eingetragener Verein)
