= List of Major National Historical and Cultural Sites in Inner Mongolia =

This list is of Major Sites Protected for their Historical and Cultural Value at the National Level in the autonomous region of Inner Mongolia, People's Republic of China.

Site	Chinese name	Location	Designation	Image
Upper Capital of the Liao dynasty	Liao shangjing yizhi 辽上京遗址	Bairin Left Banner; 43°57′53″N 119°23′34″E	1-159	Upload file
Middle Capital of the Liao dynasty	Liao zhongjing yizhi 辽中京遗址	Ningcheng County	1-160	Upload file
Wanbu Huayanjing Pagoda	Wanbu Huayanjing ta 万部华严经塔	Hohhot; 40°50′40″N 111°53′38″E	2-18	Upload file
Mausoleum of Genghis Khan	Chengjisi han ling 成吉思汗陵	Ejin Horo Banner; 39°22′16″N 109°46′46″E	2-62	Upload file
Five Pagoda Temple	Jingang zuo sheli baota 金刚座舍利宝塔	Hohhot; 40°47′55″N 111°39′27″E	3-158	Upload file
Dayao Site	Dayao yizhi 大窑遗址	Hohhot	3-187	Upload file
Juyan ruins	Juyan yizhi 居延遗址	Ejin Banner, Jinta County (Gansu)	3-209	Upload file
Gaxian Cave	Gaxiandong xizhi 嘎仙洞遗址	Oroqin Autonomous Banner	3-214	Upload file
Shangdu of Yuan Dynasty	Yuan Shangdu yizhi 元上都遗址	Plain Blue Banner	3-220	Upload file
Liao Dynasty Mausoleum and Fenglingyi	Liaoling ji Fengling yi 辽陵及奉陵邑	Bairin Left Banner	3-247	Upload file
Xinglongwa site	Xinglongwa yizhi 兴隆洼遗址	Aohan Banner	4-6	Upload file
Dadianzi site	Dadianzi yizhi 大甸子遗址	Aohan Banner	4-22	Upload file
Guyang Qin Great Wall	Guyang Qin changcheng yizhi 固阳秦长城遗址	Guyang County	4-34	Upload file
Gangwa Kiln Site	Gangwa yao yizhi 缸瓦窑遗址	Chifeng	4-54	Upload file
Aolunsumu city ruins	Aolunsumu cheng yizhi 敖伦苏木城遗址	Darhan Muminggan United Banner	4-56	Upload file
Meidaizhao Monastery	Meidaizhao 美岱召	Tumed Right Banner	4-135	Upload file
Badekar Monastery	Wudang zhao 五当召	Baotou	4-169	Upload file
Salawusu Site	Salawusu yizhi 萨拉乌苏遗址	Uxin Banner	5-13	Upload file
Daihai Sites	Daihai yizhi qun 岱海遗址群	Liangcheng County	5-14	Upload file
Miaozigou Site	Miaozigou yizhi 庙子沟遗址	Chahar Right Front Banner	5-15	Upload file
Jiazishan Sites	Jiazishan yizhi qun 架子山遗址群	Harqin Banner	5-16	Upload file
Dajing Copper Mine and Smelting Works	Dajing gu tongkuang yizhi 大井古铜矿遗址	Linxi County	5-17	Upload file
Chengzishan Site	Chengzi shan yizhi 城子山遗址	Aohan Banner	5-18	Upload file
Horinger Tuchengzi ruins	Helin Ge'er Tuchengzi yizhi 和林格尔土城子遗址	Horinger County	5-19	Upload file
Heishantou ruins	Heishantou chengzhi 黑山头城址	Ergun	5-20	Upload file
Jin Dynasty Earth Boundary Wall	Jin jiehao yizhi 金界壕遗址	Hulunbuir, Hinggan League, Tongliao, Chifeng, Ulanqab, Baotou; in Heilongjiang, Gannan County, Longjiang County, Qiqihar	5-21	Upload file
Yingchang Circuit ruins	Yingchanglu gucheng yizhi 应昌路故城遗址	Hexigten Banner	5-22	Upload file
Baoshan Tombs, Hansumu Tombs	Baoshan, Hansumu muqun 宝山、罕苏木墓群	Ar Horqin Banner	5-154	Upload file
Huizong Lamasery	Huizong si 汇宗寺	Duolun County	5-277	Upload file
Fuhui Temple	Fuhui si 福会寺	Harqin Banner	5-278	Upload file
Princes Residence and Ancestral Temple of Harqin	Kalaqin qinwang fu ji jiamiao 喀喇沁亲王府及家庙	Harqin Banner	5-279	Upload file
Residence of Princess Heshuo Kejing	Heshuo Kejing gongzhu fu 和硕恪靖公主府	Hohhot; 40°50′19″N 111°39′15″E	5-280	Upload file
Kailu County Buddhist Pagoda	Kailu xian Fota 开鲁县佛塔	Kailu County	5-281	Upload file
Nalinta Qin Great Wall	Changcheng - Nalinta Qinguo changcheng yizhi 长城—纳林塔秦国长城遗址	Ejin Horo Banner	5-442(2)	Upload file
Qingshuihe Great Wall	Changcheng - Qingshuihe xian changcheng 长城—清水河县长城	Qingshuihe County	5-442(8)	Upload file
Arjai Caves	Baiyanyao shiku 百眼窑石窟 Or, literal transcription: A'erzhai shiku 阿尔寨石窟	Otog Banner	5-520	Upload file
Ashan Site	Ashan yizhi 阿善遗址	Baotou	6-27	Upload file
Zhaobaogou site	Zhaobaogou yizhi 赵宝沟遗址	Aohan Banner	6-28	Upload file
Hongshan culture sites	Hongshan yizhi qun 红山遗址群	Chifeng	6-29	Upload file
Xiajiadian sites	Xiajiadian yizhi qun 夏家店遗址群	Chifeng	6-30	Upload file
Zhukaigou site	Zhukaigou yizhi 朱开沟遗址	Ejin Horo Banner	6-31	Upload file
Straight Road of Qin	Qin zhidao yizhi 秦直道遗址	Ordos	6-32	Upload file
Machi ruins and Zhaowan tombs	Machi chengzhi he Zhaowan muqun 麻池城址和召湾墓群	Baotou	6-33	Upload file
Heicheng Site	Heicheng yizhi 黑城城址	Ningcheng County	6-34	Upload file
Shuofang Commandery ruins	Shuofang jun gucheng 朔方郡故城	Dengkou County	6-35	Upload file
Huoluochaideng ruins	Huoluochaideng chengzhi 霍洛柴登城址	Hanggin Banner	6-36	Upload file
Kelimeng ruins	Kelimeng chengzhi 克里孟城址	Chahar Right Back Banner	6-37	Upload file
Woyezhen ruins	Woye zhen gucheng 沃野镇故城	Urat Front Banner	6-38	Upload file
Bailing Nur ruins	Bailing nao'er chengzhi 白灵淖尔城址	Guyang County	6-39	Upload file
Shi'erliancheng ruins	Shi'erliancheng chengzhi 十二连城城址	Jungar Banner	6-40	Upload file
Chengchuan ruins	Chengchuan chengzhi 城川城址	Otog Front Banner	6-41	Upload file
Chaganhaote ruins	Chagan haote chengzhi 查干浩特城址	Ar Horqin Banner	6-42	Upload file
Andabaozi ruins	Andabaozi chengzhi 安答堡子城址	Darhan Muminggan United Banner	6-43	Upload file
Jingzhou Circuit ruins	Jingzhoulu gucheng 净州路故城	Siziwang Banner	6-44	Upload file
Zongguan-Fu of Shajing Circuit ruins	Shajinglu zongguan fu gucheng 砂井路总管府故城	Siziwang Banner	6-45	Upload file
Bayanwula ruins	Bayanwula chengzhi 巴彦乌拉城址	Evenk Autonomous Banner	6-46	Upload file
Zhalai Nur tombs	Zhalai nuo'er muqun 扎赉诺尔墓群	Manzhouli	6-236	Upload file
Tomb of Wang Zhaojun	Wang Zhaojun mu 王昭君墓	Hohhot; 40°42′54″N 111°41′24″E	6-237	Upload file
Han Kuangsi Family cemetery	Han Kuangsi jiazu mudi 韩匡嗣家族墓地	Bairin Left Banner	6-238	Upload file
Tu'erjishan Tomb	Tu'erjishan mu 吐尔基山墓	Horqin Left Back Banner	6-239	Upload file
Xiao Family Tombs	Xiaoshi jiazu mu 萧氏家族墓	Naiman Banner	6-240	Upload file
Zhang Yingrui Family cemetery	Zhang Yingrui jiazu mudi 张应瑞家族墓地	Ongniud Banner	6-241	Upload file
Jinshan Longquan Temple	Jinshan longquan si 锦山龙泉寺	Harqin Banner	6-487	Upload file
Dazhao Temple	Dazhao 大召	Hohhot; 40°47′53″N 111°38′48″E	6-488	Upload file
Suiyuan City Wall and General's Quarters	Suiyuan chengqiang he jiangjun yashu 绥远城墙和将军衙署	Hohhot	6-489	Upload file
Beizi Temple	Beizi miao 贝子庙	Xilinhot	6-490	Upload file
Dingyuanying	Dingyuanying 定远营	Alxa Left Banner	6-491	Upload file
Lingyue Temple	Lingyue si 灵悦寺	Harqin Banner	6-492	Upload file
Old Architecture of Nuo'er	Nuo'er gu jianzhu qun 诺尔古建筑群	Duolun County	6-493	Upload file
Three Great Temples of Hure	Kulun san da si 库伦三大寺	Hure Banner	6-494	Upload file
Palace of Sengge Rinchen	Senggelinqin wangfu 僧格林沁王府	Horqin Left Back Banner	6-495	Upload file
Baoshan Temple	Baoshan si 宝善寺	Ar Horqin Banner	6-496	Upload file
Yinshan Petroglyphs	Yin Shan yanhua 阴山岩画	Urat Front Banner, Urat Rear Banner, Urat Middle Banner, Dengkou County	6-818	Upload file
Zhenjizhisi Caves	Zhenji zhi si shiku 真寂之寺石窟	Bairin Left Banner	6-819	Upload file
Former Residence of Ulanhu	Wulanfu guju 乌兰夫故居	Tumed Left Banner	6-909	Upload file
Genghis Khan Temple	Chengjisi han miao 成吉思汗庙	Ulan Hot	6-910	Upload file
Site of the Duguilang Movement	"Duguilong" yundong jiuzhi "独贵龙"运动旧址	Uxin Banner	6-911	Upload file
Site of the Bailingmiao Uprising	Bailingmiao qiyi jiuzhi 百灵庙起义旧址	Darhan Muminggan United Banner	6-912	Upload file
Site of the Conference for the Foundation of the Autonomous Government of Inner Mongolia	Neimenggu zizhi zhengfu chengli dahui huizhi 内蒙古自治政府成立大会会址	Ulan Hot	6-913	Upload file

== See also ==
- Principles for the Conservation of Heritage Sites in China
