= Meidaizhao Monastery =

Tibetan Buddhist temple in Inner Mongolia, China

- 美岱召
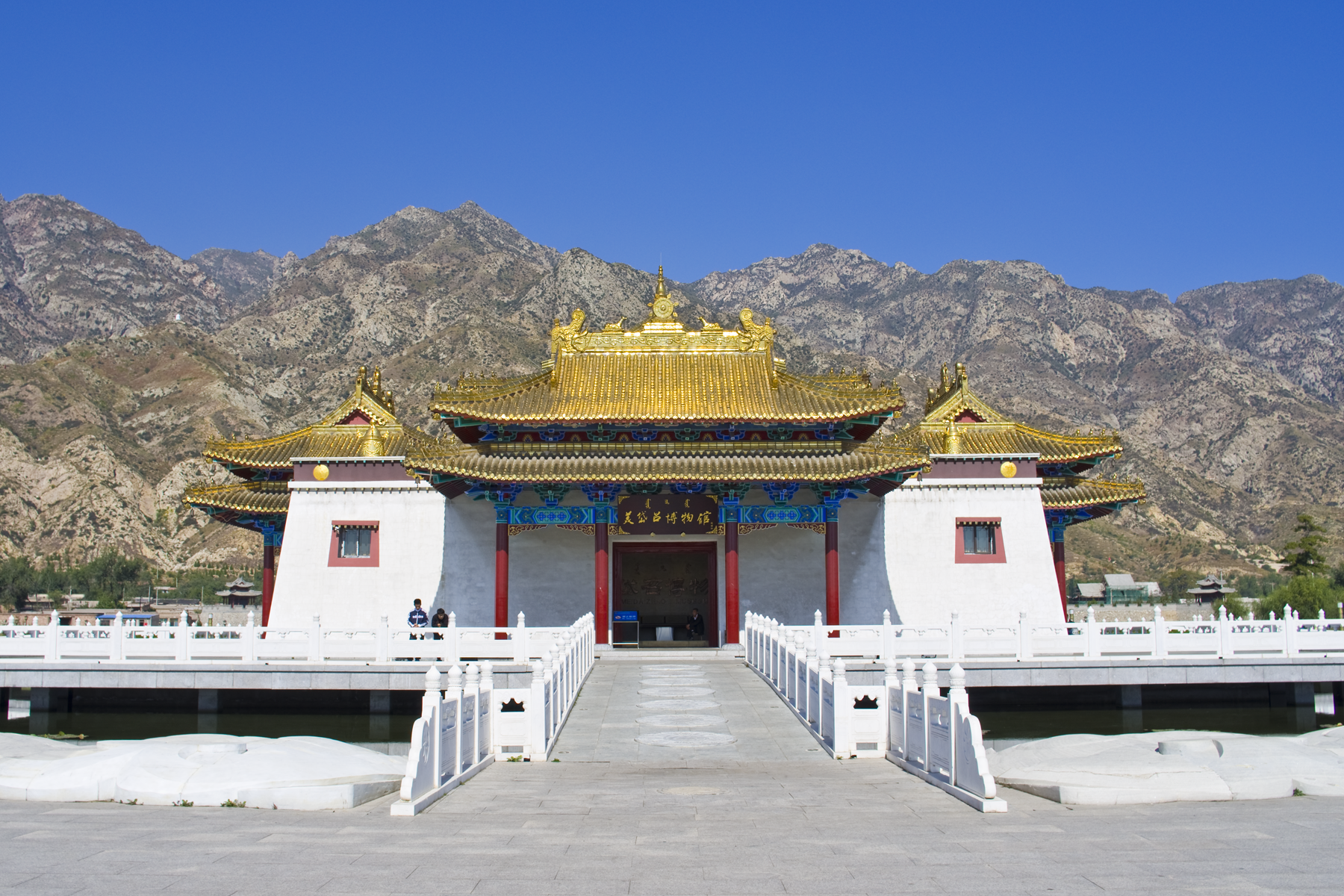
- Museum of Meidaizhao.

- Location within Inner Mongolia

Religion
- Affiliation: Buddhism
- Deity: Tibetan Buddhism-Gelug

Location
- Location: Tumed Right Banner, Baotou, Inner Mongolia
- Country: China
- Interactive map of Meidaizhao Monastery
- Coordinates: 40°36′36″N 110°42′59″E

Architecture
- Style: Chinese architecture
- Founder: Altan Khan
- Funded by: Maitreya Khutukhtu
- Established: 16th century
- Completed: 1575

Meidaizhao Monastery or Meidaizhao Lamasery (Chinese: 美岱召; pinyin: Meǐdaìzhāo) is a Tibetan Buddhist temple located in Tumed Right Banner, Baotou, Inner Mongolia, China.

== Name ==
"Zhao" (召) means "monastery" in Tibetan language.

== History ==
After the fall of the Yuan dynasty (1271–1368), the Mongols retreated to the north, historically known as "Northern Yuan dynasty" (1368–1635).

During the Longqing period (1567–1573) of the Ming dynasty (1368–1644), Altan Khan, the leader of a Mongolian tribe named Tümed, was canonized as "King of Shunyi" (顺义王) by the central government of the Ming Empire, and then he started to build monastery towns on mountains belonging to the Tümed. In 1575, the first monastery was completed, which was called "Shouling Monastery" (寿灵寺) in the early Qing dynasty (1644–1911) and later was granted a name of "Fuhua Town" (福化城) by the government.

In 1606, Erketü Qatun invited a Tibetan living Buddha named Maitreya Khutukhtu (迈达里·胡图克图) to come to the prairie to preach, and he also presided over Buddhist activities in Shouling Monastery. To commemorate Maitreya Khutukhtu's achievements, the local people changed its name to "Maitreya Monastery" or "Meidaizhao Monastery".

During the Cultural Revolution (1966–1976), a hall was demolished by the Red Guards and the monastery was used as a granary.

In 1996, it was listed among the fourth group of "Major National Historical and Cultural Sites in Inner Mongolia" by the State Council of China.

== Architecture ==
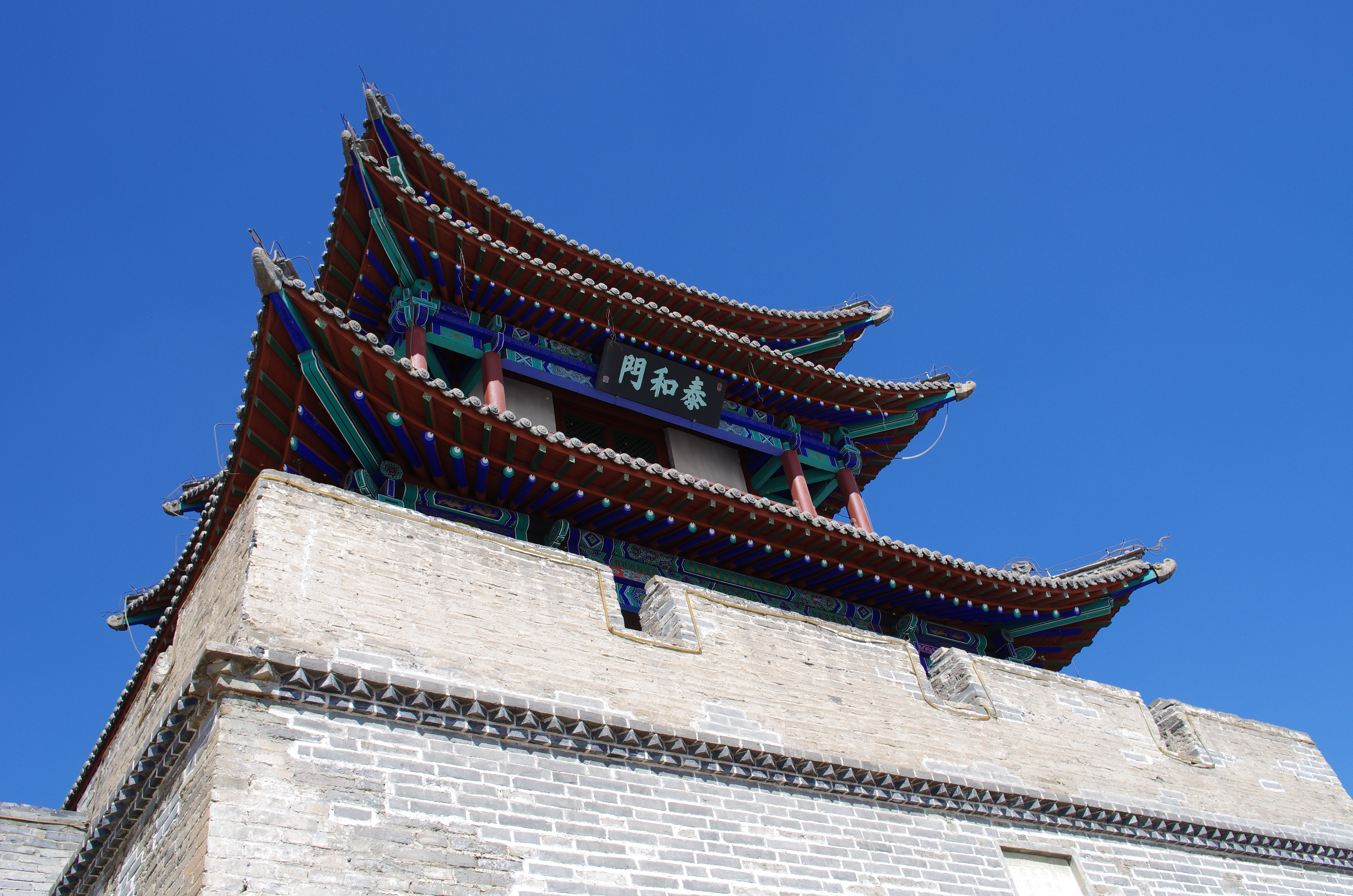
Taihe Tower.

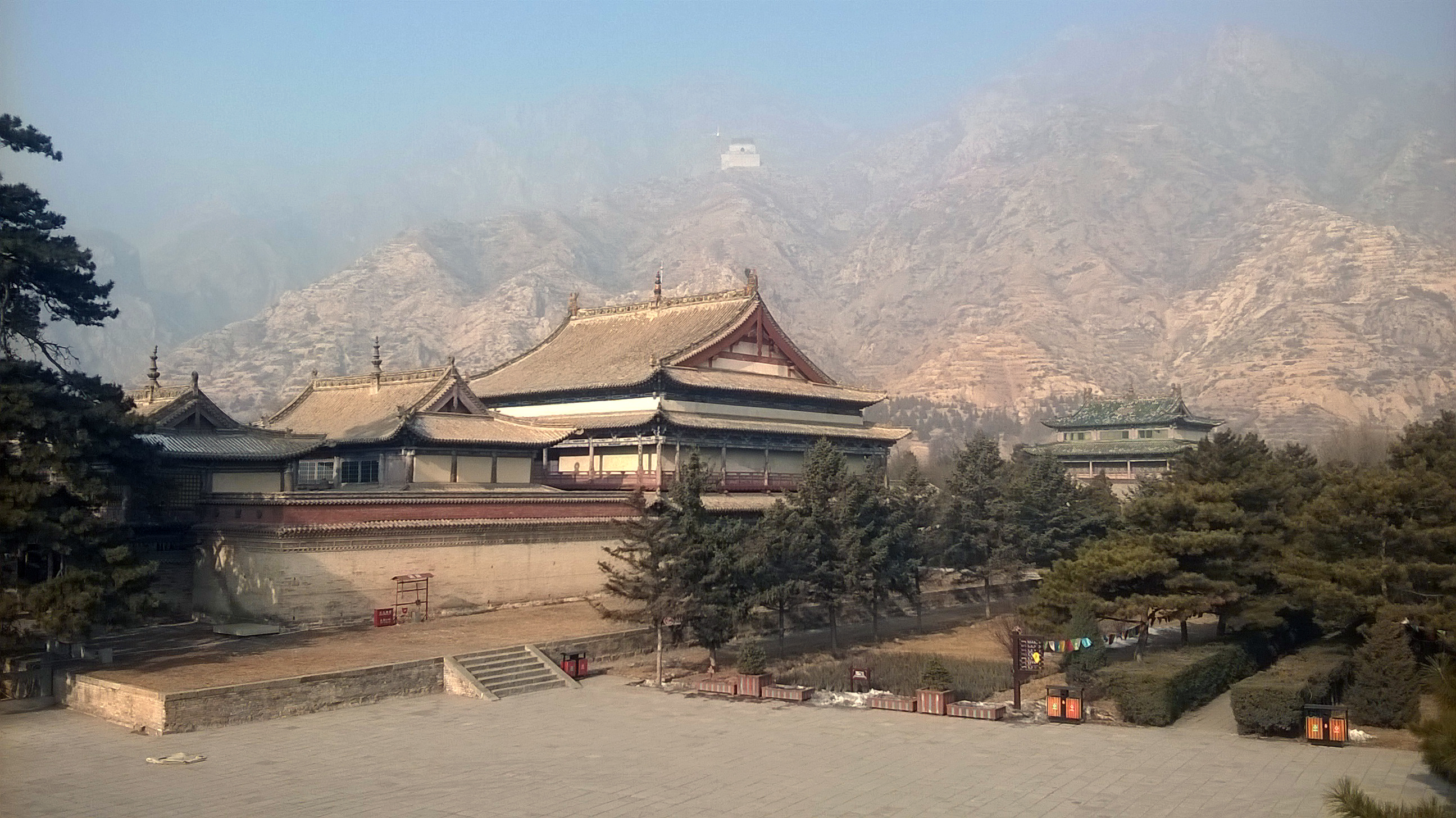
The Mahavira Hall and Liuli Hall.

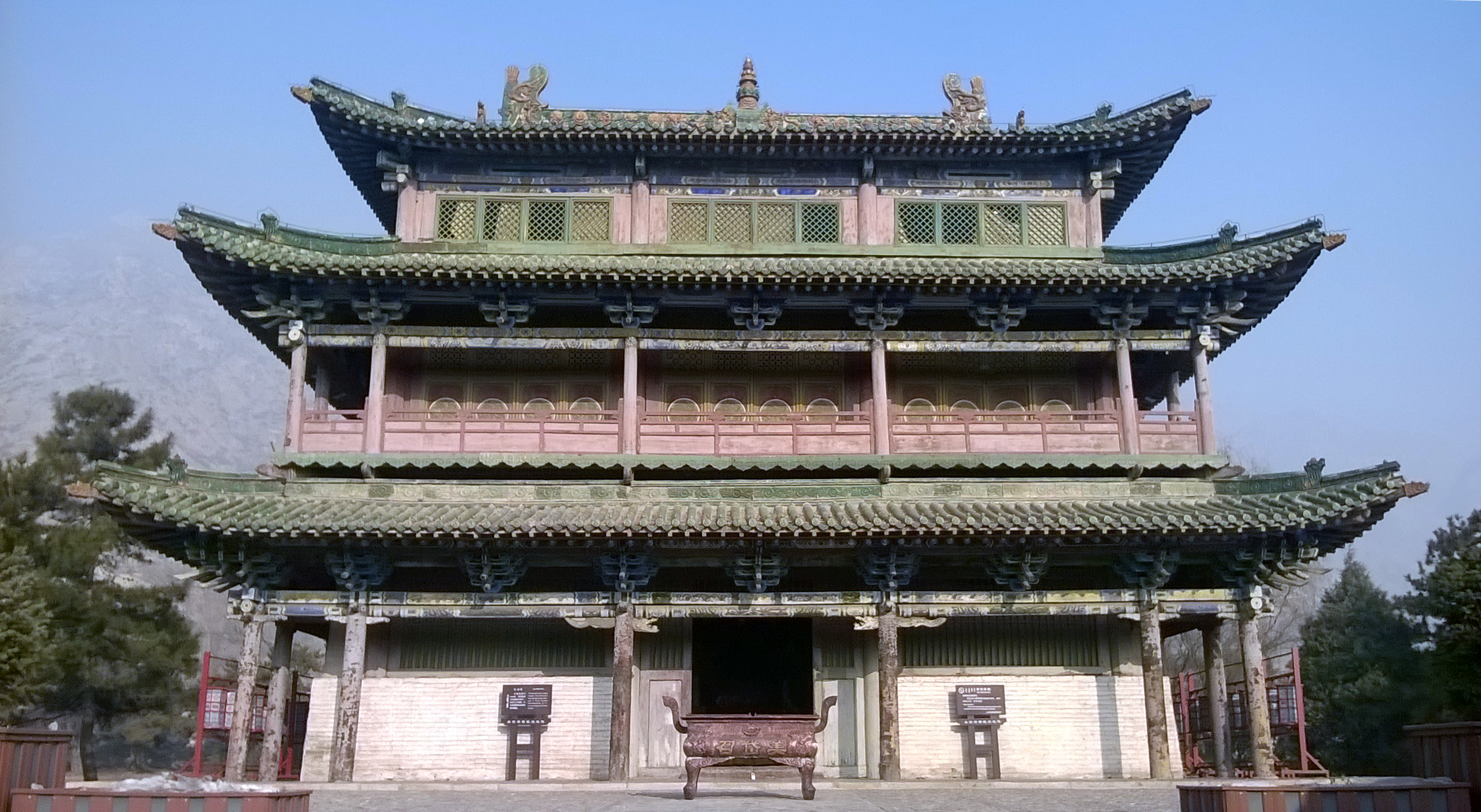
The frontal view of Liuli Hall.

Meidaizhao Monastery is a grand temple complex integrating monasteries, mansions and towns. It is a combination of Tibetan, Mongolian and Han Chinese architectural style. The extant buildings include the Taihe Tower (泰和门), Mahavira Hall, Liuli Hall (琉璃殿), Naiqiong Monastery (乃琼庙), Taihou Monastery (太后庙; 'Monastery of the Empress Dowager'), Dailai Monastery (达赖庙; 'Monastery of Dalai Lama'), Caishen Monastery (财神庙; 'Monastery of the God of Wealth'), etc.

=== Ancient Wall ===
The ancient wall is 681 metres (2,234 ft) long and about 4 metres (13 ft) high.

=== Taihe Tower ===
The Taihe Tower is a triple eaves gable and hip roof building (三檐歇山顶). It was first built in 1606 and rebuilt in 1985. In the center of the eaves of the hall is a plaque, on which there are the words "黄图巩固，帝道咸宁，万民乐业，四海澄清".

=== Mahavira Hall ===
The Mahavira Hall is situated in the north of the Taihe Tower with double eaves gable and hip roof (重檐歇山顶). It is 43.7 metres (143 ft) deep and 23.2 metres (76 ft) wide. On the walls are paintings with stories of Sakyamuni's becoming Buddha, which are bright in color, fluent in lines and with the style of Tibetan frescos.

=== Taihou Monastery ===
The Taihou Monastery (太后庙; 'Monastery of the Empress Dowager') is situated in the northeast of the Mahavira Hall with double eaves gable and hip roof (重檐歇山顶). The monastery enshrines a sandalwood pagoda that preserves the ashes of Erketü Qatun, the Empress Dowager of Tümed.

== See also ==
- List of Major National Historical and Cultural Sites in Inner Mongolia
