= Shiguai District =

Shiguai 石拐区 • ᠰᠢᠭᠤᠶᠢᠲᠤ ᠲᠣᠭᠣᠷᠢᠭ Xiguit
- District
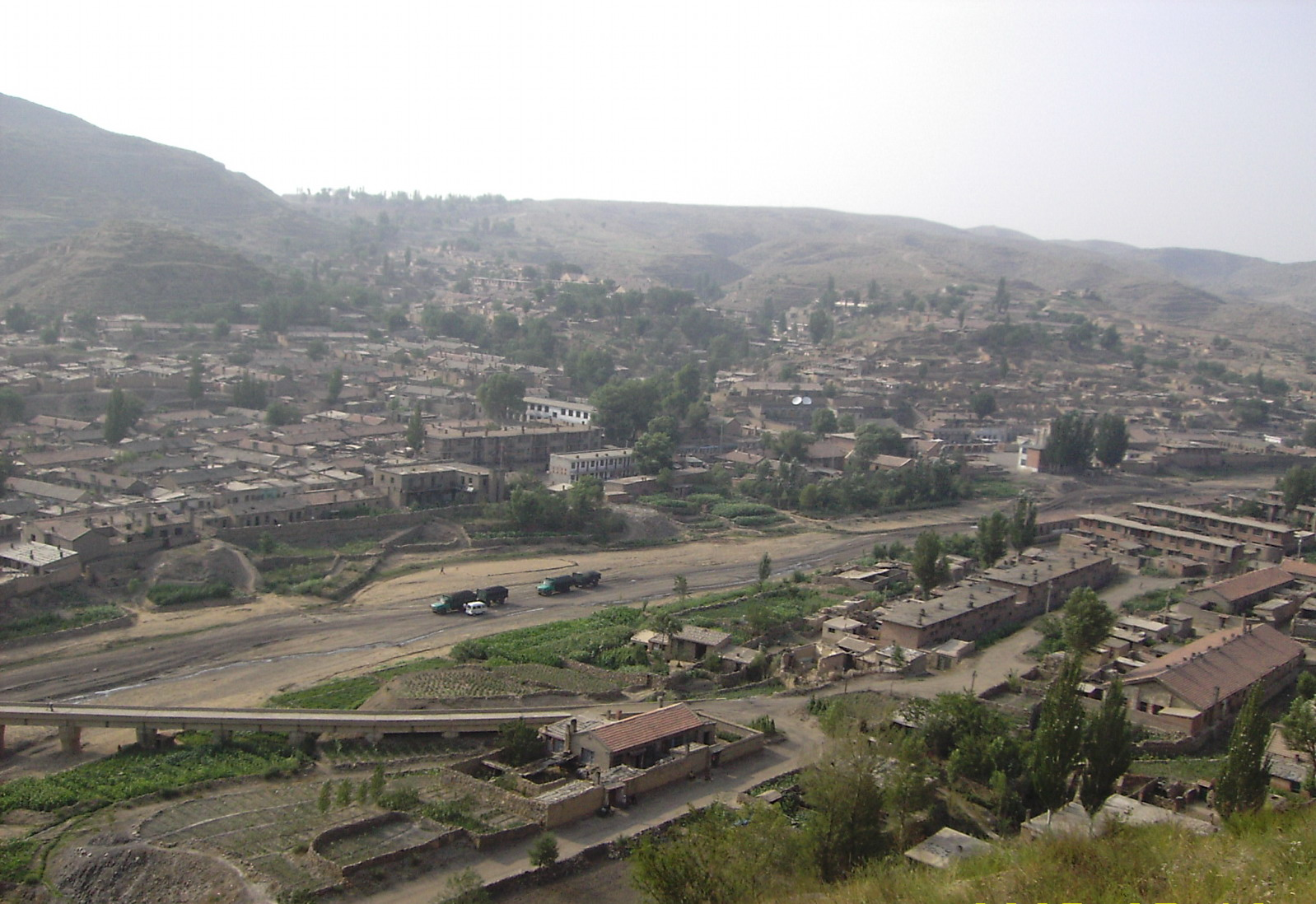

- Location within Inner Mongolia Location within China
- Coordinates: 40°40′19″N 110°16′19″E
- Country: China
- Autonomous region: Inner Mongolia
- Prefecture-level city: Baotou
- District seat: Dadeheng Subdistrict

Area
  - Total: 775.4 km^{2} (299.4 sq mi)
- Elevation: 1,218 m (3,996 ft)

Population (2020)
  - Total: 24,745
  - Density: 31.91/km^{2} (82.65/sq mi)
- Time zone: UTC+8 (China Standard)
- Website: www.shiguai.gov.cn

Shiguai District

Chinese name
- Simplified Chinese: 石拐区
- Traditional Chinese: 石拐區
Transcriptions
Standard Mandarin
- Hanyu Pinyin: Shíguǎi Qū

Mongolian name
- Mongolian Cyrillic: Шугуйт дүүрэг
- Mongolian script: ᠰᠢᠭᠤᠶᠢᠲᠤ ᠲᠣᠭᠣᠷᠢᠭ
Transcriptions
- SASM/GNC: Siɣuyitu toɣoriɣ

Shiguai District or Xiguit District (Chinese: 石拐区; Mongolian: ᠰᠢᠭᠤᠶᠢᠲᠤ ᠲᠣᠭᠣᠷᠢᠭ) is an outlying district of Baotou, the largest city of Inner Mongolia, China.

The district is home to Badekar Monastery and the national park that surrounds it.

== Administrative divisions ==
Shiguai District is made up of 6 subdistricts, 1 town, and 1 sum.

Name	Simplified Chinese	Hanyu Pinyin	Mongolian (Hudum Script)	Mongolian (Cyrillic)	Administrative division code
Subdistricts
Shiguai Subdistrict (Xiguit Subdistrict)	石拐街道	Shíguǎi Jiēdào	ᠰᠢᠭᠤᠢᠲᠤ ᠵᠡᠭᠡᠯᠢ ᠭᠤᠳᠤᠮᠵᠢ	Шугуйт зээл гудамж	150205001
Dafa Subdistrict	大发街道	Dàfā Jiēdào	ᠳ᠋ᠠ ᠹᠠ ᠵᠡᠭᠡᠯᠢ ᠭᠤᠳᠤᠮᠵᠢ	Да фа зээл гудамж	150205002
Daci Subdistrict	大磁街道	Dàcí Jiēdào	ᠳ᠋ᠠ ᠼᠢ ᠵᠡᠭᠡᠯᠢ ᠭᠤᠳᠤᠮᠵᠢ	Да ц зээл гудамж	150205003
Wudanggou Subdistrict	五当沟街道	Wǔdānggōu Jiēdào	ᠤᠳᠠᠨ ᠭᠤᠤ ᠵᠡᠭᠡᠯᠢ ᠭᠤᠳᠤᠮᠵᠢ	Удан гуу зээл гудамж	150205004
Baihugou Subdistrict	白狐沟街道	Báihúgōu Jiēdào	ᠪᠠᠢ ᠬᠤ ᠭᠧᠦ ᠵᠡᠭᠡᠯᠢ ᠭᠤᠳᠤᠮᠵᠢ	Бай хоо гүү зээл гудамж	150205005
Dadeheng Subdistrict	大德恒街道	Dàdéhéng Jiēdào	ᠳ᠋ᠠ ᠳ᠋ᠧ ᠾᠧᠩ ᠵᠡᠭᠡᠯᠢ ᠭᠤᠳᠤᠮᠵᠢ	Да те хэн зээл гудамж	150205006
Town
Badkar Sum Town (Wudangzhao Town)	五当召镇	Wǔdāngzhào Zhèn	ᠪᠠᠳᠺᠠᠷ ᠰᠦᠮ᠎ᠡ ᠪᠠᠯᠭᠠᠰᠤ	Баткар сүм балгас	150205101
Sum
Jabhlangt Sum	吉忽伦图苏木	Jíhūlúntú Sūmù	ᠵᠢᠪᠬᠤᠯᠠᠩᠲᠤ ᠰᠤᠮᠤ	Жавхлант сум	150205202

- Other:
  - Industrial Park Management Committee (工业园区管理委员会)
