= Binhe District =

Binhe
- District
- Country: People's Republic of China
- Region: Inner Mongolia
- Prefecture-level city: Baotou
- Time zone: UTC+8 (China Standard)

Binhe District is a district of Baotou, the largest city of Inner Mongolia, People's Republic of China.
