= Jiuyuan District =

Jiuyuan 九原区 • ᠵᠢᠦ ᠶᠤᠸᠠᠨ ᠲᠣᠭᠣᠷᠢᠭ
- District
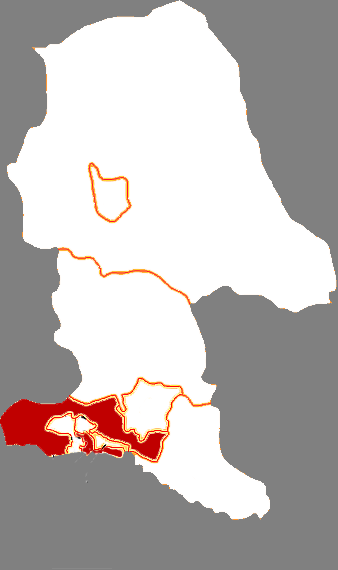
- Jiuyuan County in Baotou

- Location within Inner Mongolia Location within China
- Coordinates: 40°36′20″N 109°57′54″E
- Country: China
- Autonomous region: Inner Mongolia
- Prefecture-level city: Baotou
- District seat: Shahe Subdistrict

Area
  - Total: 686.3 km^{2} (265.0 sq mi)
- Elevation: 1,052 m (3,451 ft)

Population (2020)
  - Total: 245,190
  - Density: 357.3/km^{2} (925.3/sq mi)
- Time zone: UTC+8 (China Standard)
- Website: www.jiuyuanqu.gov.cn

Jiuyuan District

Chinese name
- Simplified Chinese: 九原区
- Traditional Chinese: 九原區
Transcriptions
Standard Mandarin
- Hanyu Pinyin: Jiǔyuán Qū

Mongolian name
- Mongolian Cyrillic: Жиуюань дүүрэг
- Mongolian script: ᠵᠢᠦ ᠶᠤᠸᠠᠨ ᠲᠣᠭᠣᠷᠢᠭ
Transcriptions
- SASM/GNC: Jiü yuvan toɣoriɣ

Jiuyuan District (Note: Chinese: 九原区; pinyin: Jiǔyuán Qū; Mongolian: ᠵᠢᠦ ᠶᠤᠸᠠᠨ ᠲᠣᠭᠣᠷᠢᠭ) is a district of Baotou, the second-largest city of Inner Mongolia, China.

== Administrative divisions ==
Jiuyuan District is made up of 4 subdistricts, 3 towns, and 1 sum.

Name	Simplified Chinese	Hanyu Pinyin	Mongolian (Hudum Script)	Mongolian (Cyrillic)	Administrative division code
Subdistricts
Shahe Subdistrict	沙河街道	Shāhé Jiēdào	ᠱᠠ ᠾᠧ ᠵᠡᠭᠡᠯᠢ ᠭᠤᠳᠤᠮᠵᠢ	Шаа ге зээл гудамж	150207001
Saihan Subdistrict	赛汗街道	Sàihàn Jiēdào	ᠰᠠᠢᠬᠠᠨ ᠵᠡᠭᠡᠯᠢ ᠭᠤᠳᠤᠮᠵᠢ	Сайхан зээл гудамж	150207002
Sarul Subdistrict	萨如拉街道	Sàrúlā Jiēdào	ᠰᠠᠷᠠᠭᠤᠯᠠ ᠵᠡᠭᠡᠯᠢ ᠭᠤᠳᠤᠮᠵᠢ	Саруул зээл гудамж	150207003
Bayanxili Subdistrict	白音席勒街道	Báiyīnxílè Jiēdào	ᠪᠠᠶᠠᠨᠰᠢᠯᠢ ᠵᠡᠭᠡᠯᠢ ᠭᠤᠳᠤᠮᠵᠢ	Баяншл зээл гудамж	150207004
Towns
Machi Town	麻池镇	Máchí Zhèn	ᠮᠠ ᡂᠢ ᠪᠠᠯᠭᠠᠰᠤ	Ма циг балгас	150207103
Horinger Town	哈林格尔镇	Hālíngé'ěr Zhèn	ᠬᠣᠷᠢᠨ ᠭᠡᠷ ᠪᠠᠯᠭᠠᠰᠤ	Хорин гэр балгас	150207105
Hoyor Hudag Town	哈业胡同镇	Hāyèhútòng Zhèn	ᠬᠣᠶᠠᠷ ᠬᠤᠳᠳᠤᠭ ᠪᠠᠯᠭᠠᠰᠤ	Хоёр худаг балгас	150207110
Sum
Agarut Sum	阿嘎如泰苏木	Āgārútài Sūmù	ᠠᠭᠠᠷᠤᠲᠠᠢ ᠰᠤᠮᠤ	Аартэй сум	150207202

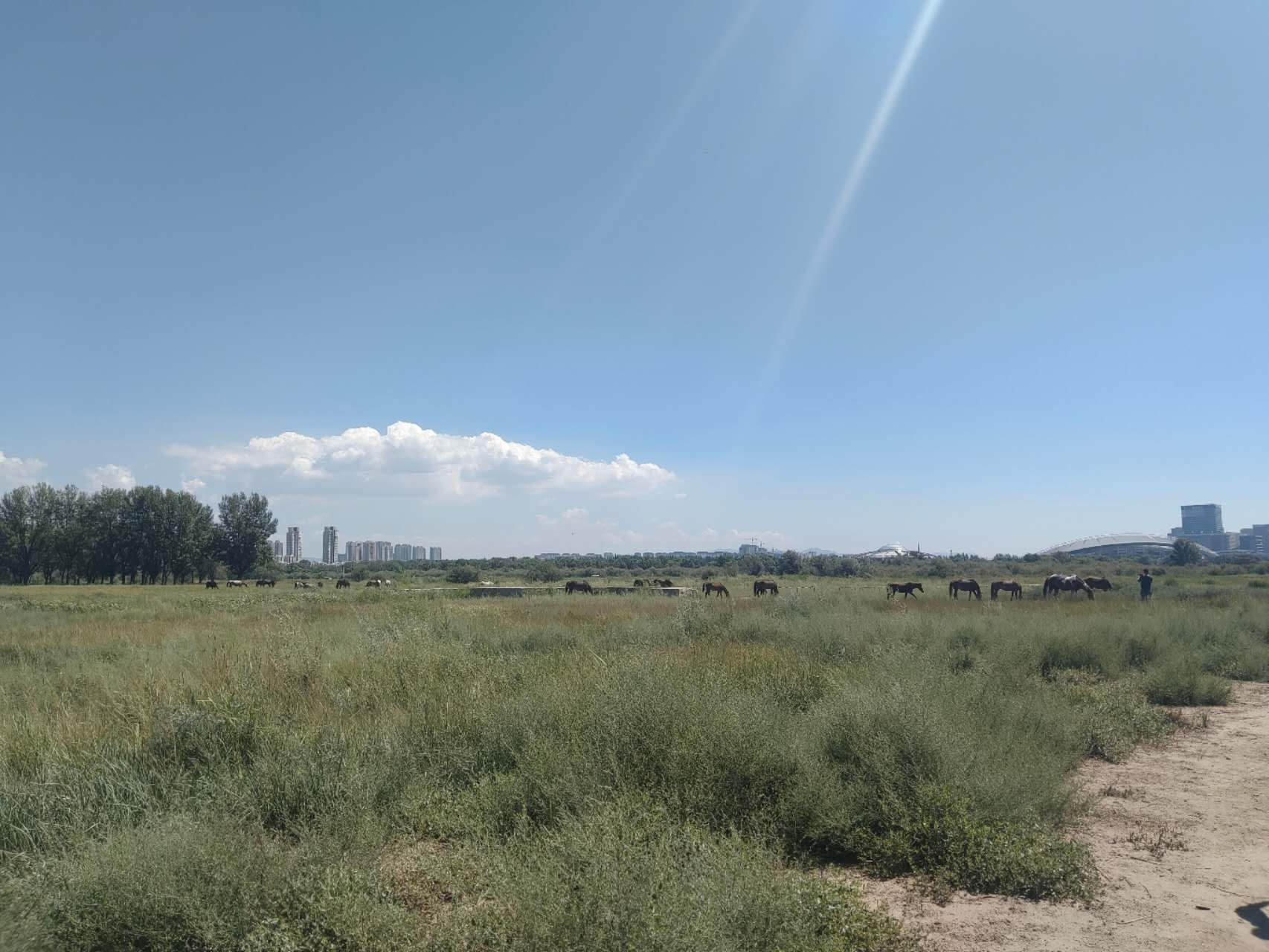
Scenery and horses in Jiuyuan District, Baotou City, Inner Mongolia
