= Baotou Metro =

Planned metro system in Baotou, China

Overview
- Owner: City of Baotou
- Locale: Baotou, Inner Mongolia, China
- Transit type: Rapid transit
- Number of lines: 6
- Number of stations: 125

Operation
- Operation will start: Suspended indefinitely (originally 2022)
- Operators: Baotou Metro Investment Group Co., Ltd

Technical
- System length: 182.5 km (113.40 mi)
- Track gauge: 1,435 mm (4 ft 8 1/2 in)

Baotou Metro

Chinese name
- Simplified Chinese: 包头地铁
- Traditional Chinese: 包頭地鐵
Transcriptions
Standard Mandarin
- Hanyu Pinyin: Bāotóu Dìtiě

Mongolian name
- Mongolian Cyrillic: Бугатын Метро
- Mongolian script: ᠪᠤᠭᠤᠲᠤ ᠵᠢᠨ ᠮᠸᠲ᠋ᠷᠤ᠋
Transcriptions
- SASM/GNC: Bugt-jin metoru

Baotou Metro was a proposed metro system to serve the city of Baotou, Inner Mongolia, China. Initial go ahead was granted by the NDRC in 2016 and construction started in May 2017, but the project was put on hold by the NDRC in November 2017 owing to concerns over cost.

== Line planning ==
The east-west Line 1 was to be 26.2 km (16.3 mi) long with 22 stations. Construction on the RMB 20.19 bn ($US 3 bn) project began in May 2017 with commissioning scheduled for 2022.

The first phase of the north-south Line 2 was 12.9 km (8.0 mi) long with 11 stations and a budget of RMB 10.36bn. Construction was due to begin in 2018 with the line to open in 2022.

Services on both lines were to be operated by a fleet of six-car type A metro trains operating at a maximum of 80 km/h (50 mph).

In the long term, a 182.5 km (113.40 mi) six-line network with 125 stations was envisaged. However, the entire plan is suspended as of November 2017.

== Phase 1 ==
Line	Terminals		Planned Opening	Length km	Stations
1	Baotou Steel	Donghe International Airport	2022	26.2	22
2	Xinxiancheng Railway Station	South Zhaotan	2022	12.9	11
Total				39.1	32
