= Manhan folk song =

Popular in Zhunger Banner (Ordos), Mongolia

Manhan folk songs (漫瀚调; “folk songs in desert areas” in Chinese). Melody and lyrics are its two principal features. Its melody primarily follows boginoduu (short-tune Mongolian song of Ordos). In lyrics, it largely relies on Mandarin Chinese, also employing Mongolian Well-known tunes include “Wang’ai Lama Temple”, “Planting a Willow”, “Chairman Mao brings us Happiness”. Manhan employs a pentatonic scale. The intervals of octave or even over octave are frequently used.

== History ==
The word Manhan originates from Mongolian, meaning touradon (sand beaches or desert), a landscape typical of Zhunger Banner (Ordos), which is also the birthplace of the Manhan Folk Song.

In 1996, Zhunger Banner was named the “Hometown of Manhan Folk Song of China” by the Ministry of Culture of the People's Republic of China. In 2008, Manhan folk song was listed as an Intangible Cultural Heritage. The Ordos were predominantly Mongols. The 19th century, while Jiaqing and Daoguang of Qing dynasty were emperors, witnessed the migration of Han Chinese into the Zhunger area where Mongolians gather, following an imperial edict that more people should inhabit that land. The population and economy (agriculture and animal husbandry) supplied material for folk arts and thus gave birth to Manhan Folk Song.

Under the Qing dynasty, various Chinese novels were translated into Mongolian Traditionally, Ordos territory was divided into seven banners. The Manhan Folk Song is peculiar to Zhunger Banner for two major reasons. Many songs are named after places and persons there, such as “Shuangshanliang Song”, “Heyanliang Song”, “Heidaigou Song”, “Jvhetan Song”, and “Deshengxi Song”. For example, “The Coquettish Woman”, “A Playboy to Recruit Soldiers” are famous songs of the second kind. Manhan Folk Song singing styles include solo, love duet and unison. The love duet is the most popular. Usually the woman raises a question and the man answers, or vice versa. Lyrics can be improvised and often tell a story about daily life. When a man and a woman sing in duet with co-tune cavity, the man often employs falsetto.

The songs are very popular in Zhunger Banner (Ordos). Dalate Banner (county) in Ordos and Tumote Banners (Huhhot and Baotou) of Inner Mongolia Autonomous Region in China.
