= Erketü Qatun =

- Mistress of Loyalty and Obedience; Holder of the seal of the Prince of Loyalty and Obedience
- Born: c. 1551
- Died: 24 June 1612 (aged 61)
- Noble family: Borjigin
- Spouses: Altan Khan; Sengge; Curüke; Busuytu
- Occupation: Regent of the Tümed

Erketü Qatun (Mongolian:ᠡᠷᠬᠡᠲᠦ
ᠬᠠᠳᠤᠨ; meaning Powerful Queen) (c. 1551–1612), also referred to as the Third Lady or Sanniangzi (Chinese: 三娘子), was an influential member of the Borjigin clan in the late 16th century and early 17th century. Her real name is unknown, only being remembered by a title bestowed upon her. She was the wife of four subsequent leaders of the Tümed, and her pro-Ming dynasty views kept the longest peace between the two competing powers.

== Biography ==
The actual name of Erketü Qatun is unknown; she became known by this title during a period of regency leading the Tümed. She was the granddaughter of Altan Khan through his daughter. Qatun was due to be married to an Ordos Mongol Prince, but instead Altan decided to marry her himself. Instead, the Khan offered the intended second wife of his grandson, Baya-aci. Infuriated, Baya-aci defected to the Ming dynasty, although he would be returned and in response the Khan was granted the title of Prince of Loyalty and Obedience by the Longqing Emperor.

Qatun had three children with Altan Khan, including Budasiri. After the death of the Khan in 1582, Qatun inherited the seal of the Prince of Loyalty and Obedience. This made her the go-between for the Tümed and the Ming Empire, earning her prestige in both courts. The Ming Empire referred to her as the "Third Lady" in reference to her position as the third wife of Altan Khan. She married for a second time, to Altan Khan's eldest son Sengge in 1582, allowing him to inherit the title. As part of the married, Qatun required Sengge to renounce all his earlier wives, and that she would be placed in command of troops and located in the Western Patrol far from where her new husband was based.

A rivalry formed after the death of Baya-aci a few months later. His widow, Baya-beyiji, married Sengge's son Curüke. This created tensions in the ruling family, with Qatun expecting an imminent attack. Around 1586 Sengge died, and Qatun hid the seal of the Prince of Loyalty and Obedience hoping to be able to pass it to her son. As Qatun held the seal, Curüke was forced to seek her approval to improve relations with the Ming Dynasty. He pressured by the Empire to seek a marital alliance with Qatun, who by then had 10,000 troops under her command.

Curüke and Qatun were married in 1586, and once again, she forced her new husband to renounce his former wives including Baya-beyiji. While he inherited the seal and title of the Prince of Loyalty and Obedience, the Ming Empire bestowed upon her independently the title of Mistress of Loyalty and Obedience. Curüke fell ill in 1606, and died a year later, with both titles once again in the hands of Qatun. She resisted marrying again for a time, but eventually married Busuytu, Curüke's grandson.

She did not pass the seal to her new husband, although did show him the various gifts she had accumulated from the Chinese over the years and had stored in a Buddhist temple. Busuytu asked the Ming Empire for a new title, but before receiving it, Qatun died on 24 July 1612. The Ming Emperor sent seven altars of offerings in respect of Qatun following her death. She had remained staunchly pro-Ming throughout her life, and this led to the longest period of peace between the Ming Empire and the Tümed.
