= Duguilang =

Societies

Duguilang (Mongolian: Дугуйлан, Duγuyilang) is a term for Mongolian secret societies from the late 19th and early 20th centuries. These duguilangs typically articulated popular discontent with higher authorities, especially with banner princes. The name is derived from the circular (Mongolian: Дугуй, circle) lists in which the members signed petitions to authorities. The circular lists were meant to conceal who the ringleaders were. Duguilangs did not always limit themselves to petitions and lawsuits, but in a number of cases resorted to more violent means; in one resolution against the sale of banner land (which was considered common property) to Chinese firms, the reasons for forming a duguilang are given as

Because all we people have no water to drink, no land to live on, but cannot bear this, we have formed the duguilang society and will not follow the princes' orders.

The first duguilangs sprung up in the Ordos region, but later also appeared in other areas. For example, Ard Ayush's band in what is now Khovd aimag, Mongolia, formed the "Tsetseg nuuryn duguilan" in 1912.

Modern Inner Mongolian historiography distinguishes three phases of Duguilangs: a first phase lasted from 1858 to 1891, a second phase from 1900 to 1908 was mainly concerned with excessive corvees and the sale of banner land, and a third phase from 1911 to 1929, which was in part influenced by revolutionary ideas.

Two important activists in duguilangs in the Ordos region in the 1910s and 1920s were Oljei jirγal, who became known as Šinelama ("new lama"), and Wangdannima. The uprising they initiated in 1926 would last until 1929.
