= Tumed Right Banner =

Tumed Right Banner 土默特右旗 • ᠲᠦᠮᠡᠳ ᠪᠠᠷᠠᠭᠤᠨ ᠬᠣᠰᠢᠭᠤ
- Banner
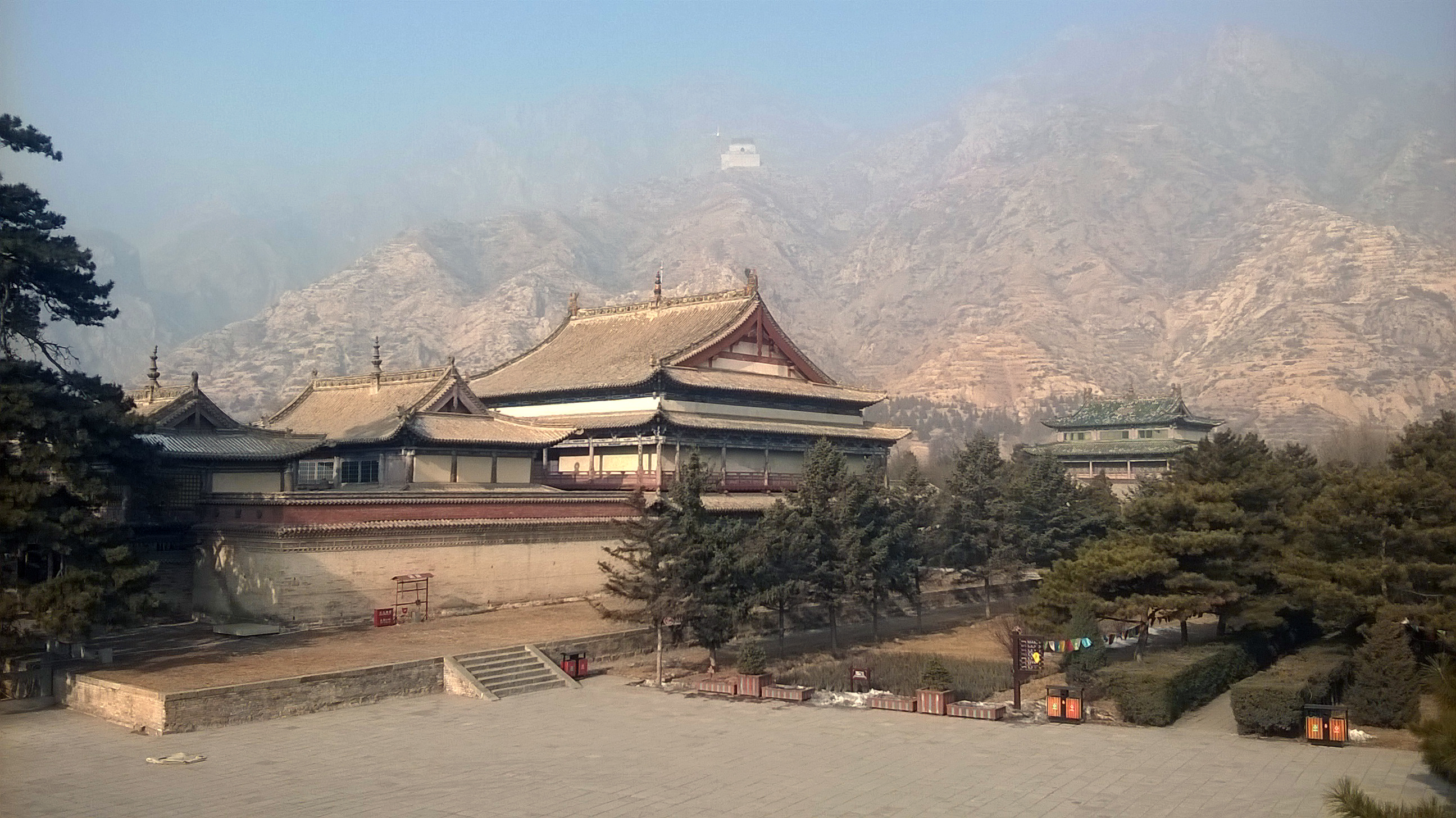

- Location in Inner Mongolia Tumed Right (China)
- Coordinates: 40°34′N 110°31′E
- Country: China
- Autonomous region: Inner Mongolia
- Prefecture-level city: Baotou
- Banner seat: Salqin

Area
  - Total: 2,323.64 km^{2} (897.16 sq mi)
- Elevation: 1,007 m (3,304 ft)

Population (2020)
  - Total: 237,421
  - Density: 102.176/km^{2} (264.635/sq mi)
- Time zone: UTC+8 (China Standard)
- Website: www.tmtyq.gov.cn

Tumed Right Banner

Chinese name
- Chinese: 土默特右旗
Transcriptions
Standard Mandarin
- Hanyu Pinyin: Tǔmòtè Yòuqí

Mongolian name
- Mongolian Cyrillic: Түмэд баруун хошуу
- Mongolian script: ᠲᠦᠮᠡᠳ ᠪᠠᠷᠠᠭᠤᠨ ᠬᠣᠰᠢᠭᠤ
Transcriptions
- SASM/GNC: Tumed Baruun Hôxûû pronounced [ˈtumə̆d ˈbɑrʊːn ˈxɔʃʊː]

Tumed Right Banner (Mongolian: ᠲᠦᠮᠡᠳ ᠪᠠᠷᠠᠭᠤᠨ ᠬᠣᠰᠢᠭᠤ, Chinese: 土默特右旗) is a banner of western Inner Mongolia, China. It is under the administration of Baotou City, 59 kilometres (37 mi) to the west, and is located along on the Jingzang Expressway, running from Beijing to Tibet.

== Administrative divisions ==
Tumed Right Banner is made up of 5 towns and 3 townships.

Name	Simplified Chinese	Hanyu Pinyin	Mongolian (Hudum Script)	Mongolian (Cyrillic)	Administrative division code
Towns
Salqin Town	萨拉齐镇	Sàlāqí Zhèn	ᠰᠠᠭᠠᠯᠢᠴᠢᠨ ᠪᠠᠯᠭᠠᠰᠤ	Саальчин балгас	150221104
Shuanglong Town	双龙镇	Shuānglóng Zhèn	ᠱᠤᠸᠠᠩ ᠯᠦᠩ ᠪᠠᠯᠭᠠᠰᠤ	Сойн лүн балгас	150221105
Maidar Ju Town	美岱召镇	Měidàizhào Zhèn	ᠮᠠᠢᠳᠠᠷᠢ ᠵᠤᠤ ᠪᠠᠯᠭᠠᠰᠤ	Майдари жуу балгас	150221106
Goumen Town	沟门镇	Gōumén Zhèn	ᠭᠧᠦ ᠮᠧᠨ ᠪᠠᠯᠭᠠᠰᠤ	Гүү мен балгас	150221107
Jiangjunyao Town	将军尧镇	Jiāngjūnyáo Zhèn	ᠵᠠᠩᠵᠦᠨ ᠶᠣᠤ ᠪᠠᠯᠭᠠᠰᠤ	Жанжин ёо балгас	150221108
Townships
Haizi Township (Nagurt Township)	海子乡	Hǎizi Xiāng	ᠨᠠᠭᠤᠷᠲᠤ ᠰᠢᠶᠠᠩ	Нуурт шиян	150221213
Manggisan Nur Township	明沙淖乡	Míngshānào Xiāng	ᠮᠠᠩᠭᠢᠰᠤᠨ ᠨᠠᠭᠤᠷ ᠰᠢᠶᠠᠩ	Мангисан нуур шиян	150221214
Subrag Township	苏波盖乡	Sūbōgài Xiāng	ᠰᠤᠪᠤᠷᠭ᠎ᠠ ᠰᠢᠶᠠᠩ	Суварга шиян	150221215

Other:

- Jiufengshan Ecological Management Committee (九峰山生态管理委员会, ᠵᠢᠦ ᠹᠧᠩ ᠱᠠᠨ ᠠᠭᠤᠯᠠᠨ ᠤ ᠠᠮᠢ ᠠᠬᠤᠢ ᠶᠢᠨ ᠬᠠᠮᠢᠶᠠᠷᠤᠯᠲᠠ ᠶᠢᠨ ᠵᠥᠪᠯᠡᠯ)

== Climate ==
Climate data for Tumed Right Banner, elevation 999 m (3,278 ft), (1991–2020 normals, extremes 1981–2010)
Month	Jan	Feb	Mar	Apr	May	Jun	Jul	Aug	Sep	Oct	Nov	Dec	Year
Record high °C (°F)	7.3 (45.1)	16.0 (60.8)	23.5 (74.3)	35.2 (95.4)	35.9 (96.6)	39.8 (103.6)	39.7 (103.5)	35.0 (95.0)	33.4 (92.1)	27.8 (82.0)	20.1 (68.2)	11.2 (52.2)	39.8 (103.6)
Mean daily maximum °C (°F)	−3.4 (25.9)	2.2 (36.0)	9.7 (49.5)	18.4 (65.1)	24.6 (76.3)	28.8 (83.8)	29.8 (85.6)	27.8 (82.0)	23.1 (73.6)	15.9 (60.6)	6.1 (43.0)	−1.7 (28.9)	15.1 (59.2)
Daily mean °C (°F)	−9.9 (14.2)	−4.7 (23.5)	2.9 (37.2)	11.2 (52.2)	17.8 (64.0)	22.3 (72.1)	23.8 (74.8)	21.8 (71.2)	16.3 (61.3)	8.9 (48.0)	0.0 (32.0)	−7.6 (18.3)	8.6 (47.4)
Mean daily minimum °C (°F)	−15.5 (4.1)	−10.5 (13.1)	−3.0 (26.6)	4.2 (39.6)	10.6 (51.1)	15.6 (60.1)	18.1 (64.6)	16.3 (61.3)	10.5 (50.9)	3.2 (37.8)	−4.7 (23.5)	−12.4 (9.7)	2.7 (36.9)
Record low °C (°F)	−30.8 (−23.4)	−28.3 (−18.9)	−18.3 (−0.9)	−8.4 (16.9)	−2.5 (27.5)	2.2 (36.0)	10.4 (50.7)	6.8 (44.2)	−1.9 (28.6)	−8.5 (16.7)	−22.3 (−8.1)	−30.9 (−23.6)	−30.9 (−23.6)
Average precipitation mm (inches)	1.6 (0.06)	4.1 (0.16)	9.9 (0.39)	13.2 (0.52)	29.2 (1.15)	41.1 (1.62)	95.7 (3.77)	88.4 (3.48)	59.1 (2.33)	18.7 (0.74)	8.8 (0.35)	2.7 (0.11)	372.5 (14.68)
Average precipitation days (≥ 0.1 mm)	1.6	2.0	3.1	3.6	5.8	8.2	11.0	11.1	8.6	4.3	2.3	1.7	63.3
Average snowy days	2.6	3.0	2.6	0.7	0	0	0	0	0	0.2	2.0	2.9	14
Average relative humidity (%)	57	49	42	36	37	47	60	64	61	55	57	56	52
Mean monthly sunshine hours	196.3	210.7	250.6	281.8	316.5	302.8	293.8	283.9	243.5	242.3	199.2	182.6	3,004
Percentage possible sunshine	65	69	67	70	71	67	65	67	66	71	68	64	68
Source: China Meteorological Administration

== See also ==
- Manhan folk song
