= Badekar Monastery =

Tibetan Buddhist monastery in Baotou, Inner Mongolia, China

- Tibetan transcription(s); Tibetan: རྒྱ༌ཆེན་རྟོགས་ལྡན༌གླིང༌། Wylie transliteration: rgya chen rtogs ldan gling Official transcription (China): Gyaqên Dog Dänling; Chinese transcription(s); Traditional: 廣覺寺; Simplified: 广觉寺; Pinyin: Guang Jue Si
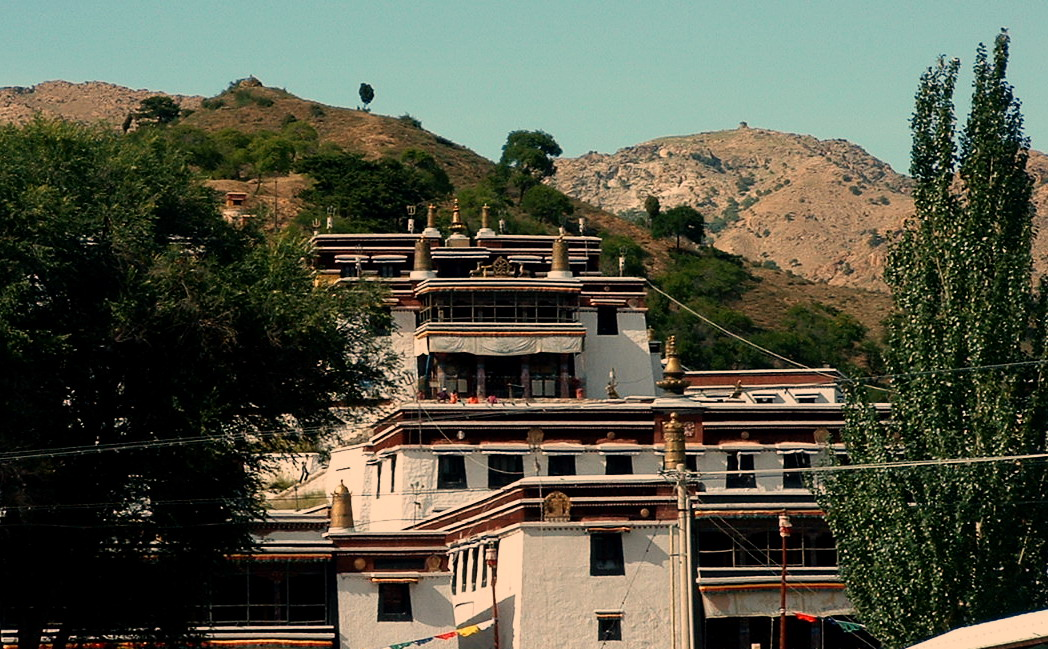
- Badekar Monastery

- Location within China

Religion
- Affiliation: Tibetan Buddhism
- Sect: Gelug

Location
- Location: Bugt Hot
- Country: China
- Coordinates: 40.792319°N 110.314595°E

Architecture
- Style: Tibetan
- Founder: Prince of Ordos Fore-Banner of the Left Wing
- Established: Qing dynasty Renovated 1749

Badakar Monastery (Mongolian script: ᠪᠠᠳᠺᠡᠷ ᠰᠦᠮ᠎ᠡ Badakar Süm), alternatively known as Udin Ju (Chinese: 五当召, transcription Wudang Zhao), is a Tibetan Buddhist monastery of the Gelug sect. It is the largest Tibetan Buddhist monastery in Inner Mongolia, and was designated a Major Historical and Cultural Site Protected at the National Level in 1996.

== Names ==
Badekar Monastery has three names. One is local Mongolian, which is Wudang Temple (Chinese: 五當召; pinyin: Wǔ dāng zhào); Wudang is a Chinese transliteration of the Mongolian word for willow, whilst zhao is a transliteration of the word for temple. Badakar is the formal Mongolian name from oral Tibetan Bämagar/Pemakar (white lotus). The formal quadrilingual name, granted in 1756 by the Qianlong emperor, but rarely used, is

- Tibetan name: རྒྱ༌ཆེན་རྟོགས་ལྡན༌གླིང༌། (Gyaqên Dog Dänling, Gyaqêndog Monastery)
- Mongolian name: ᠠᠭ᠋ᠤᢈ ᠶᠡᠬᠡ
  ᠣᠨᠤᠯᢌᠤ
  ᠰᠦᠮ᠎ᠡ (Agu'ih Onolt Monastery)
- Chinese: 廣覺寺; pinyin: Guǎng Jué Sì (Guangjue Monastery)
- Manchu name: Amba Ulhisu Juktehen

== Legend ==
According to the legend, in the early Qing Dynasty, a local herdsman named Agwang Qurimo（阿旺曲日莫）went out to study Buddhism. After completing his studies and returning to his hometown, he hoped to build a monastery in his native land, but he was not satisfied with all the sites he had searched. One day, an eagle snatched his hat and dropped it at the current location of Badekar Monastery. There he encountered a nomad woman whose milk pail was kicked over by a cow, and the spilled milk instantly turned into clusters of white lotus flowers. This scene was regarded as an auspicious sign from the Buddhist realm, so the site was finally determined for the construction of the monastery. Its Tibetan name, "White Lotus Temple", was thus derived.

== History ==
The Qing government was a major patron of Tibetan Buddhism in Hohhot and Inner Mongolia more broadly. The association between the government and religion assisted the Qing in maintaining their power in Inner Mongolia. Badekar Monastery was built sometime after the Kangxi era as part of the rapid construction of Tibetan Buddhist structures. The monastery was expanded on a massive scale under the Qianlong emperor, reportedly to pacify the local Mongolian population after the Qing massacred a rebellious group from the Dzungar Basin. The complex also received generous grants and expansion under the Jiaqing emperor and Daoguang emperor.

The monastery is located 54 km from Bugat, but was developed as a major tourist destination during the reform and opening up in the 1980s. In 2001, the area around the monastery was declared a national park.

== Architecture ==
In contrast to other Tibetan Buddhist institutions in Inner Mongolia, Badekar Monastery was constructed according to the layout of Tashi Lhunpo Monastery in Xigazê, thus it incorporates no Han-style architecture. All structures are positioned horizontally along the mountain, with halls along the central access ascending up into the mountains.

== Environment ==
From the late 1990s, it was observed that much of the vegetation near the monastery was receding, streams were drying up, and desert was spreading. The problem has been exacerbated by heavy summer rains, which inundate the dry soil, washing it away. The area in front of the monastery has been urbanised and, in 2009, it was noted that very few willow trees could be found in its vicinity, despite them once having been plentiful.
