= Baotou =

City in Inner Mongolia, China

Baotou 包头市 • ᠪᠤᠭᠤᠲᠤᠬᠣᠲᠠ Paotow; Bugat
- Prefecture-level city
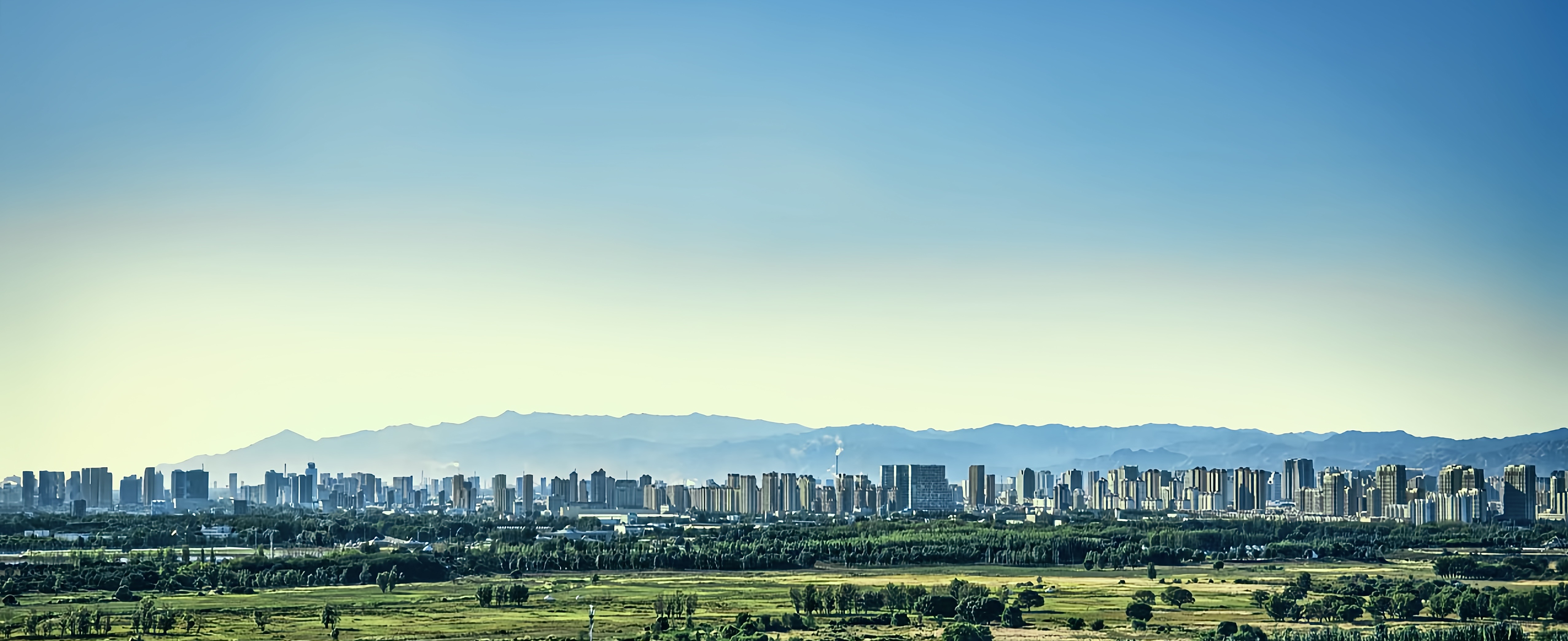
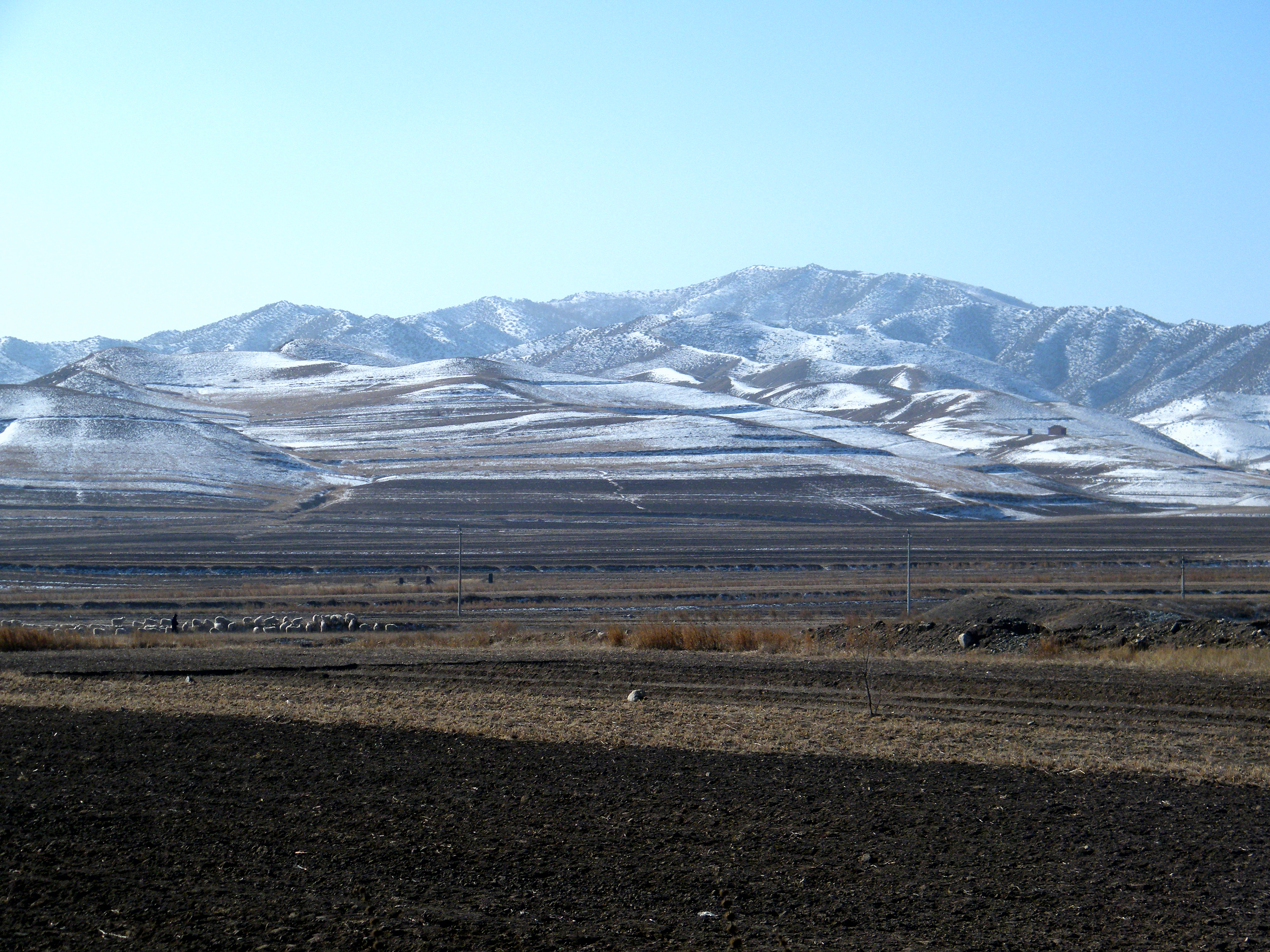
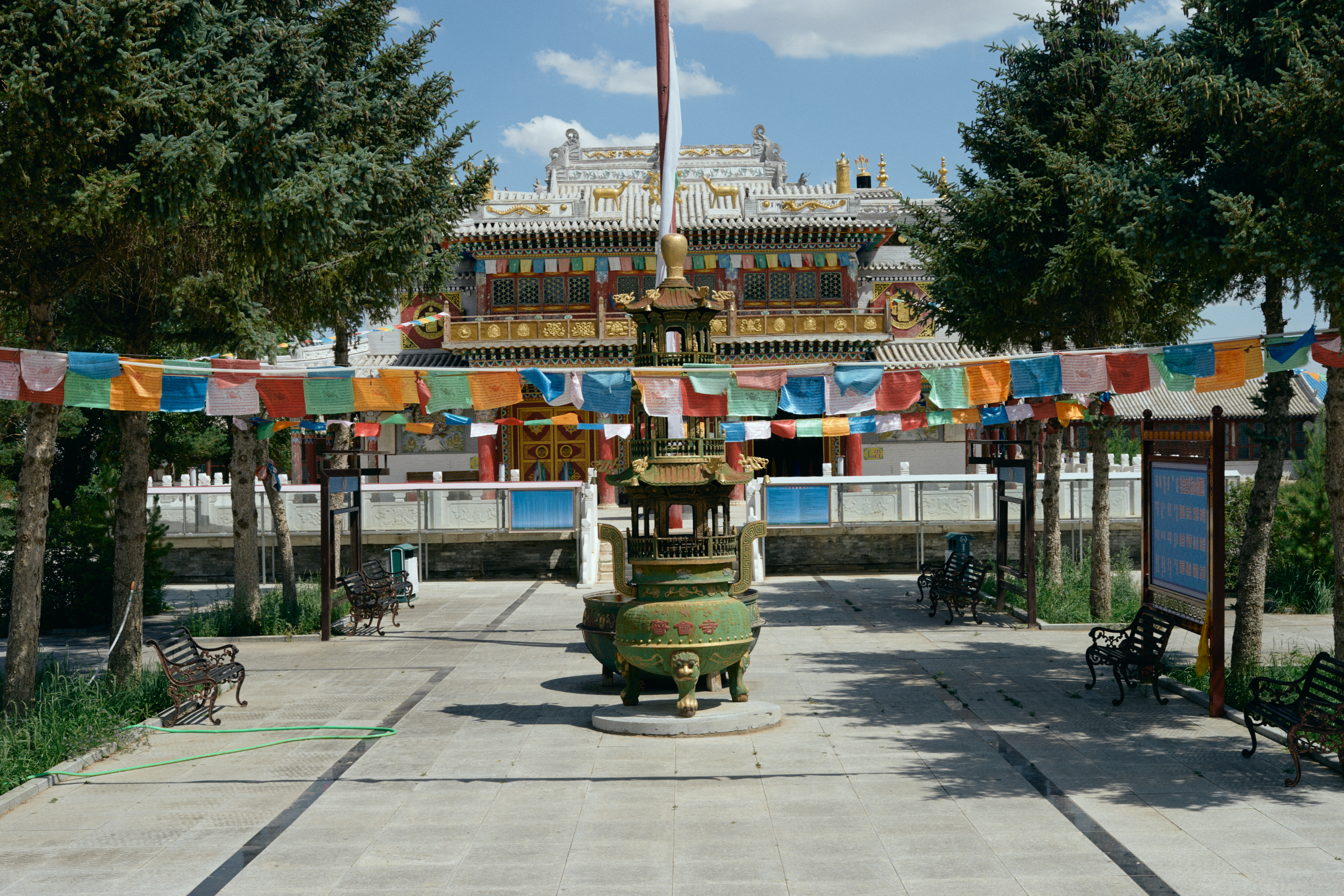
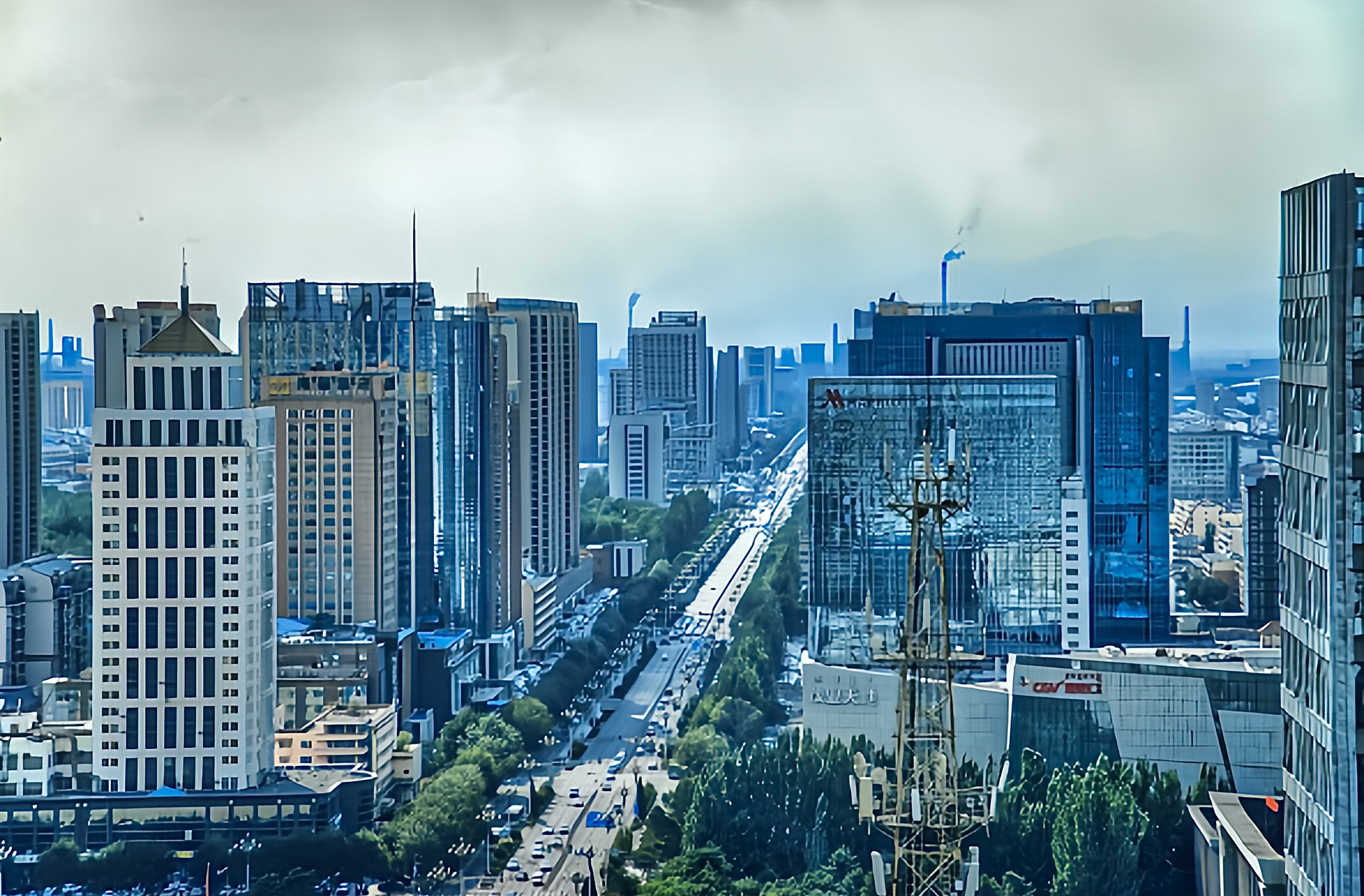
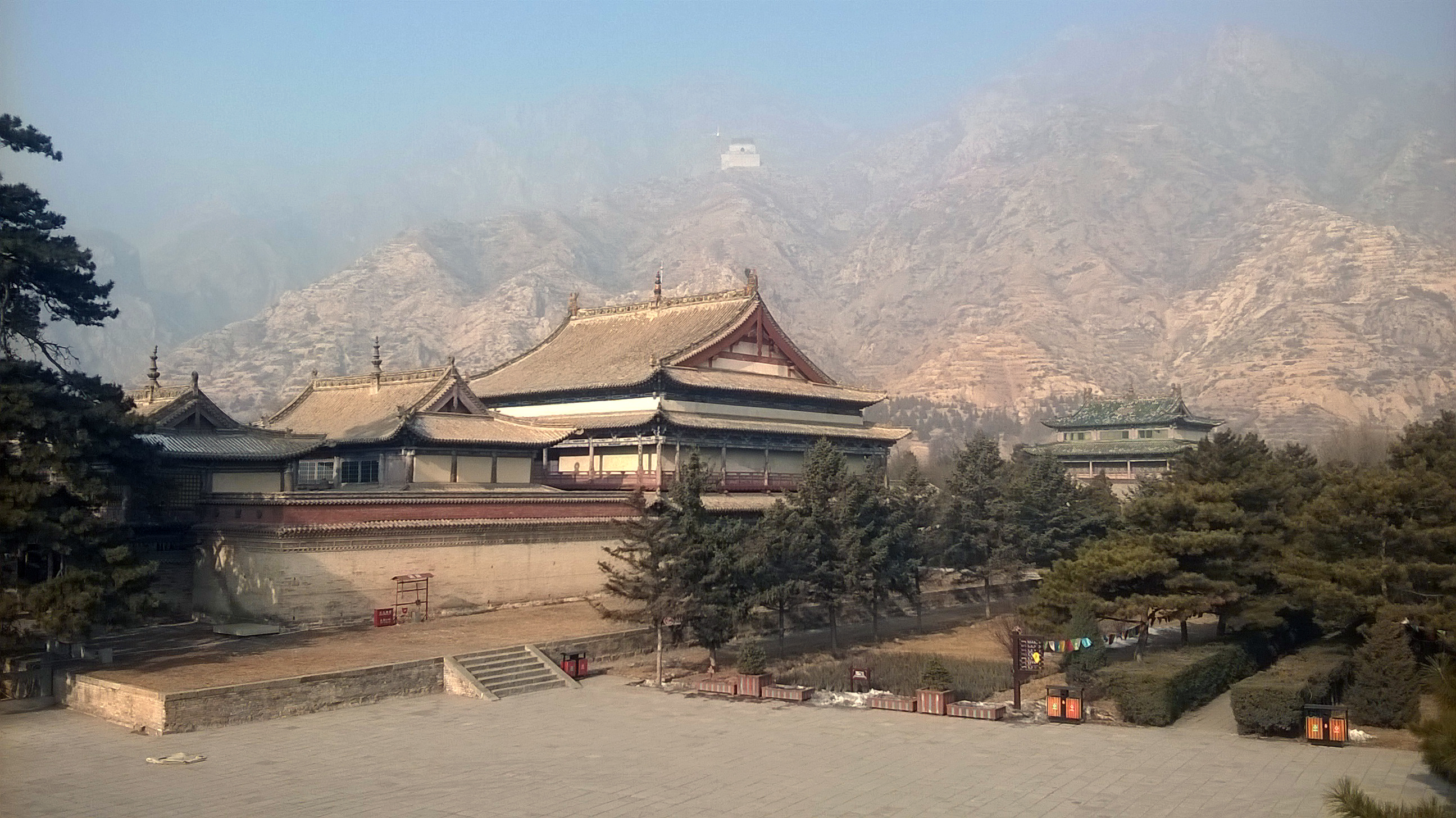
- Baotou skyline behind Saihantalah Grasslands Park and in front of the Yin Mountains Yin Mountains of rural Baotou Xilamuren Temple Baotou metro area Meidaizhao Monastery
- Nickname: Lucheng (鹿城)
- Location of Baotou City jurisdiction in Inner Mongolia

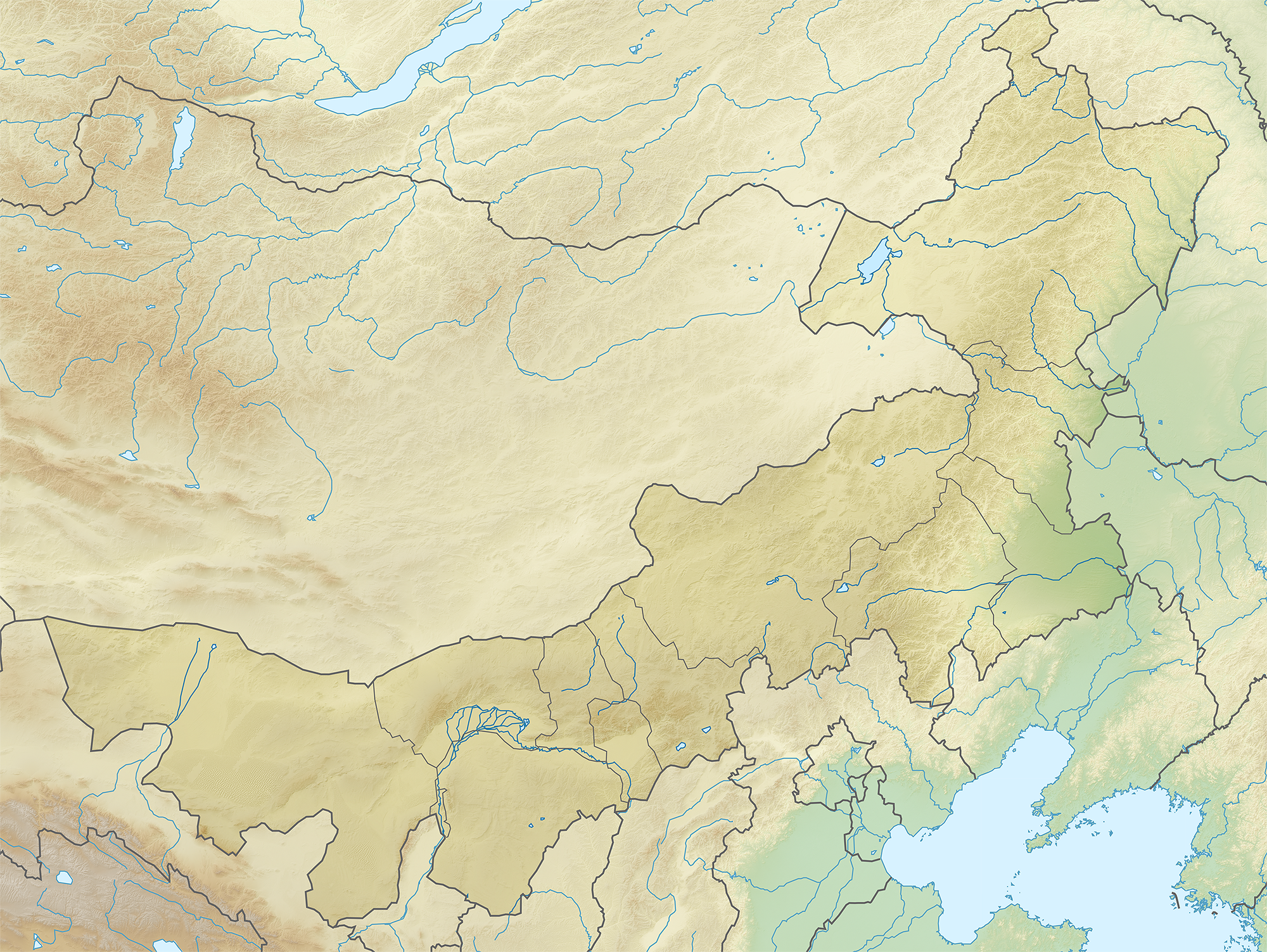
- Location of the city centre in Inner Mongolia Baotou (China)
- Coordinates (Baotou municipal government): 40°37′17″N 109°57′12″E
- Country: China
- Autonomous region: Inner Mongolia
- County-level divisions: 10 banners
- Municipal seat: Jiuyuan District

Area
  - Prefecture-level city: 27,768 km^{2} (10,721 sq mi)
  - Urban: 247.14 km^{2} (95.42 sq mi)
  - Metro: 953.5 km^{2} (368.1 sq mi)
- Elevation: 1,065 m (3,494 ft)

Population (2023 census)
  - Prefecture-level city: 2,761,700
  - Density: 99.456/km^{2} (257.59/sq mi)
  - Urban: 2,283,700
  - Urban density: 9,240.5/km^{2} (23,933/sq mi)
  - Metro: 2,418,200
  - Metro density: 2,536/km^{2} (6,569/sq mi)
  - Major ethnic groups: Han - 94%

GDP
  - Prefecture-level city: CN¥ 477.1 billion US$ 65.9 billion PPP$ 117.8 billion
  - Per capita: CN¥ 170,105; US$ 23,824; PPP$ 42,530
- Time zone: UTC+08:00 (China Standard)
- Postal code: 014000
- Area code: 472
- ISO 3166 code: CN-NM-02
- License plate prefixes: 蒙B
- Local dialect: Jin (Baotou dialect); Northeastern Mandarin; Southern Mongolian
- Website: www.baotou.gov.cn

Baotou

Chinese name
- Simplified Chinese: 包头
- Traditional Chinese: 包頭
- Postal: Paotow
Transcriptions
Standard Mandarin
- Hanyu Pinyin: Bāotóu
- Bopomofo: ㄅㄠ ㄊㄡˊ
- Gwoyeu Romatzyh: Bautour
- Wade–Giles: Pao^{1}-tʻou^{2}
- Yale Romanization: Bāutóu
- IPA: [páʊ.tʰǒʊ]

Mongolian name
- Mongolian Cyrillic: Бугaт хот
- Mongolian script: ᠪᠤᠭᠤᠲᠤ ᠬᠣᠲᠠ

Baotou (Note: Chinese: 包头市; pinyin: Bāotóu; Mongolian: ᠪᠤᠭᠤᠲᠤ ᠬᠣᠲᠠ; Бугат хот; Buɣutu qota; Bugat) is the second-largest city by urban population in Inner Mongolia, China. Governed as a prefecture-level city, its built-up (or metro) area within its five urban districts is home to 2,261,089 people while the total population is 2,709,378 as of the 2020 census.

Baotou's southern border is delineated by the Yellow River. The city's namesake, literally translating to "place with deer", is Mongolian, bringing about the nickname of "Lucheng" (Chinese: 鹿城; pinyin: Lùchéng), meaning "City of Deer". Alternatively, Baotou is known as the "City of Steel in the Grasslands" (草原钢城; Cǎoyuán Gāngchéng), since steel was a major industry in the city which is built on the Mongolian grassland and contains a large grassland park. Today, Baotou mines and refines over half of the rare-earth minerals produced in the world. This has led to environmental contamination near the industrial sites.

== History ==
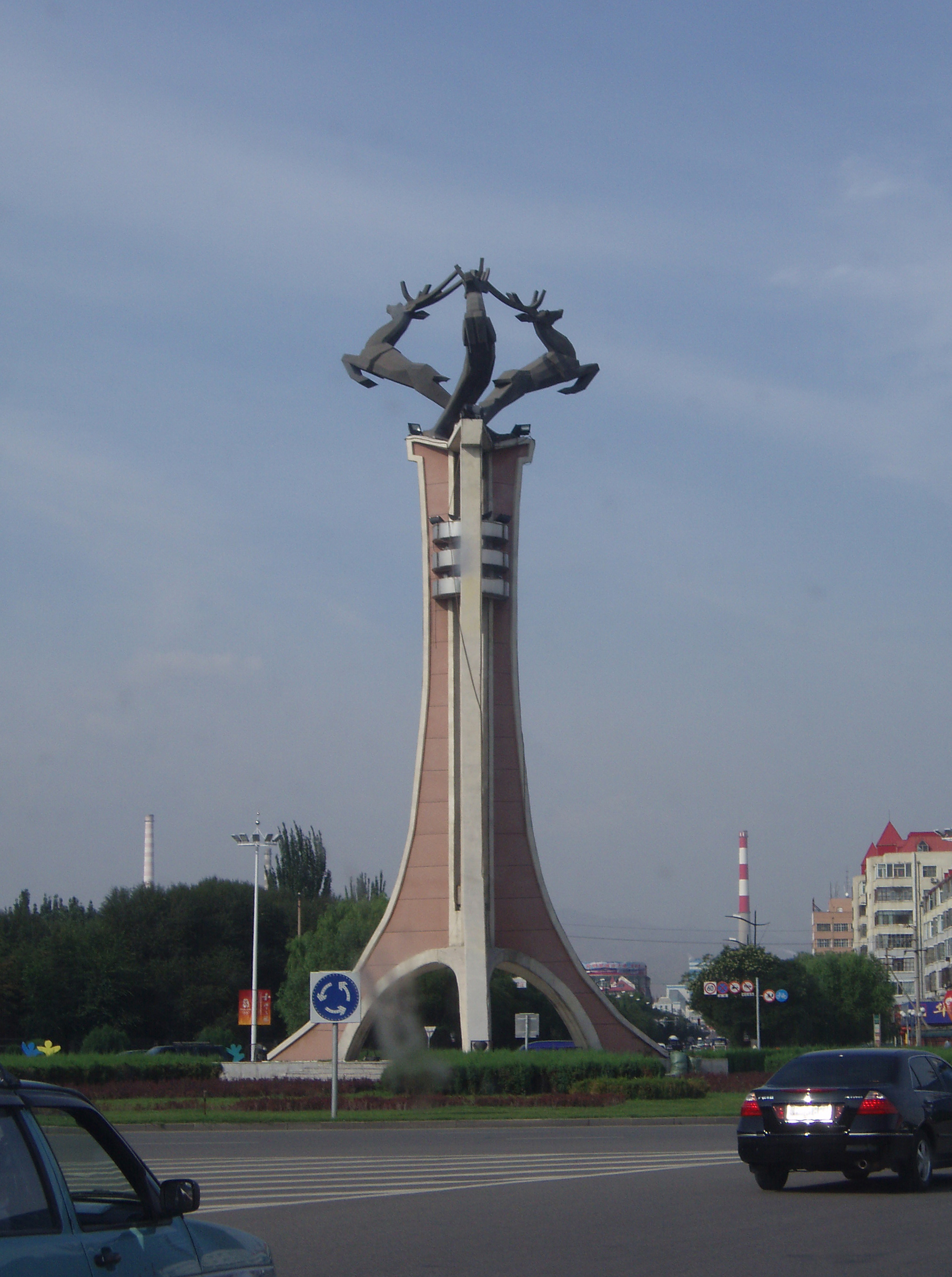
The Deer monument in urban Baotou

=== Ancient times ===
The area now known as Baotou was inhabited by nomads, some of whose descendants would later be categorized as Mongols. Near the end of the Han dynasty (206 BC–220 AD), Lü Bu, a particularly noteworthy warrior, was born in today's Jiuyuan District of Baotou.

=== Foundation of the town ===
Compared to the capital of Inner Mongolia, Hohhot, Baotou's construction as a city came relatively late, being incorporated as a town in 1809. The city's site was chosen because it was in an arable region of the Yellow River's Great Bend.

=== Early 20th century ===
The Gelaohui secret society and the Hui Muslim General Ma Fuxiang came to an agreement in 1922, in which Ma Fuxiang agreed to allow the Gelaohui to extort protection money from wool merchants in Baotou.

A railway from Beijing was constructed in 1923, and the city began spurring some industrial sites. A German-Chinese joint-venture in 1934 constructed the Baotou Airport and opened a weekly route connecting Baotou with Ningxia and Lanzhou.

When young Owen Lattimore visited Baotou in 1925, it was still "a little husk of a town in a great hollow shell of mud ramparts, where two busy streets made a traders' quarter", but already an important railhead. Qinghai and Gansu wool and hides were brought down the Yellow River by raft and boat from Lanzhou to Baotou, and shipped from Baotou by rail to the east (in particular, to Tianjin for export). The river traffic was one-way only, however, as the fast current made sailing up the Yellow River impractical. To travel from Baotou back to Lanzhou or Yinchuan, one would use a cart and camel road. There were also caravan roads from Baotou to Ordos and the Alxa League.

=== Mid-20th century ===
==== Second Sino-Japanese War ====
Baotou was under Japanese control from 1937 until 1945.

==== Chinese civil war ====
On September 19, 1949, after the September 19 Rebellion, Baotou fell under Communist control. The People's Government was formed in February 1950.

==== Socialist Industrial City (1950s–1960s) ====
The early decades of the People's Republic of China marked Baotou's transformation into a flagship socialist industrial center. In 1954, it was designated one of the nation's eight key cities for heavy industry development, alongside Chengdu, Datong, Lanzhou, Luoyang, Taiyuan, Wuhan and Xi'an. This status, awarded based on the presence of major industrial enterprises, guaranteed Baotou prioritized state funding and support for construction. The Iron and Steel Base in Baotou is one of the "156 projects", which were constructed with the help of the Soviet Union to develop China's national economy in the 1950s and 1960s, and it continues this reputation until this day. The city's urban layout itself reflected this new era, as Soviet architects contributed their experience in designing "socialist cities" – planned communities centered around major industrial plants. This period saw Baotou rapidly expand and develop according to this integrated model of industry and urban living. Until the middle of the 1960s, the steel complex at Baotou was one of the rare examples of industrialization in the periphery of China.

=== Late 20th century ===
==== Modernization and diversification ====
Following the economic reforms, Baotou entered a new phase of growth and transformation. While the Baotou Iron and Steel Company remained the cornerstone of the local economy, the city began to diversify its industrial base. It evolved from a purely steel-producing center into a comprehensive hub for rare earth metallurgy, machinery manufacturing, and energy production, leveraging its rich mineral resources.

==== 1996 earthquake ====
On 3 May 1996, at 03:32AM UTC (11:32AM local time), an earthquake of M_{S} 6.4 occurred. Since the epicenter of the earthquake was located close to the city, Baotou was very damaged by the earthquake: 26 people were killed, 453 injured and 196,633 lost their homes. The electrical infrastructure of the city was also damaged, and soil liquefaction occurred around the swamps of the Yellow River.

The earthquake, which destroyed many old houses, led to the reconstruction of Baotou. In 2002, the Baotou Municipal Government was awarded by UN-HABITAT for the improvements in shelter and the urban environments.

=== 21st century ===
In the early 21st century, Baotou's economy grew rapidly, growing about tenfold from 2000 to 2010. The city's gross domestic product peaked at about 386.763 billion renminbi (RMB) in 2016, and has shrunk significantly since then.

== Economy ==
Baotou is the largest economy of the Inner Mongolia Autonomous Region, and accounted for approximately 21.3% of Inner Mongolia's total gross domestic product (GDP) as of 2012. As of 2018, the city's GDP is 295.180 billion renminbi (RMB), a 7.22% increase from the previous year, but much lower than the city's peak of 386.763 billion RMB in 2016.

Baotou's secondary sector has proven crucial to the city's economy. As of 2016, it contributed 182.215 RMB to the city's economy, 47.11% of the city's total GDP. However, like the city's total economy, it has shrunk since then. As of 2020, the city's secondary sector contributed 115.300 billion RMB to Baotou's economy.

Baotou Xingsheng Economic & Technological Development Zone is an industrial zone in Baotou.

As noted, in the early Communist years, Baotou served as an industrial centre, with a significant portion of its economy coming from its industry around metals, mostly steel. The Iron and Steel Base of Bautou was constructed with the help of the Soviet Union to help China in developing its economy; it was one of the 156 Projects that the Soviets helped build for that purpose in the 1950s and 1960s.

Baotou is a major center for rare-earth metals. Rare-earth minerals from the Bayan Obo Mining District, about 120 kilometres from Baotou, are processed in the city. They are used in many electrical and electronic devices, such as smartphones, TVs, wind turbines, and electric vehicle motors. The toxic byproducts from the refineries are contained by the Baotou Tailings Dam.

== Demographics ==
According to the 2020 Chinese Census, Baotou has a permanent population of about 2,709,400 people, up about 59,000 from the 2010 Census. The average household in Baotou comprises 2.27 people, down from 2.65 as of 2010.

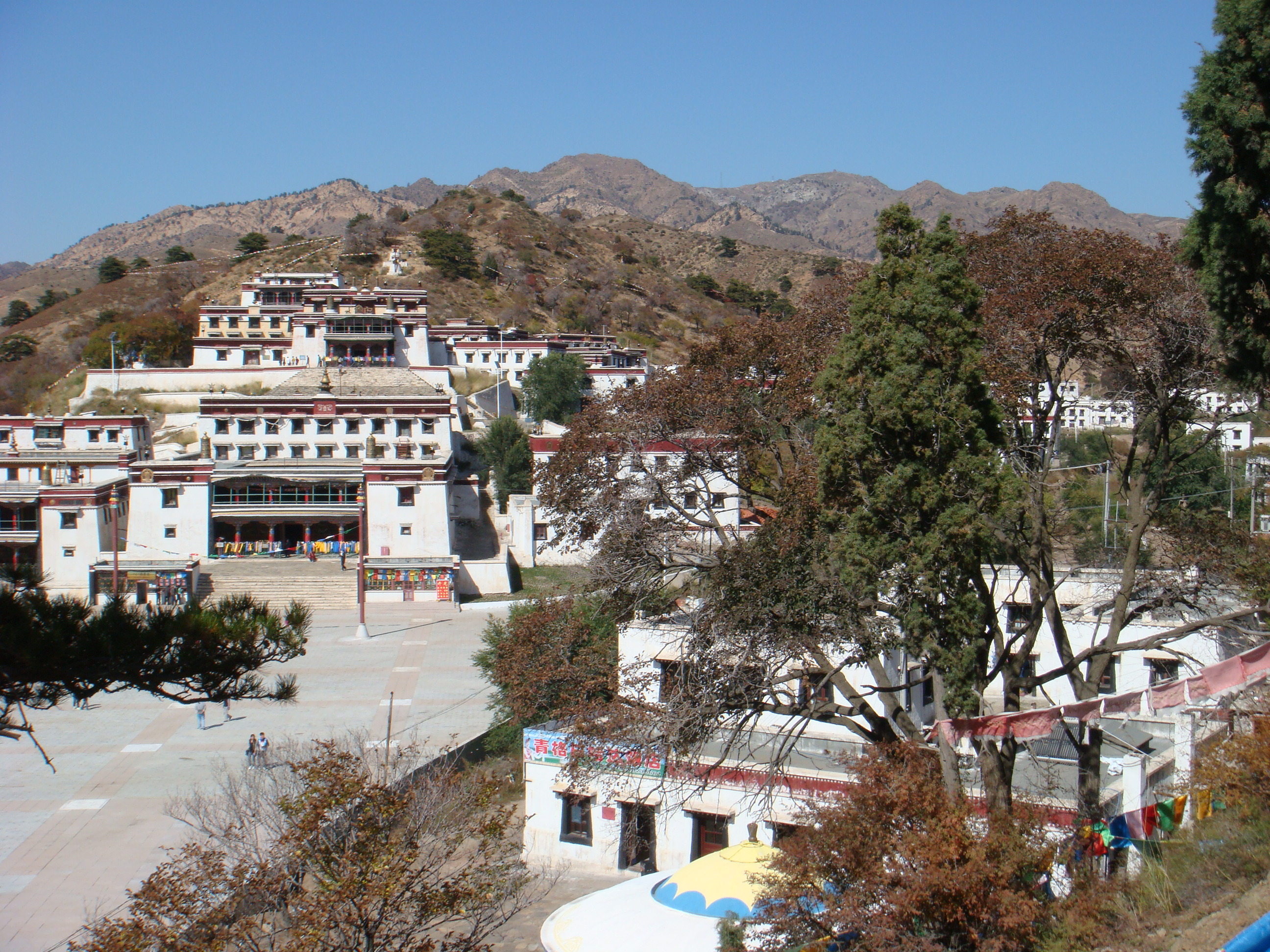
Badekar Monastery

=== Age and sex distribution ===
Baotou, like many places in China, has an aging population. As per the 2020 Census, 20.19% of Baotou's population is aged 60 and older, 1.49 percentage points above the Chinese national average of 18.70%. 13.70% of Baotou's population is aged 65 and older, 0.20 percentage points above the Chinese national average of 13.50%. The number of people aged 60 and older has grown by 7.42% since 2010, and the number of people aged 65 and older has grown by 4.88% during that same span.

Per the census, 50.7% of the city's population is male, and 49.3% is female.

=== Ethnic groups ===
Ethnicity	2000		2020	
Ethnicity	Population	Percentage	Population	Percentage
Han Chinese	2,122,737	94.16%	2,525,500	93.21%
Mongol	67,209	2.98%	113,200	4.18%
Hui people	36,234	1.61%	N/A	N/A
Manchu	22,826	1.01%	N/A	N/A
Korean Chinese	848	0.04%	N/A	N/A
Other	N/A	N/A	70,700	2.61%
Total	N/A	100.00%	2,709,400	100.00%

=== Floating population ===
As of 2020, there are approximately 1,026,400 floating residents of Baotou, that is, residents of the city with a hukou registration elsewhere. This population has increased by 144,100, or 22.37%, since 2010.

=== Urbanization ===
As of the 2020 Census, 2,334,400 people, or 86.16% of the city's population, lives in urban areas. The remaining 375,000 people, 13.84% of the city's population, lives in rural areas.

== Prominent locations ==
- The 39,000 capacity Baotou Olympic Sports Centre Stadium(包头奥林匹克体育中心) is the main sports venue in the city and is used mostly for football matches.

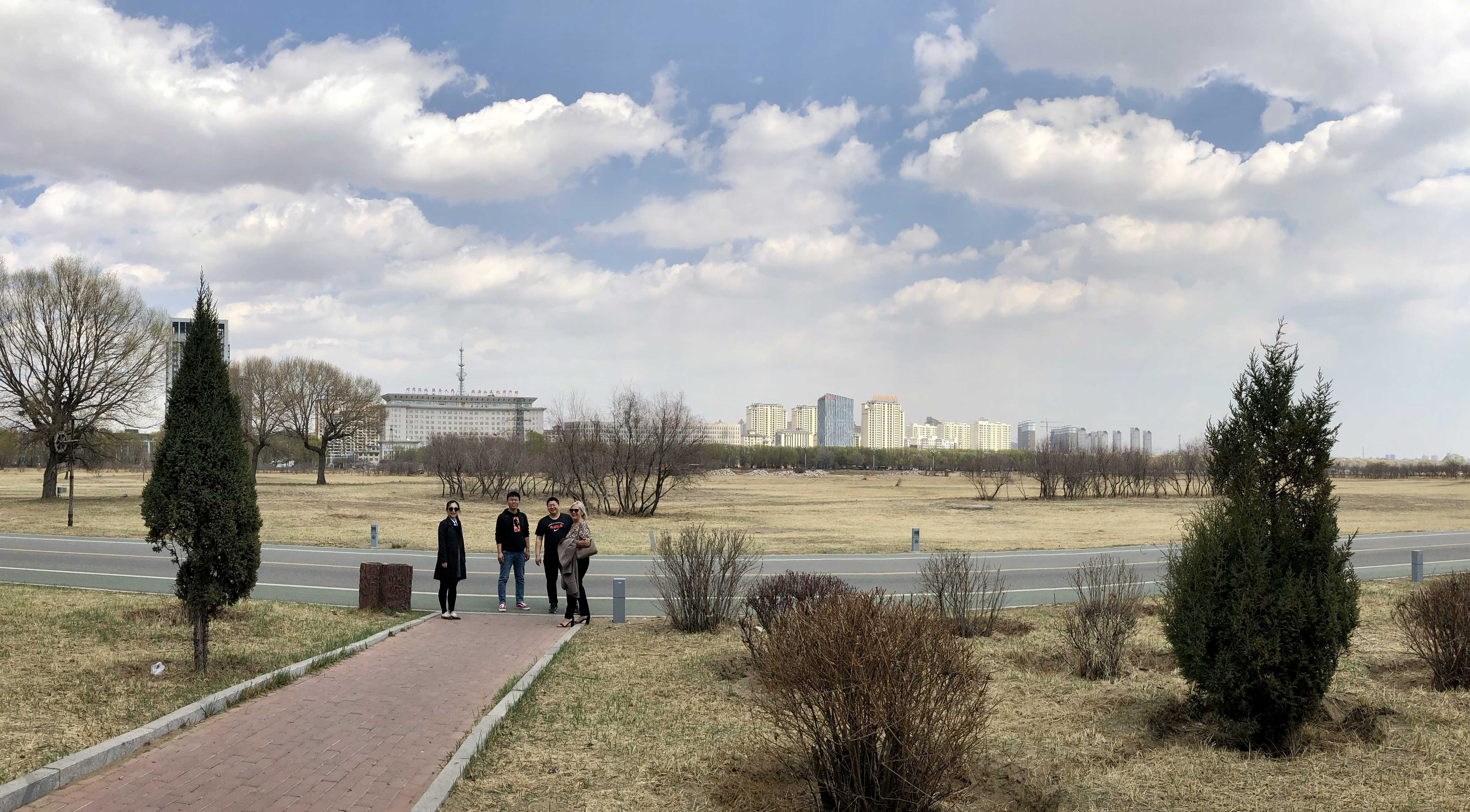
Saihantalah Grasslands Park, central Baotou

- Saihantalah Grasslands Park (赛汗塔拉城中草原) or Ecological Reserve is a large urban park in Qingshan district. The 5.5 km square park is home to thirty wild animal and bird species and is reputedly one of the largest urban parks in China. It is a popular recreational location and attracts 2 million visitors a year.
- The largest Tibetan Buddhist monastery in Inner Mongolia, Badekar Monastery is located in Shiguai District.
- The Baotou Tailings Dam or Weikuang Dam is a tailings dam about 20 kilometres outside the main city of Baotou. It is owned by Baotou Steel and contains the toxic waste from rare-earth mineral refineries. Since as early as 2012, there have been reports of serious contamination of the surrounding environment.

== Transportation ==
- Baotou is a terminus for both the Baolan Railway and the Jingbao Railway, heading for Lanzhou in the west and Beijing in the east, respectively. The city is served by two main railway stations, Baotou East Railway Station, and Baotou Railway Station.
- Baotou Donghe International Airport serves the city with regular service to Beijing, Shanghai and Hong Kong.
- The city is connected by the Hubao Expressway to Inner Mongolia's capital, Hohhot.
- China National Highway 210
- Baotou Metro

== Geography ==
Baotou is located in the west of Inner Mongolia, located at the junction of two economic zones: the Bohai Economic Rim and the Upper Yellow River Natural Resources Enrichment Zone (黄河上游资源富集区). Its administrative area borders Mongolia's Dornogovi Province to the north, while the Yellow River, which flows for 214 kilometres (133 mi) in the prefecture, is south of the urban area itself. The Tumochuan Plateau (土默川平原), Hetao Plateau, and Yin Mountains cross the urban area and central part of the prefecture. Baotou City ranges in latitude from 41° 20' to 42° 40' N and in longitude from 109° 50' to 111° 25' E.

=== Climate ===
Baotou features a cold semi-arid climate (Köppen BSk), marked by long, cold and very dry winters, hot, somewhat humid summers, and strong winds, especially in spring. Temperatures often fall below −15 °C (5 °F) in winter and rise above 30 °C (86 °F) in summer. The annual precipitation is approximately 300 millimetres (11.8 in), with more than half of it falling in July and August alone. Due to the aridity and elevation, temperature differences between day and night can be large, especially in spring. In 2002, there were 12 instances of dust storms. Temperature extremes recorded since 1951 range from −31.4 °C (−25 °F) on 27 January 1971 (though an unofficial record low of −32.8 °C (−27 °F) on 23 December 1935) to 40.4 °C (105 °F) on 22 June 2005.

Climate data for Baotou, elevation 1,005 m (3,297 ft), (1991–2020 normals, extremes 1971–2010)
Month	Jan	Feb	Mar	Apr	May	Jun	Jul	Aug	Sep	Oct	Nov	Dec	Year
Record high °C (°F)	7.4 (45.3)	16.3 (61.3)	23.9 (75.0)	34.4 (93.9)	35.9 (96.6)	40.4 (104.7)	40.1 (104.2)	37.6 (99.7)	35.0 (95.0)	27.5 (81.5)	19.3 (66.7)	10.1 (50.2)	40.4 (104.7)
Mean daily maximum °C (°F)	−3.7 (25.3)	1.7 (35.1)	9.3 (48.7)	18.1 (64.6)	24.4 (75.9)	28.8 (83.8)	30.2 (86.4)	27.9 (82.2)	22.9 (73.2)	15.5 (59.9)	5.8 (42.4)	−2.2 (28.0)	14.9 (58.8)
Daily mean °C (°F)	−10.6 (12.9)	−5.5 (22.1)	2.1 (35.8)	10.8 (51.4)	17.3 (63.1)	22.2 (72.0)	24.0 (75.2)	21.8 (71.2)	15.9 (60.6)	7.9 (46.2)	−0.9 (30.4)	−8.5 (16.7)	8.0 (46.4)
Mean daily minimum °C (°F)	−16.0 (3.2)	−11.5 (11.3)	−4.2 (24.4)	3.4 (38.1)	9.7 (49.5)	15.2 (59.4)	18.2 (64.8)	16.1 (61.0)	10.0 (50.0)	2.0 (35.6)	−6.1 (21.0)	−13.6 (7.5)	1.9 (35.5)
Record low °C (°F)	−31.4 (−24.5)	−28.8 (−19.8)	−20.4 (−4.7)	−10.4 (13.3)	−3.0 (26.6)	3.2 (37.8)	10.5 (50.9)	4.9 (40.8)	−2.0 (28.4)	−11.8 (10.8)	−20.8 (−5.4)	−27.6 (−17.7)	−31.4 (−24.5)
Average precipitation mm (inches)	1.8 (0.07)	4.3 (0.17)	7.4 (0.29)	10.7 (0.42)	24.3 (0.96)	36.5 (1.44)	69.8 (2.75)	79.1 (3.11)	49.4 (1.94)	15.6 (0.61)	6.2 (0.24)	2.1 (0.08)	307.2 (12.08)
Average precipitation days (≥ 0.1 mm)	1.6	2.1	2.9	3.1	5.0	7.4	10.1	9.6	7.8	3.9	2.2	1.6	57.3
Average snowy days	3.3	3.2	2.8	0.9	0.1	0	0	0	0	0.9	2.3	3.5	17
Average relative humidity (%)	59	50	43	35	37	45	57	62	60	57	58	58	52
Mean monthly sunshine hours	199.0	207.2	248.2	270.6	292.1	270.7	261.2	253.6	231.3	234.5	197.1	189.3	2,854.8
Percentage possible sunshine	66	68	67	67	65	60	58	60	63	69	67	66	65
Source 1: China Meteorological Administration
Source 2: Weather China

== Administrative divisions ==
Baotou is divided into 10 county-level divisions, including 7 districts, 1 county and 2 banners.

Map
#	Name	Mongolian	Hanzi	Hanyu Pinyin	Population (2010 Census)	Area (km^{2})	Density (/km^{2})
1	Hondlon District	ᠬᠥᠨᠳᠡᠯᠡᠨ ᠲᠣᠭᠣᠷᠢᠭ (Köndelen toɣoriɣ)	昆都仑区	Kūndūlún Qū	726,838	301	2,415
2	Donghe District	ᠳᠦᠩᠾᠧ ᠲᠣᠭᠣᠷᠢᠭ (Düŋhė toɣoriɣ)	东河区	Dōnghé Qū	512,045	470	1,089
3	Qingshan District	ᠴᠢᠩᠱᠠᠨ ᠲᠣᠭᠣᠷᠢᠭ (Čiŋšan toɣoriɣ)	青山区	Qīngshān Qū	600,284	396	1,516
4	Shiguai District	ᠰᠢᠭᠤᠶᠢᠲᠤ ᠲᠣᠭᠣᠷᠢᠭ (Siɣuyitu toɣoriɣ)	石拐区	Shíguǎi Qū	35,803	761	47
5	Bayan'obo Mining District	ᠪᠠᠶᠠᠨ ᠣᠪᠣᠭ᠋᠎ᠠ ᠠᠭᠤᠷᠬᠠᠢ ᠶᠢᠨ ᠲᠣᠭᠣᠷᠢᠭ (Bayan Oboɣ-a Aɣurqai-yin toɣoriɣ)	白云鄂博矿区	Báiyún Èbó Kuàngqū	26,050	303	86
6	Jiuyuan District	ᠵᠢᠦᠶᠤᠸᠠᠨ ᠲᠣᠭᠣᠷᠢᠭ (Jiü yuvan toɣoriɣ)	九原区	Jiǔyuán Qū	195,831	734	267
8	Guyang County	ᠭᠦᠶᠠᠩ ᠰᠢᠶᠠᠨ (Güyaŋ siyan)	固阳县	Gùyáng Xiàn	175,574	5,025	35
9	Tumed Right Banner (Tumed Barun Banner)	ᠲᠦᠮᠡᠳ ᠪᠠᠷᠠᠭᠤᠨ ᠬᠣᠰᠢᠭᠤ (Tümed Baraɣun qosiɣu)	土默特右旗	Tǔmòtè Yòu Qí	276,453	2,368	116.7
10	Darhan Muminggan United Banner (Darhan Muminggan Holbot Banner)	ᠳᠠᠷᠬᠠᠨ ᠮᠤᠤᠮᠢᠩᠭᠠᠨ ᠬᠣᠯᠪᠣᠭᠠᠲᠤ ᠬᠣᠰᠢᠭᠤ (Darqan Muumiŋɣan Qolboɣatu qosiɣu)	达尔罕茂明安 联合旗	Dá'ěrhǎn Màomíng'ān; Liánhé Qí	101,486	17,410	5.8

== Gallery ==
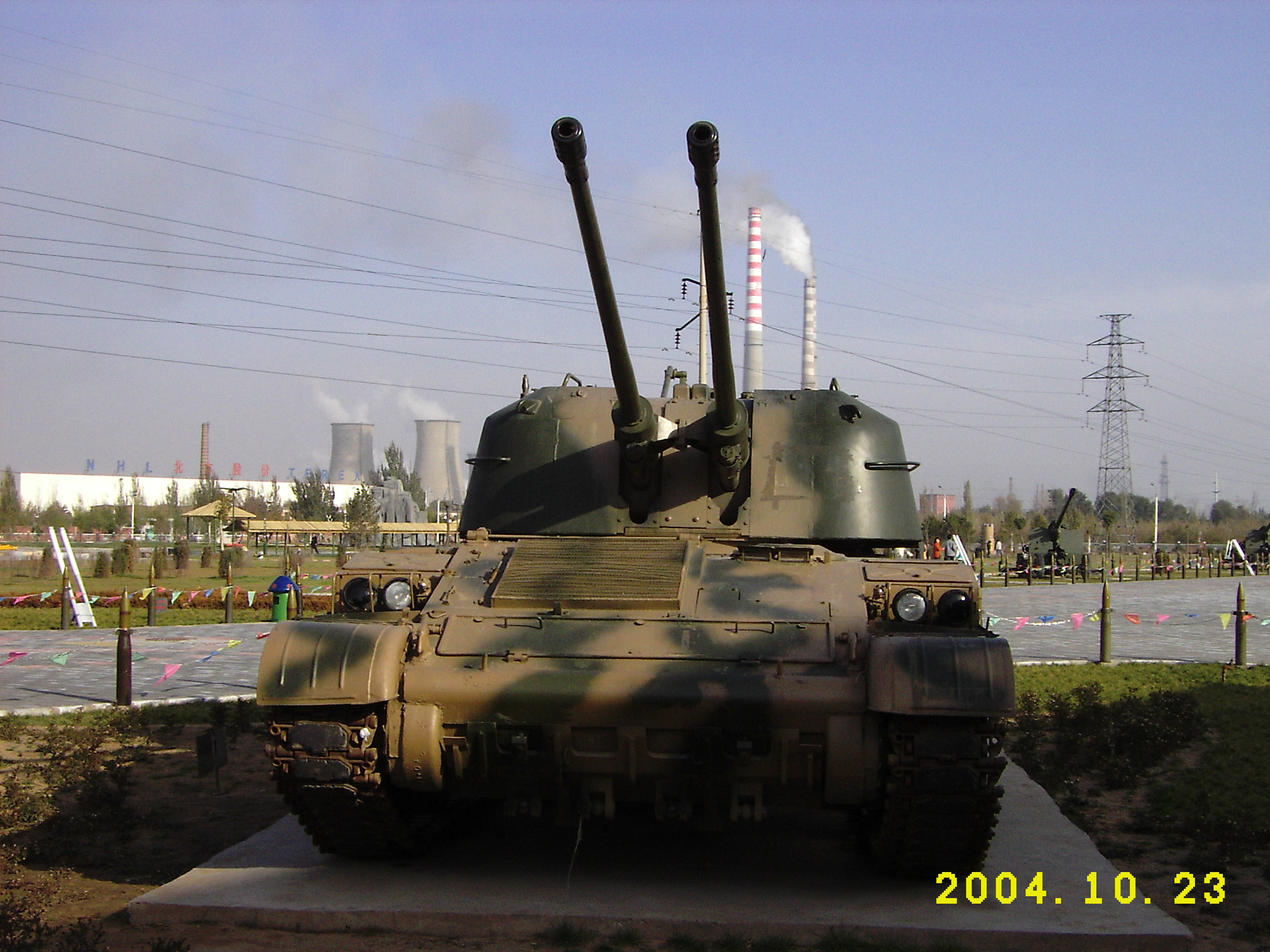
Northern Weapons Park

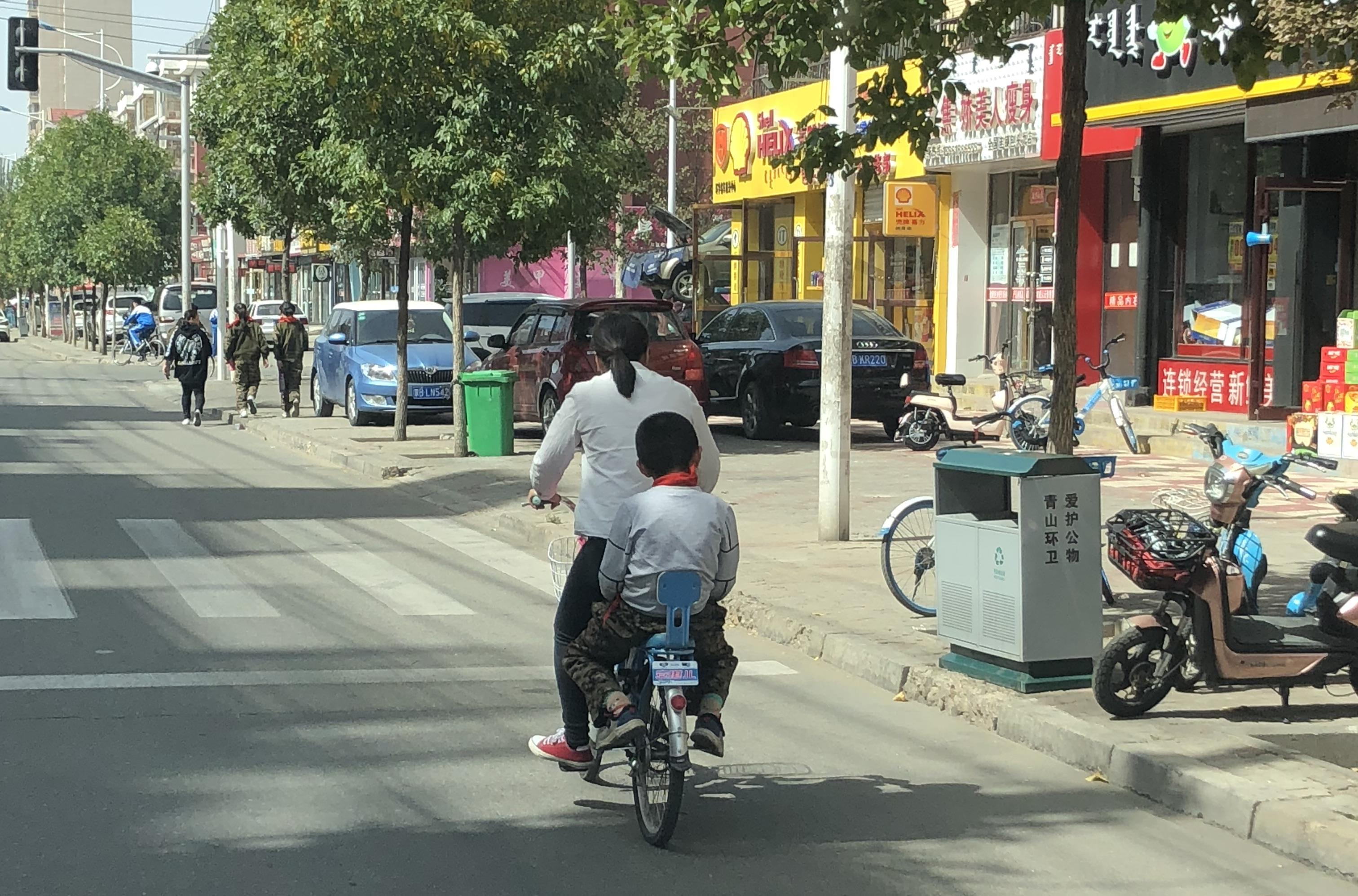
Trip home for lunch, area rebuilt after the earthquake

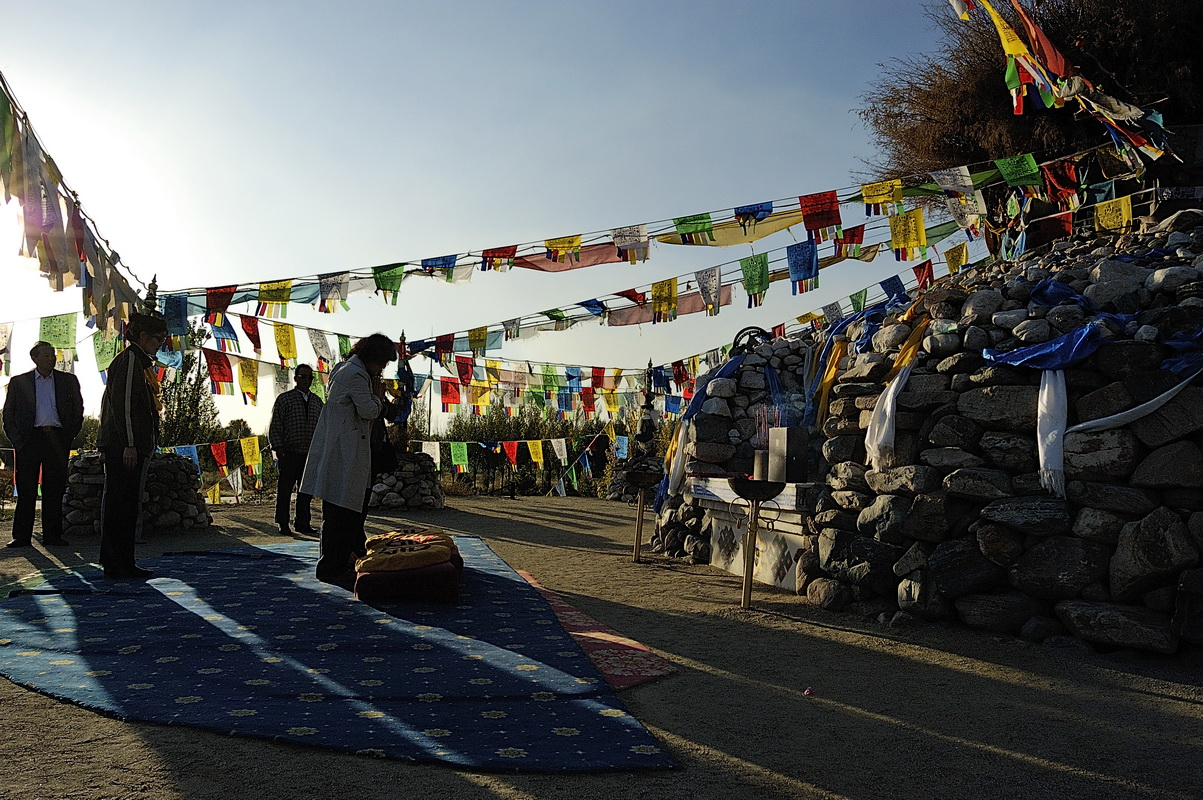
Aobao Shrine

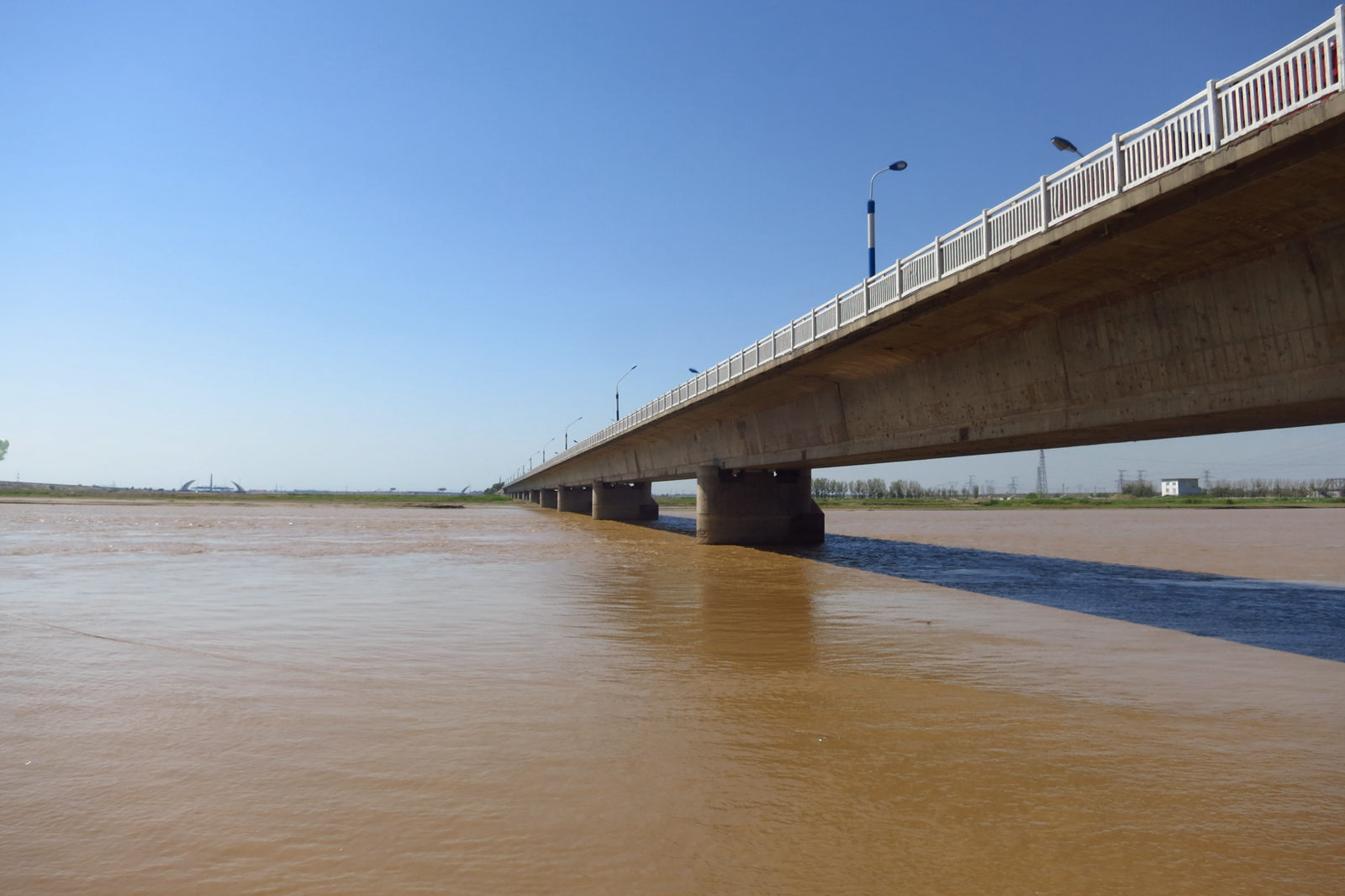
Bridge over the Yellow River

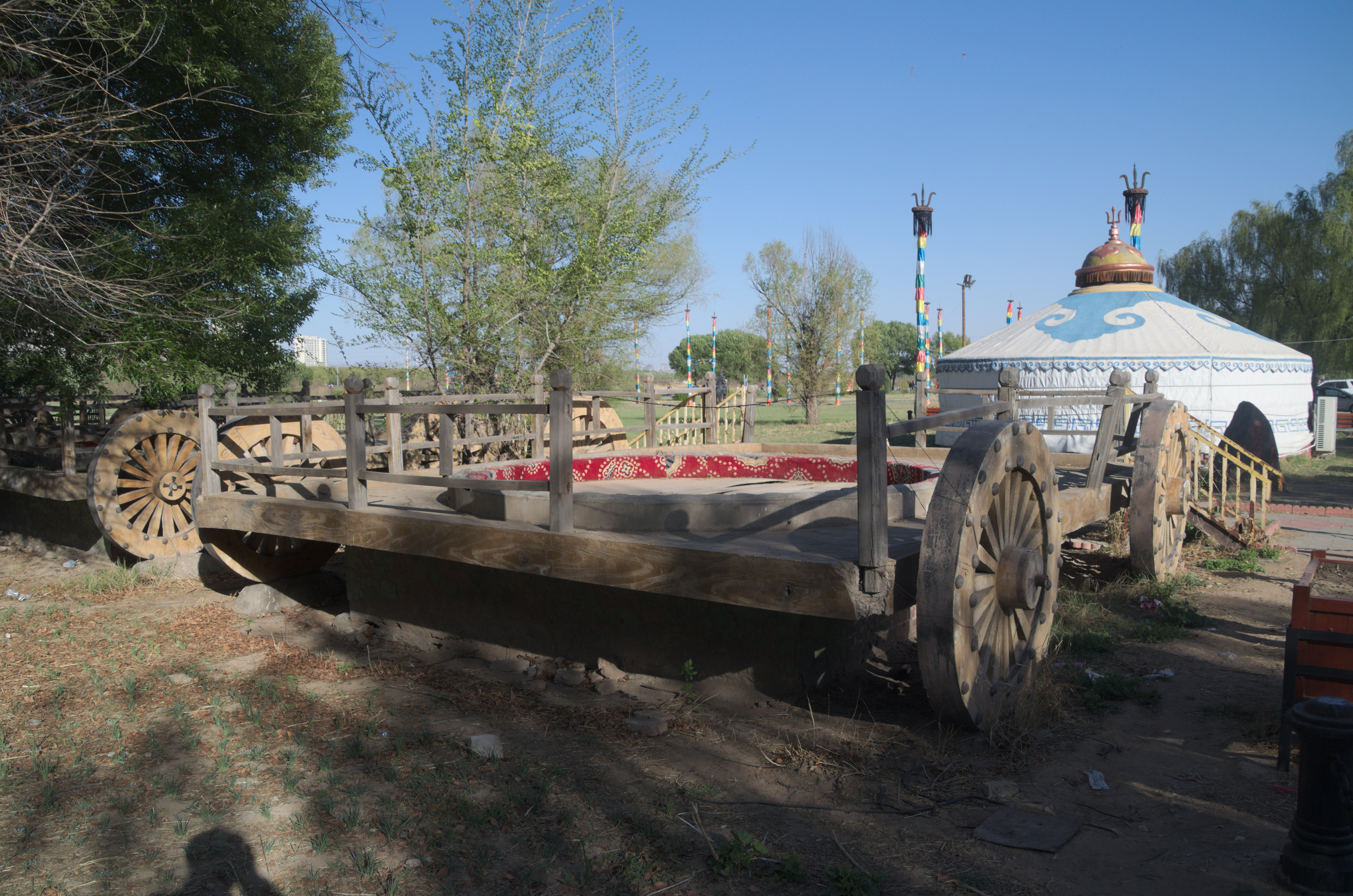
Baotou chariot and Yurt

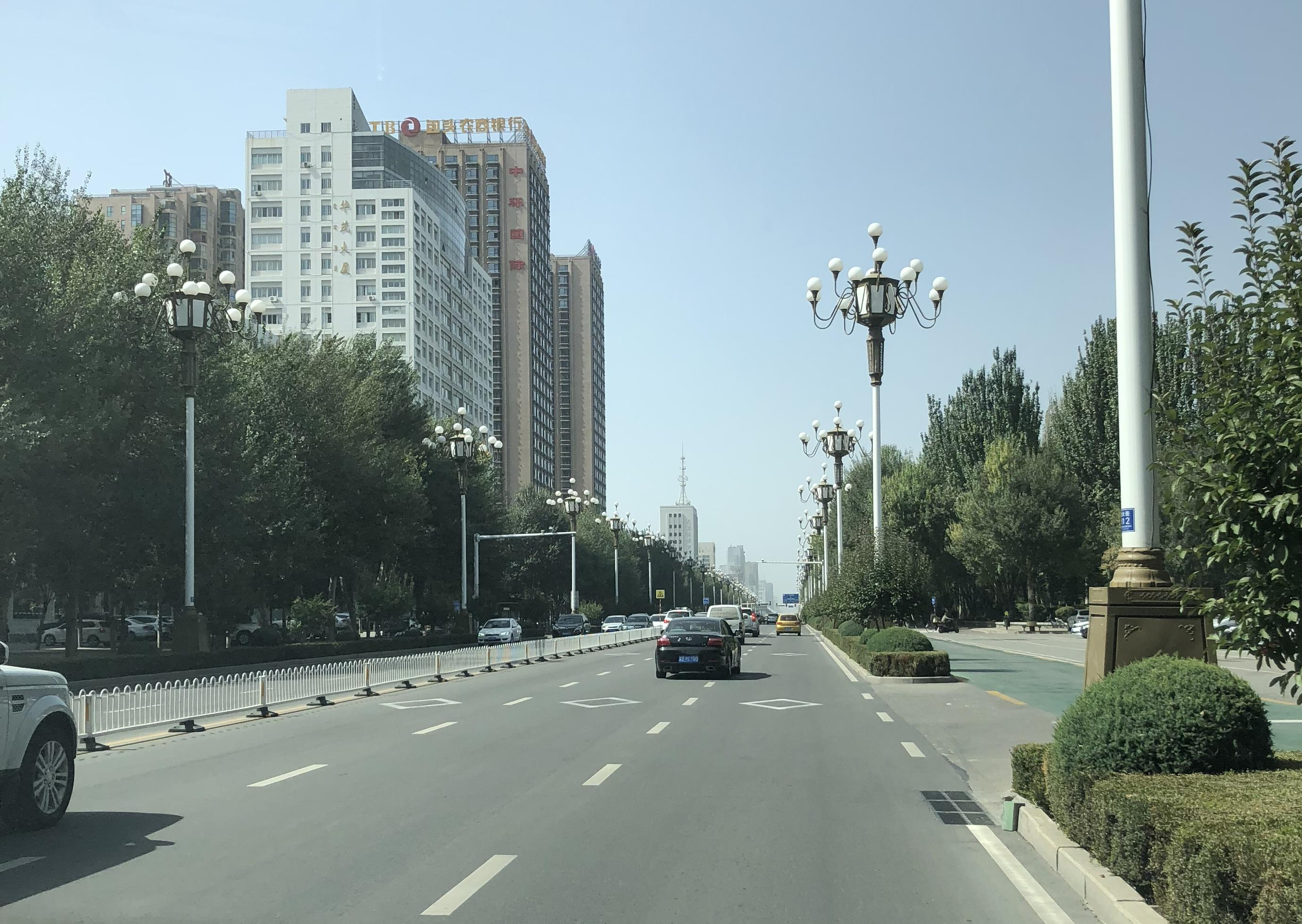
Main airport road, Baotou

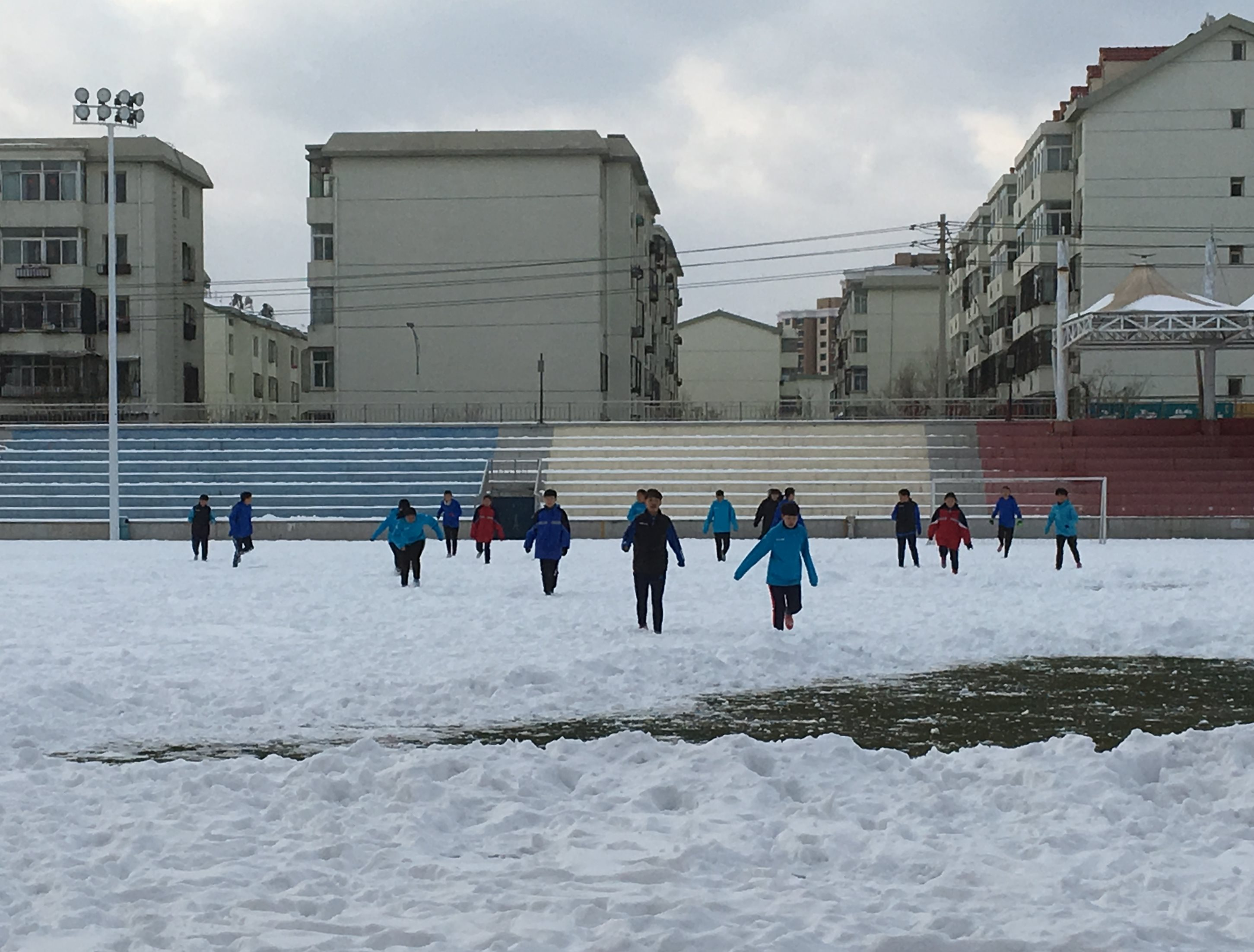
Students at Baotou Foreign Languages School playing soccer in the snow

== See also ==
- Chinese destroyer Baotou, named for the city
