= Gongzhufu station =

Train station

Coordinates: 40.834°N 111.6557°E

Gongzhufu 公主府站
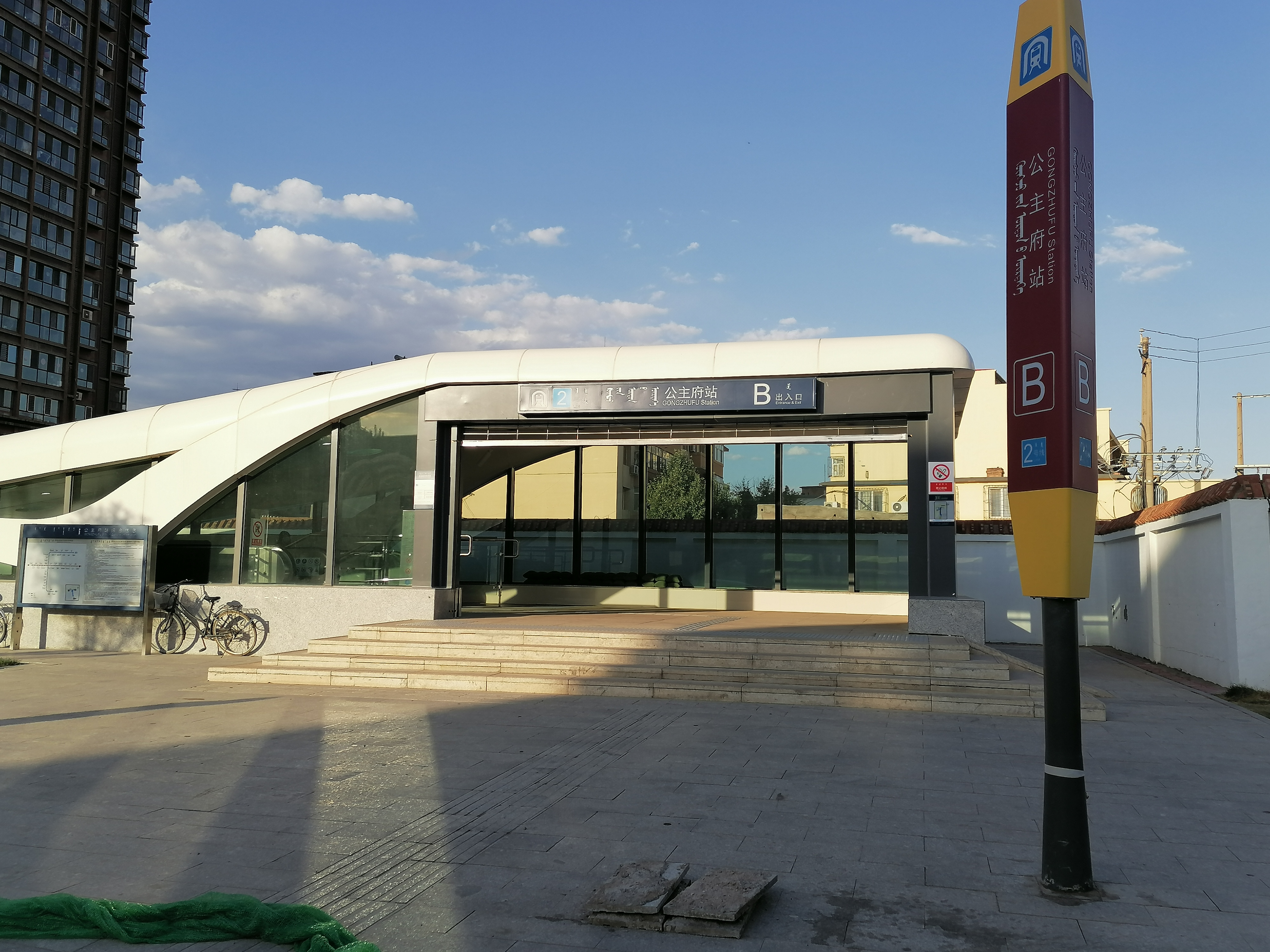
- ᠭᠦᠩᠵᠦ ᠶᠢᠨ ᠣᠷᠳᠣᠨ

General information
- Location: Xincheng District, Hohhot, Inner Mongolia, China
- Line: Line 2

History
- Opened: 1 October 2020; 5 years ago

Services
Preceding station	Hohhot Metro	Following station
Hohhot Stadium towards Talidonglu	Line 2	Hohhot Railway Station towards A'ershanlu
Location

Gongzhufu Station (Chinese: 公主府站) is a station on Line 2 of the Hohhot Metro. It opened on 1 October 2020.
