= Shuaijiaying station =

Train station

Shuaijiaying 帅家营站
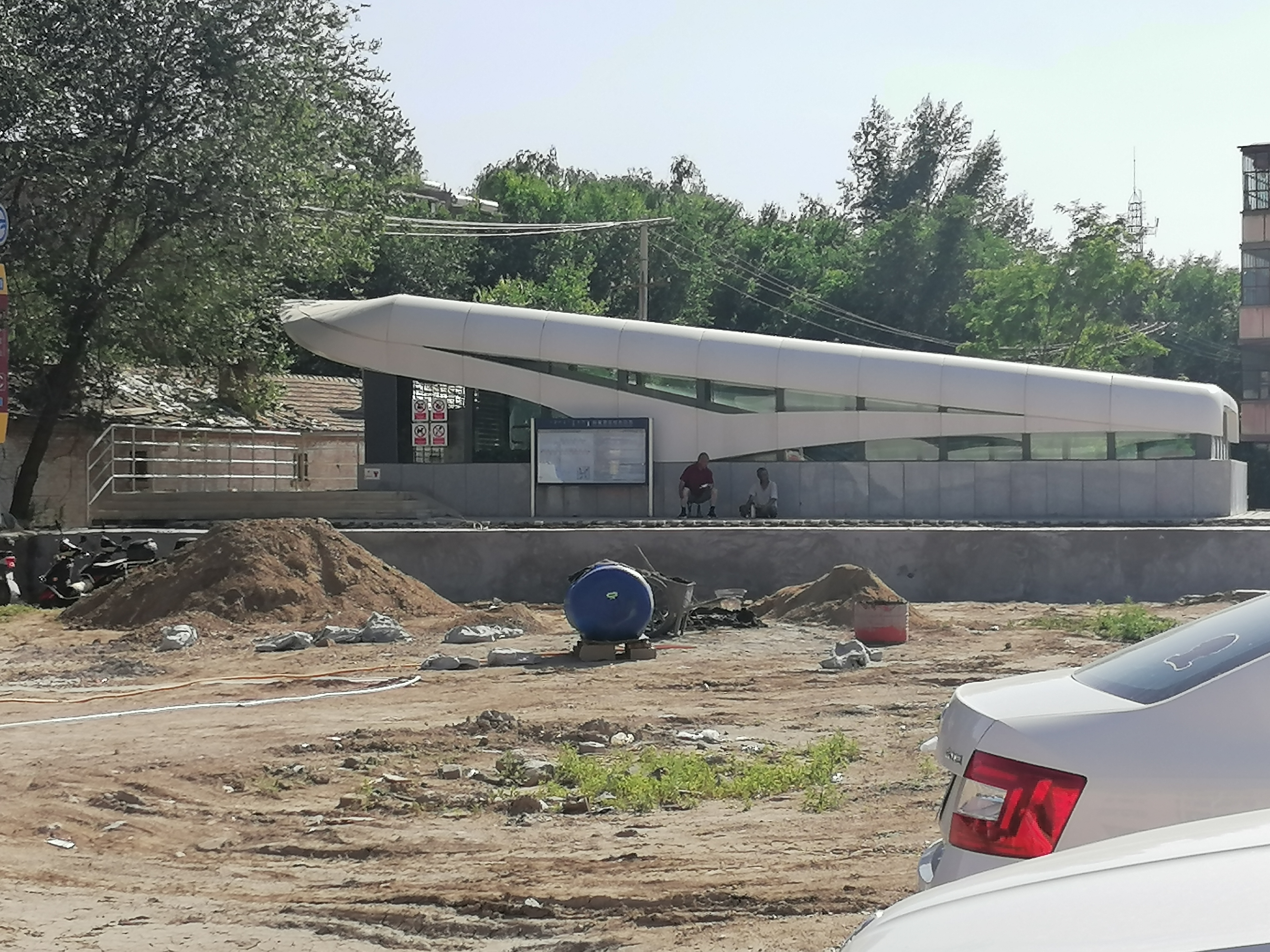
- ᠰᠢᠨ ᠳ᠋ᠢᠶᠠᠨ

General information
- Location: Yuquan District, Hohhot, Inner Mongolia, China
- Coordinates: 40.7543°N 111.7001°E
- Line: Line 2

History
- Opened: 1 October 2020; 5 years ago

Services
Preceding station	Hohhot Metro	Following station
Neida Nanxiaoqu towards Talidonglu	Line 2	Lamaying towards A'ershanlu
Location

Shuaijiaying Station (Chinese: 帅家营站) is a station on Line 2 of the Hohhot Metro. It opened on 1 October 2020.
