= Yuquan, Hohhot =

Yuquan 玉泉区 • ᠢᠦᠢ ᠴᠢᠦᠸᠠᠨ ᠲᠤᠭᠤᠷᠢᠭ
- District
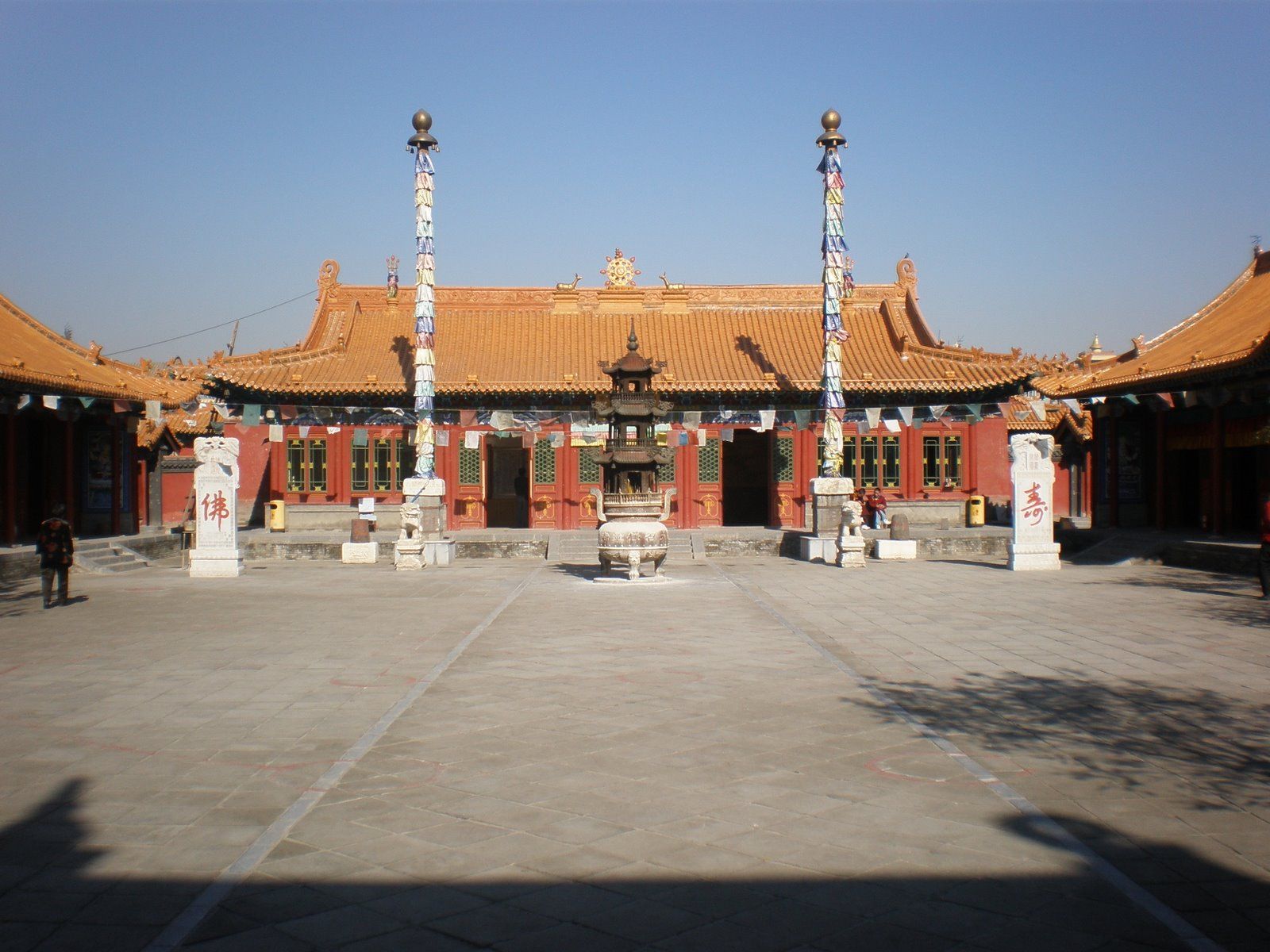
- Ih Juu (Dazhao Temple)

- Location within Inner Mongolia Location within China
- Coordinates: 40°45′13″N 111°40′26″E
- Country: China
- Autonomous region: Inner Mongolia
- Prefecture-level city: Hohhot
- District seat: Zhaojun Road Subdistrict

Area
  - Total: 179.3 km^{2} (69.2 sq mi)
- Elevation: 1,036 m (3,399 ft)

Population (2020)
  - Total: 524,573
  - Density: 2,926/km^{2} (7,577/sq mi)
- Time zone: UTC+8 (China Standard)
- Website: www.yuquan.gov.cn

Yuquan, Hohhot

Chinese name
- Simplified Chinese: 玉泉区
- Traditional Chinese: 玉泉區
- Literal meaning: jade spring
Transcriptions
Standard Mandarin
- Hanyu Pinyin: Yùquán Qū

Mongolian name
- Mongolian Cyrillic: Юйчюань тойрог
- Mongolian script: ᠢᠦᠢ ᠴᠢᠦᠸᠠᠨ ᠲᠤᠭᠤᠷᠢᠭ
Transcriptions
- SASM/GNC: Iui čiuvan toɣoriɣ

Yuquan District (Mongolian: ᠢᠦᠢ ᠴᠢᠦᠸᠠᠨ ᠲᠤᠭᠤᠷᠢᠭ; Chinese: 玉泉区) is one of the four districts of the prefecture-level city of Hohhot, the capital of Inner Mongolia Autonomous Region, China. Located in the southwest of the city center, it borders Huimin District to the north, Saihan District to the east, and Tumed Left Banner to the south and west.

Yuquan means "The spring as beautiful as jade" in Chinese, it was named after a spring nearby Dazhao Temple. The north side of Yuquan District is the old town of Guihua, the middle area was built in 1950-1980s, the south side was built after 1990s. The new campus of the University of Inner Mongolia is in the south side.

== Subdivisions ==
Yuquan District is made up of 8 subdistricts and 1 town.

Name	Simplified Chinese	Hanyu Pinyin	Mongolian (Hudum Script)	Mongolian (Cyrillic)	Administrative division code
Subdistricts
Bag Jo Omon Road Subdistrict	小召前街街道	Xiǎozhàoqiánjiē Jiēdào	ᠪᠠᠭ᠎ᠠ ᠵᠣᠣ ᠡᠮᠦᠨ᠎ᠡ ᠵᠡᠭᠡᠯᠢ ᠶᠢᠨ ᠵᠡᠭᠡᠯᠢ ᠭᠤᠳᠤᠮᠵᠢ	Бага жуу өмнө зээлийн зээл гудамж	150104001
Xinglong Alley Subdistrict	兴隆巷街道	Xīnglóngxiàng Jiēdào	ᠰᠢᠩ ᠯᠦᠩ ᠭᠤᠳᠤᠮᠵᠢ ᠶᠢᠨ ᠵᠡᠭᠡᠯᠢ ᠭᠤᠳᠤᠮᠵᠢ	Шин лүн гудамжийн зээл гудамж	150104002
Changhelang Subdistrict	长和廊街道	Chánghéláng Jiēdào	ᠴᠠᠩ ᠾᠧ ᠯᠠᠩ ᠵᠡᠭᠡᠯᠢ ᠭᠤᠳᠤᠮᠵᠢ	Цан ге лан зээл гудамж	150104003
Shidong Road Subdistrict	石东路街道	Shídōnglù Jiēdào	ᠱᠢ ᠳ᠋ᠦᠩ ᠵᠠᠮ ᠤᠨ ᠵᠡᠭᠡᠯᠢ ᠭᠤᠳᠤᠮᠵᠢ	Ши дүн замын зээл гудамж	150104004
Danan Street Subdistrict	大南街街道	Dànánjiē Jiēdào	ᠶᠡᠬᠡ ᠡᠮᠦᠨ᠎ᠡ ᠵᠡᠭᠡᠯᠢ ᠶᠢᠨ ᠵᠡᠭᠡᠯᠢ ᠭᠤᠳᠤᠮᠵᠢ	Их өмнө зээлийн зээл гудамж	150104005
Ordos Road Subdistrict	鄂尔多斯路街道	È'ěrduōsīlù Jiēdào	ᠣᠷᠳᠣᠰ ᠵᠠᠮ ᠳ᠋ᠡᠬᠢ ᠵᠡᠭᠡᠯᠢ ᠭᠤᠳᠤᠮᠵᠢ	Ордос зам даахь зээл гудамж	150104006
Xicaiyuan Subdistrict	西菜园街道	Xīcàiyuán Jiēdào	ᠰᠢ ᠼᠠᠢ ᠶᠤᠸᠠᠨ ᠤ ᠵᠡᠭᠡᠯᠢ ᠭᠤᠳᠤᠮᠵᠢ	Ший цай юаны зээл гудамж	150104007
Zhaojun Road Subdistrict	昭君路街道	Zhāojūnlù Jiēdào	ᠵᠣᠤ ᠵᠢᠶᠦ᠋ᠨ ᠵᠠᠮ ᠤᠨ ᠵᠡᠭᠡᠯᠢ ᠭᠤᠳᠤᠮᠵᠢ	Жуу жион замын зээл гудамж	150104008
Town
Xiaoheihe Town	小黑河镇	Xiǎohēihé Zhèn	ᠪᠠᠭ᠎ᠠ ᠾᠧᠢ ᠾᠧ ᠪᠠᠯᠭᠠᠰᠤ	Бага гей ге балгас	150104100

== Transport ==
=== Metro ===
Yuquan is currently served by one line and six stations of the Hohhot Metro.

2 - Daxuexijie, Nuohemule, Shuishang Park, Wuliying, Xilin Park, Neida Nanxiaoqu

== Climate ==
Climate data for Yuquan District, elevation 1,045 m (3,428 ft), (1991–2020 normals)
Month	Jan	Feb	Mar	Apr	May	Jun	Jul	Aug	Sep	Oct	Nov	Dec	Year
Mean daily maximum °C (°F)	−4.5 (23.9)	1.2 (34.2)	8.8 (47.8)	17.5 (63.5)	23.8 (74.8)	28.0 (82.4)	29.3 (84.7)	27.5 (81.5)	22.5 (72.5)	15.0 (59.0)	5.1 (41.2)	−2.8 (27.0)	14.3 (57.7)
Daily mean °C (°F)	−10.8 (12.6)	−5.7 (21.7)	1.9 (35.4)	10.2 (50.4)	16.8 (62.2)	21.5 (70.7)	23.3 (73.9)	21.4 (70.5)	15.7 (60.3)	8.0 (46.4)	−1.0 (30.2)	−8.7 (16.3)	7.7 (45.9)
Mean daily minimum °C (°F)	−15.9 (3.4)	−11.1 (12.0)	−3.9 (25.0)	3.3 (37.9)	9.6 (49.3)	15.0 (59.0)	17.7 (63.9)	16.0 (60.8)	10.1 (50.2)	2.6 (36.7)	−5.5 (22.1)	−13.2 (8.2)	2.1 (35.7)
Average precipitation mm (inches)	2.2 (0.09)	4.7 (0.19)	9.9 (0.39)	15.6 (0.61)	31.7 (1.25)	52.1 (2.05)	109.6 (4.31)	82.6 (3.25)	58.5 (2.30)	23.4 (0.92)	8.4 (0.33)	3.1 (0.12)	401.8 (15.81)
Average precipitation days (≥ 0.1 mm)	2.0	2.1	3.5	3.9	7.0	9.9	12.1	10.9	9.6	5.2	2.7	2.4	71.3
Average snowy days	3.7	3.4	3.6	1.0	0	0	0	0	0	0.4	3.1	4.0	19.2
Average relative humidity (%)	57	48	41	35	38	47	60	62	60	56	55	56	51
Mean monthly sunshine hours	196.8	204.4	249.4	270.6	283.4	266.5	256.4	253.5	231.3	226.2	191.8	182.8	2,813.1
Percentage possible sunshine	66	67	67	67	63	59	56	60	63	67	65	64	64
Source: China Meteorological Administration
