= Hohhot Stadium station =

Train station

Hohhot Stadium 呼和浩特体育场站
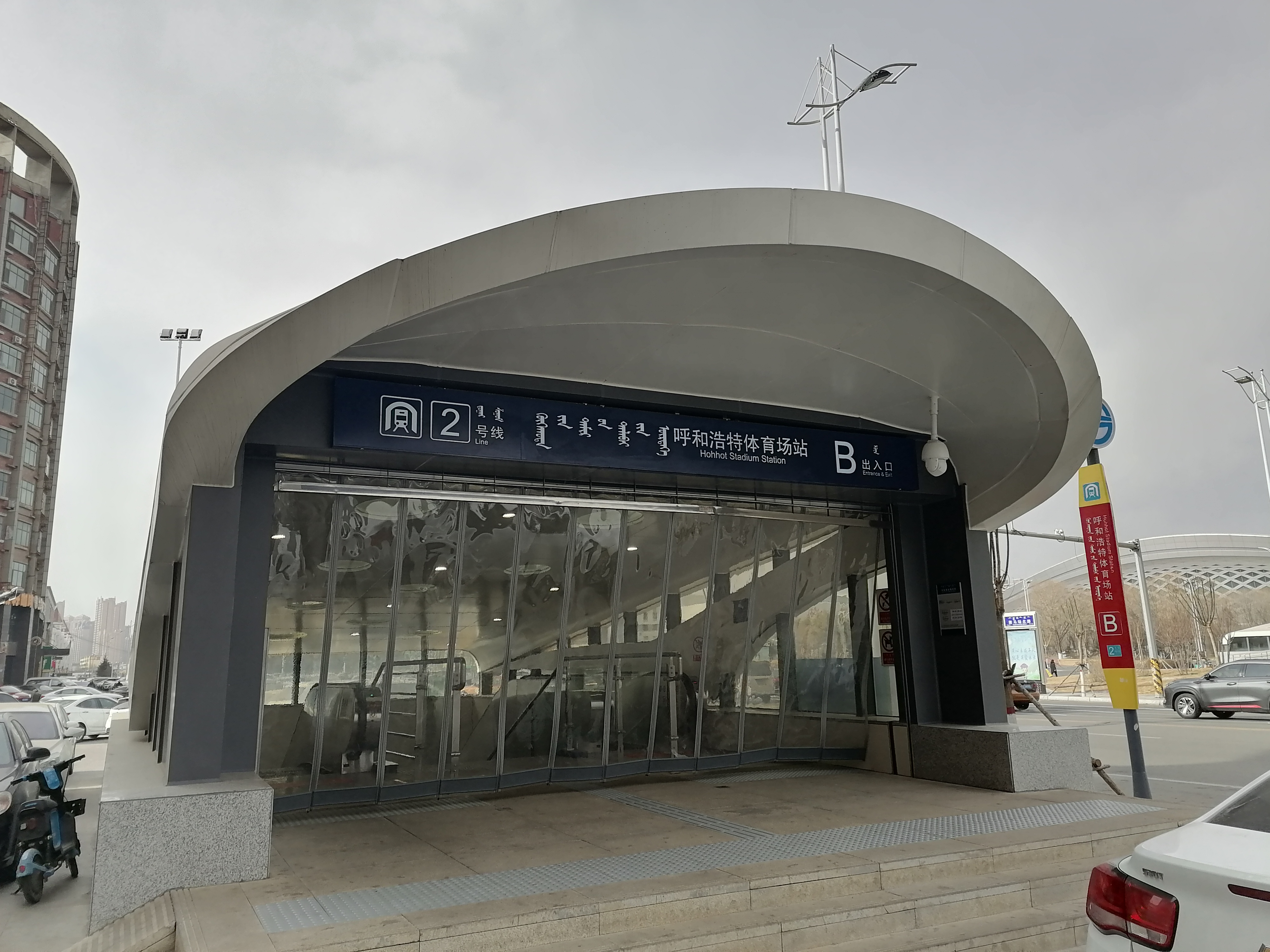
- ᠬᠥᠬᠡᠬᠣᠲᠠ ᠶᠢᠨ ᠲᠠᠮᠢᠷ ᠤᠨ ᠲᠠᠯᠠᠪᠠᠢ

General information
- Location: Xincheng District, Hohhot, Inner Mongolia, China
- Coordinates: 40°50′57.1″N 111°38′57.5″E
- Line: Line 2

History
- Opened: 1 October 2020; 5 years ago

Services
Preceding station	Hohhot Metro	Following station
Inner Mongolia Gymnasium towards Talidonglu	Line 2	Gongzhufu towards A'ershanlu
Location

Hohhot Stadium Station (Chinese: 呼和浩特体育场站) is a station on Line 2 of the Hohhot Metro. It opened on 1 October 2020, and serves the nearby Hohhot City Stadium.
