= Wuliying station =

Train station

Wuliying 五里营站
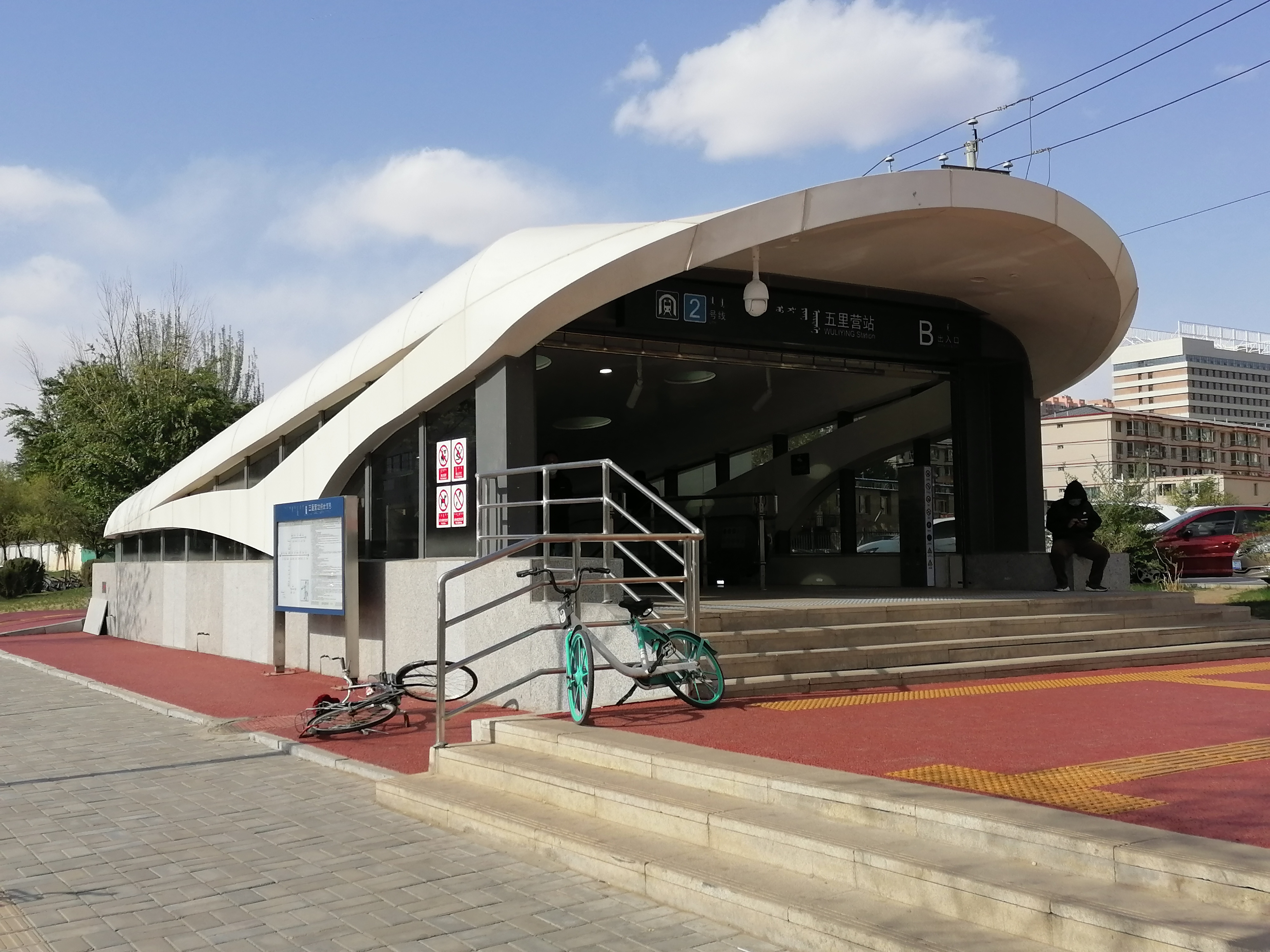
- ᠦ᠋ ᠯᠢ ᠶᠢᠩ

General information
- Location: Yuquan District, Hohhot, Inner Mongolia, China
- Coordinates: 40.7759°N 111.6781°E
- Line: Line 2

History
- Opened: 1 October 2020; 5 years ago

Services
Preceding station	Hohhot Metro	Following station
Shuishang Park towards Talidonglu	Line 2	Xilin Park towards A'ershanlu
Location

Wuliying Station (Chinese: 五里营站) is a station on Line 2 of the Hohhot Metro. It opened on 1 October 2020.
