= Haoqinying station =

Metro station in Hohhot, China

Haoqinying 毫沁营站
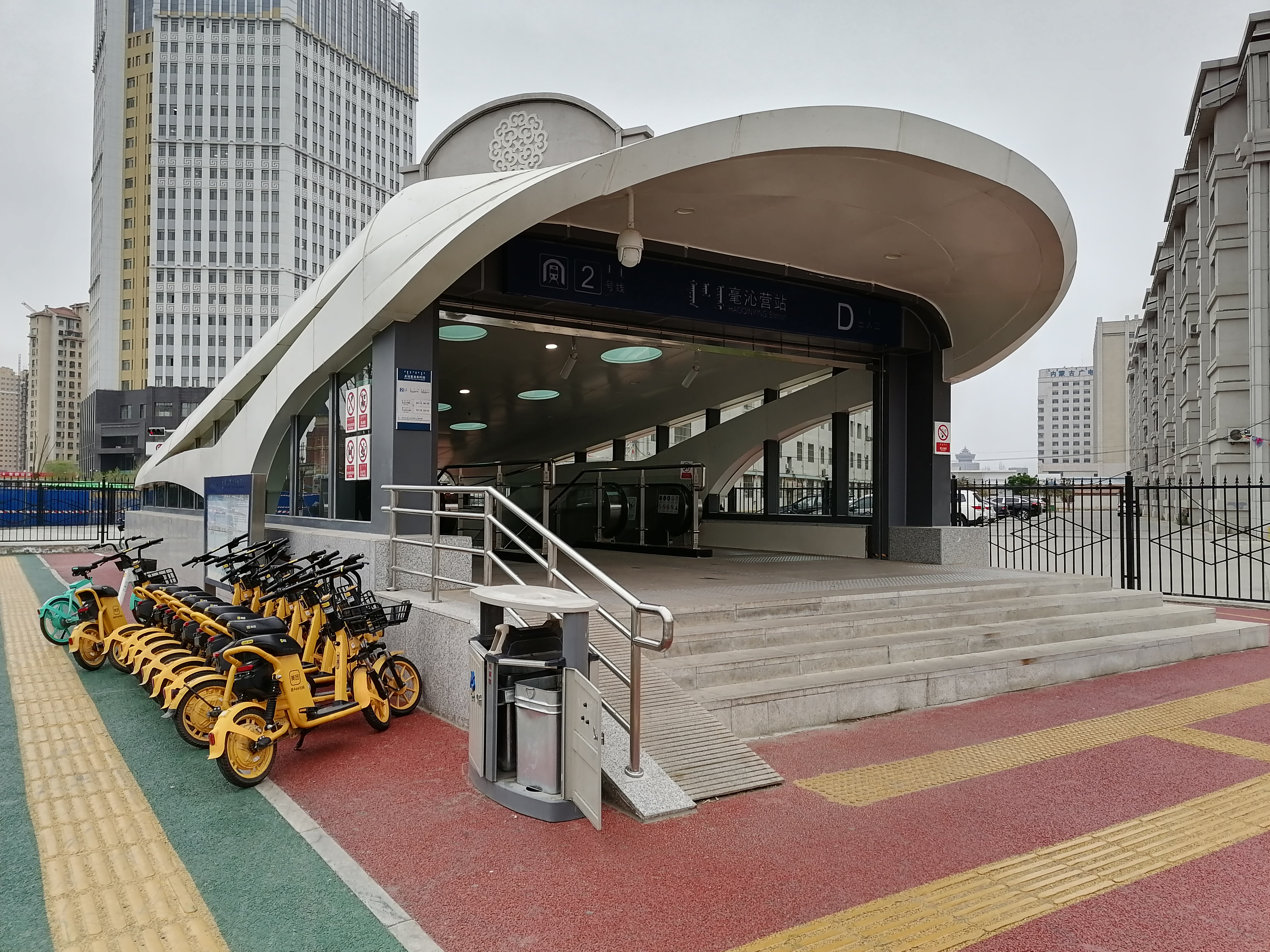
- ᠬᠠᠭᠤᠴᠢᠨ ᠠᠢᠯ

General information
- Location: Xincheng District, Hohhot, Inner Mongolia, China
- Coordinates: 40.8581°N 111.6842°E
- Line: Line 2

History
- Opened: 1 October 2020; 5 years ago

Services
Preceding station	Hohhot Metro	Following station
Genghis Khan Park towards Talidonglu	Line 2	Genghis Khan Square towards A'ershanlu
Location

Haoqinying Station (Chinese: 毫沁营站) is a station on Line 2 of the Hohhot Metro. It opened on 1 October 2020.
