= Xilin Park station =

Train station

Xilin Park 锡林公园站
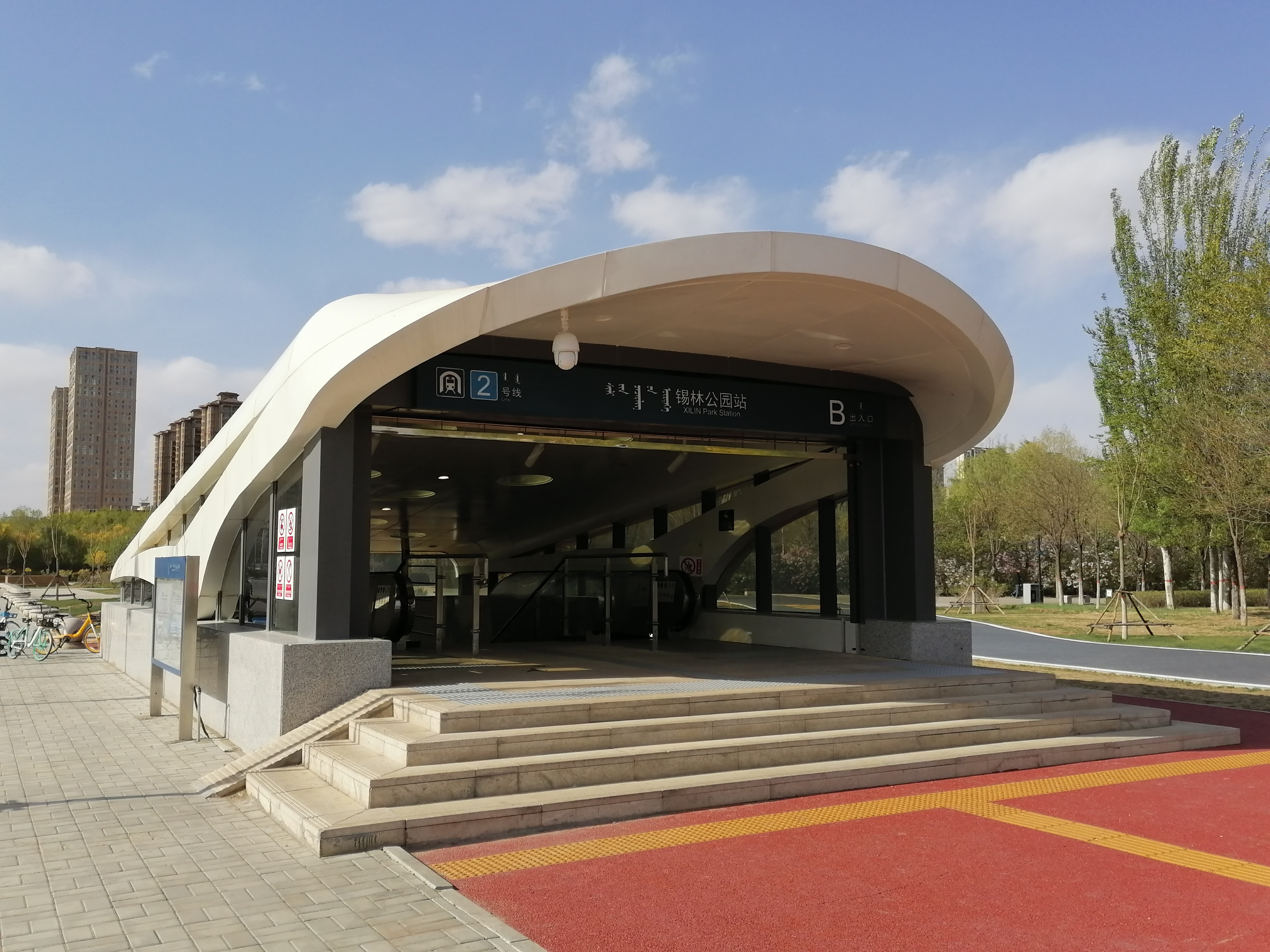
- ᠰᠢᠯᠢ ᠶᠢᠨ ᠴᠡᠴᠡᠷᠯᠢᠭ

General information
- Location: Yuquan District, Hohhot, Inner Mongolia, China
- Coordinates: 40.76965°N 111.68082°E
- Line: Line 2

History
- Opened: 1 October 2020; 5 years ago

Services
Preceding station	Hohhot Metro	Following station
Wuliying towards Talidonglu	Line 2	Neida Nanxiaoqu towards A'ershanlu
Location

Xilin Park Station (Chinese: 锡林公园站) is a station on Line 2 of the Hohhot Metro. It opened on 1 October 2020.
