= Sichouzhiludadao station =

Hohhot metro station

Sichouzhiludadao 丝绸之路大道站
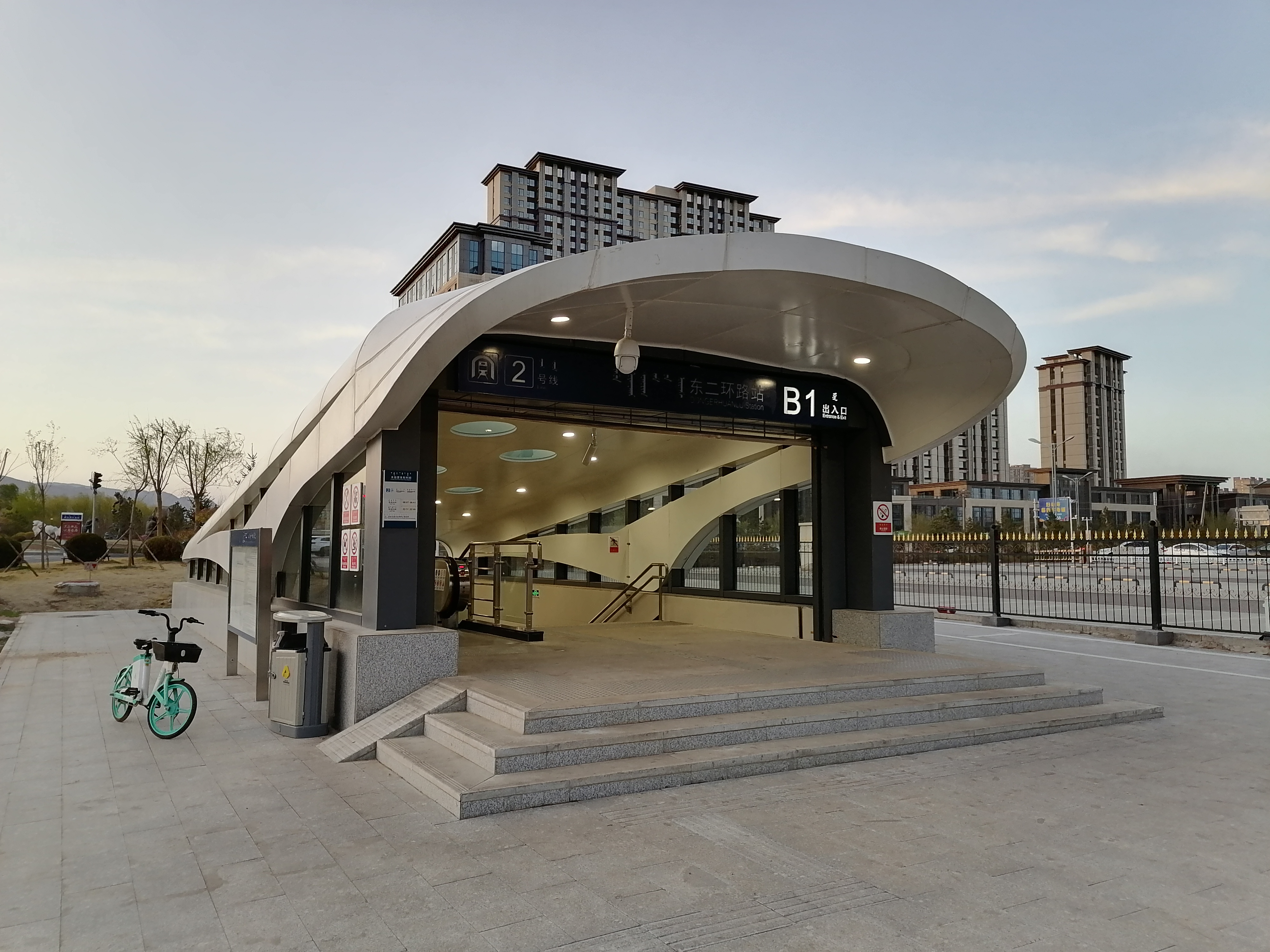
- ᠲᠣᠷᠭᠠᠨ ᠵᠠᠮ

General information
- Location: Xincheng District, Hohhot, Inner Mongolia, China
- Coordinates: 40.8578°N 111.7260°E
- Line: Line 2

History
- Opened: 1 October 2020; 5 years ago

Services
Preceding station	Hohhot Metro	Following station
Beishan Park towards Talidonglu	Line 2	Yijiacun towards A'ershanlu
Location

Sichouzhiludadao station (Chinese: 丝绸之路大道站; pinyin: Sīchóu Zhīlù Dàdào Zhàn) is a station on Line 2 of the Hohhot Metro. It opened on 1 October 2020 as Dongerhuanlu station, and was renamed as Sichouzhiludadao station on 1 November 2023.
