= Baihelu station =

Train station

Baihelu 百合路站
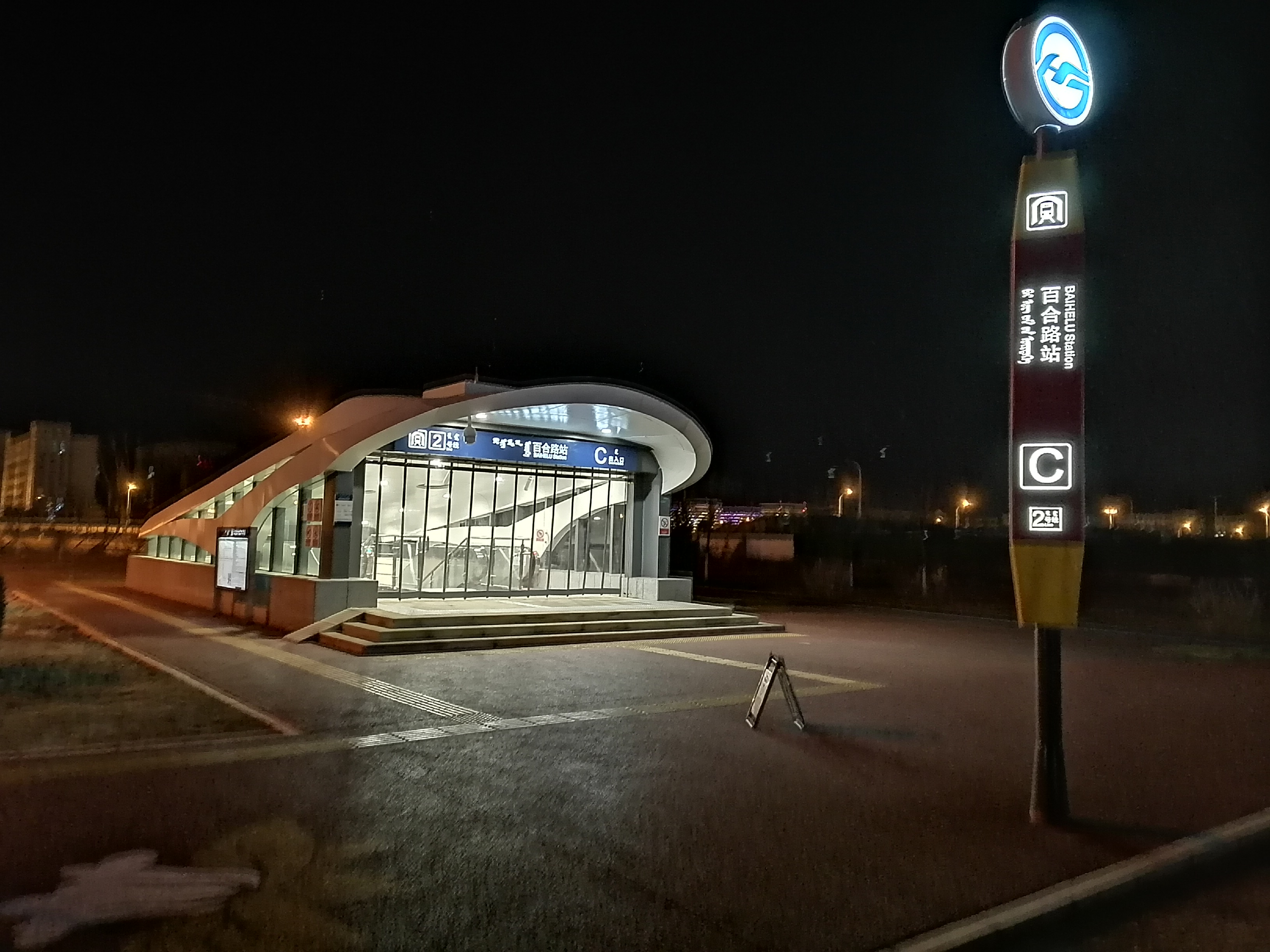
- ᠪᠠᠢ ᠾᠧ ᠵᠠᠮ

General information
- Location: Xincheng District, Hohhot, Inner Mongolia, China
- Coordinates: 40°51′50″N 111°45′06″E
- Line: Line 2

History
- Opened: 1 October 2020; 5 years ago

Services
Preceding station	Hohhot Metro	Following station
Xindian towards Talidonglu	Line 2	Beishan Park towards A'ershanlu
Location

Baihelu Station (Chinese: 百合路站) is a station on Line 2 of the Hohhot Metro. It opened on 1 October 2020.
