= Neida Nanxiaoqu station =

Train station

Neida Nanxiaoqu 内大南校区站
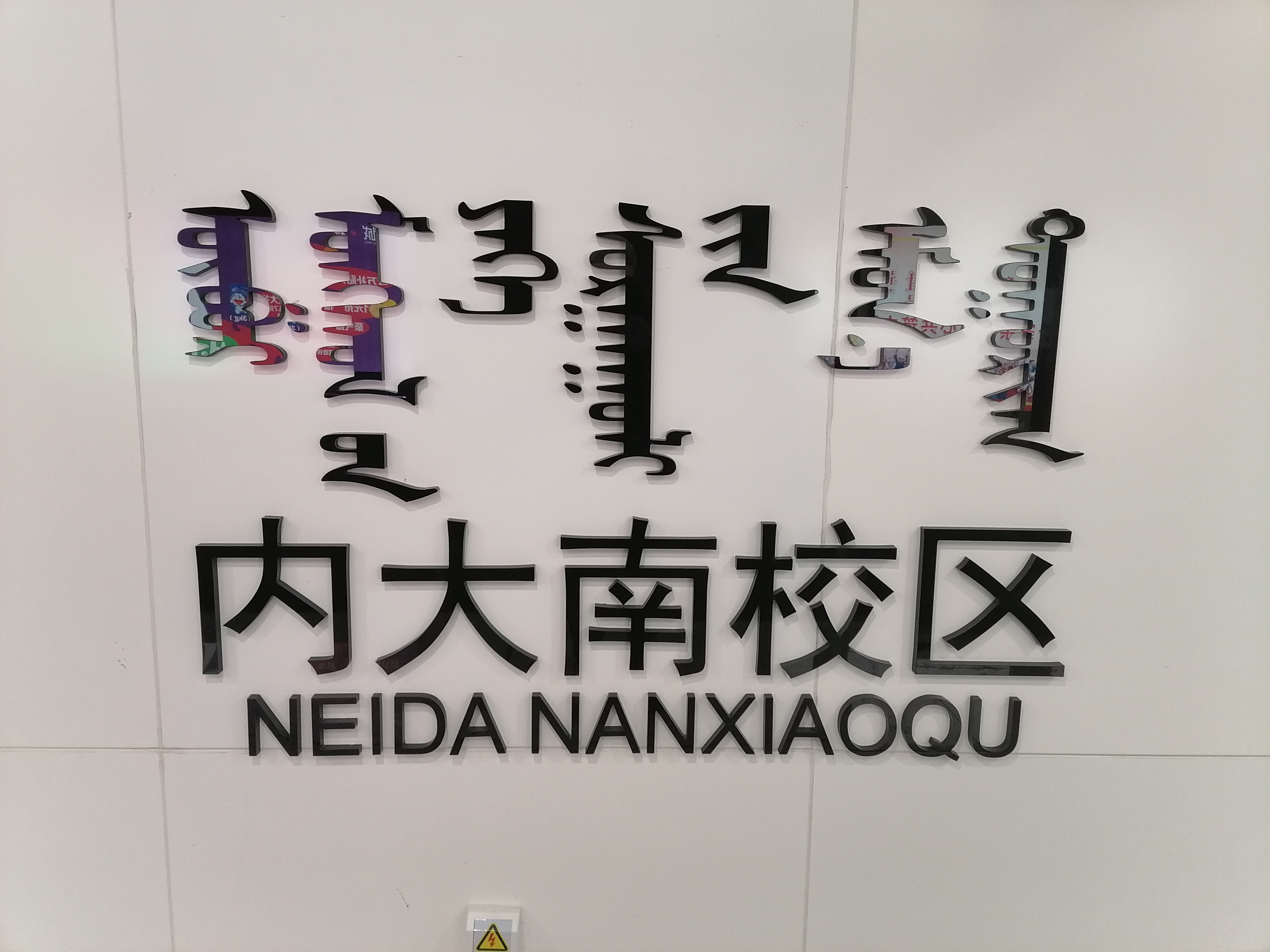
- 40.7578°N 111.6856°E
- ᠥᠪᠥᠷ ᠮᠣᠩᠭᠣᠯ ᠤᠨ ᠶᠡᠬᠡ ᠰᠤᠷᠭᠠᠭᠤᠯᠢ ᠶᠢᠨ ᠡᠮᠦᠨ᠎ᠡ ᠲᠣᠭᠣᠷᠢᠭ

General information
- Location: Yuquan District, Hohhot, Inner Mongolia, China
- Line: Line 2

History
- Opened: 1 October 2020; 5 years ago

Services
Preceding station	Hohhot Metro	Following station
Xilin Park towards Talidonglu	Line 2	Shuaijiaying towards A'ershanlu
Location

Neida Nanxiaoqu Station (Chinese: 内大南校区站) is a station on Line 2 of the Hohhot Metro. It opened on 1 October 2020, and serves the southern campus of Inner Mongolia University.
