= Genghis Khan Park station =

Metro station in Hohhot, China

Genghis Khan Park 成吉思汗公园站
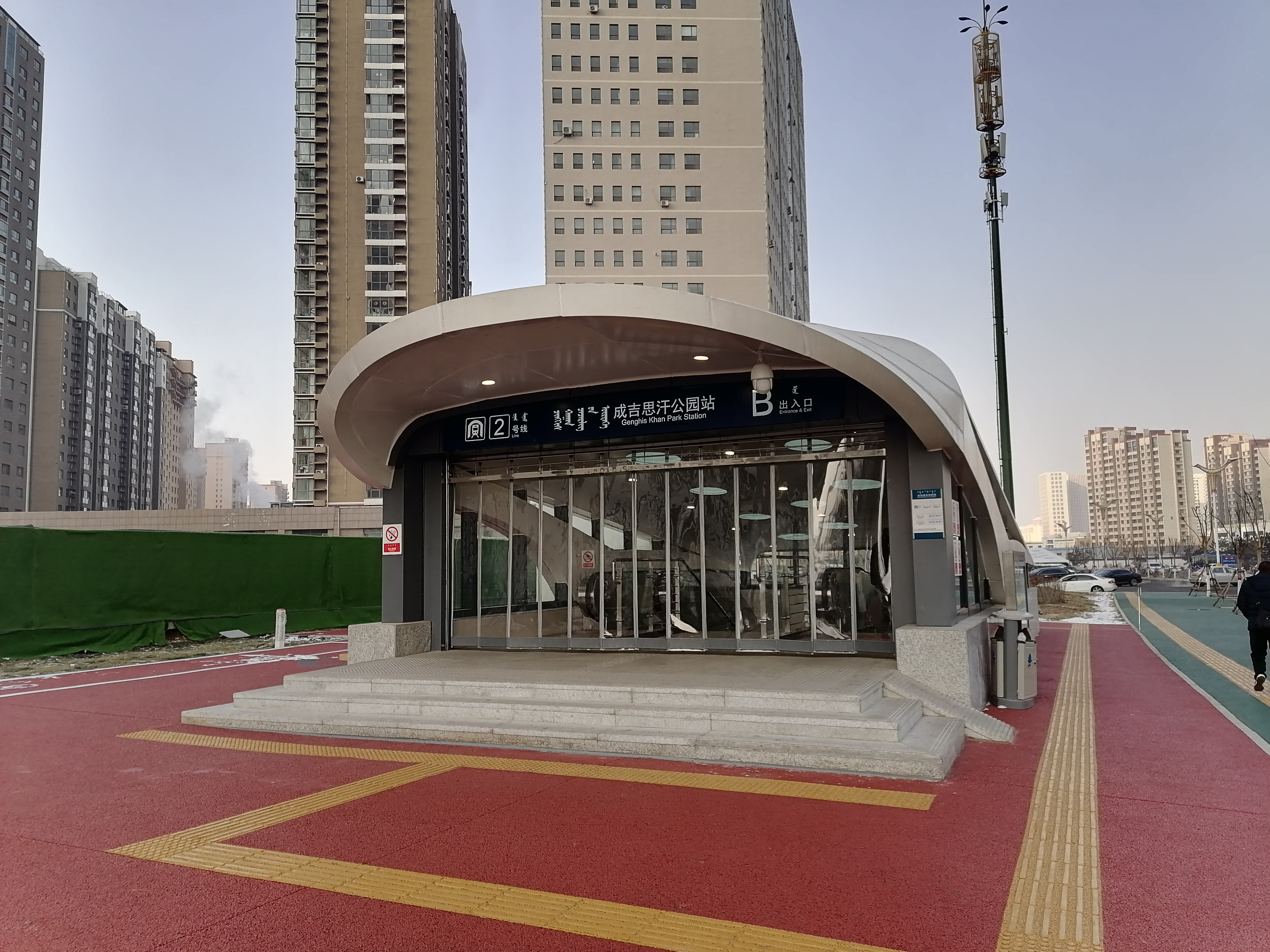
- ᠴᠢᠩᠭᠢᠰ ᠬᠠᠭᠠᠨ ᠴᠡᠴᠡᠷᠯᠢᠭ

General information
- Location: Xincheng District, Hohhot, Inner Mongolia, China
- Coordinates: 40°51′37″N 111°41′52″E
- Line: Line 2

History
- Opened: 1 October 2020; 5 years ago

Services
Preceding station	Hohhot Metro	Following station
Yijiacun towards Talidonglu	Line 2	Haoqinying towards A'ershanlu
Location

Genghis Khan Park Station (Chinese: 成吉思汗公园站) is a station on Line 2 of the Hohhot Metro. It opened on 1 October 2020.
