= Beishan Park station =

Hohhot metro station

Beishan Park 北山公园站
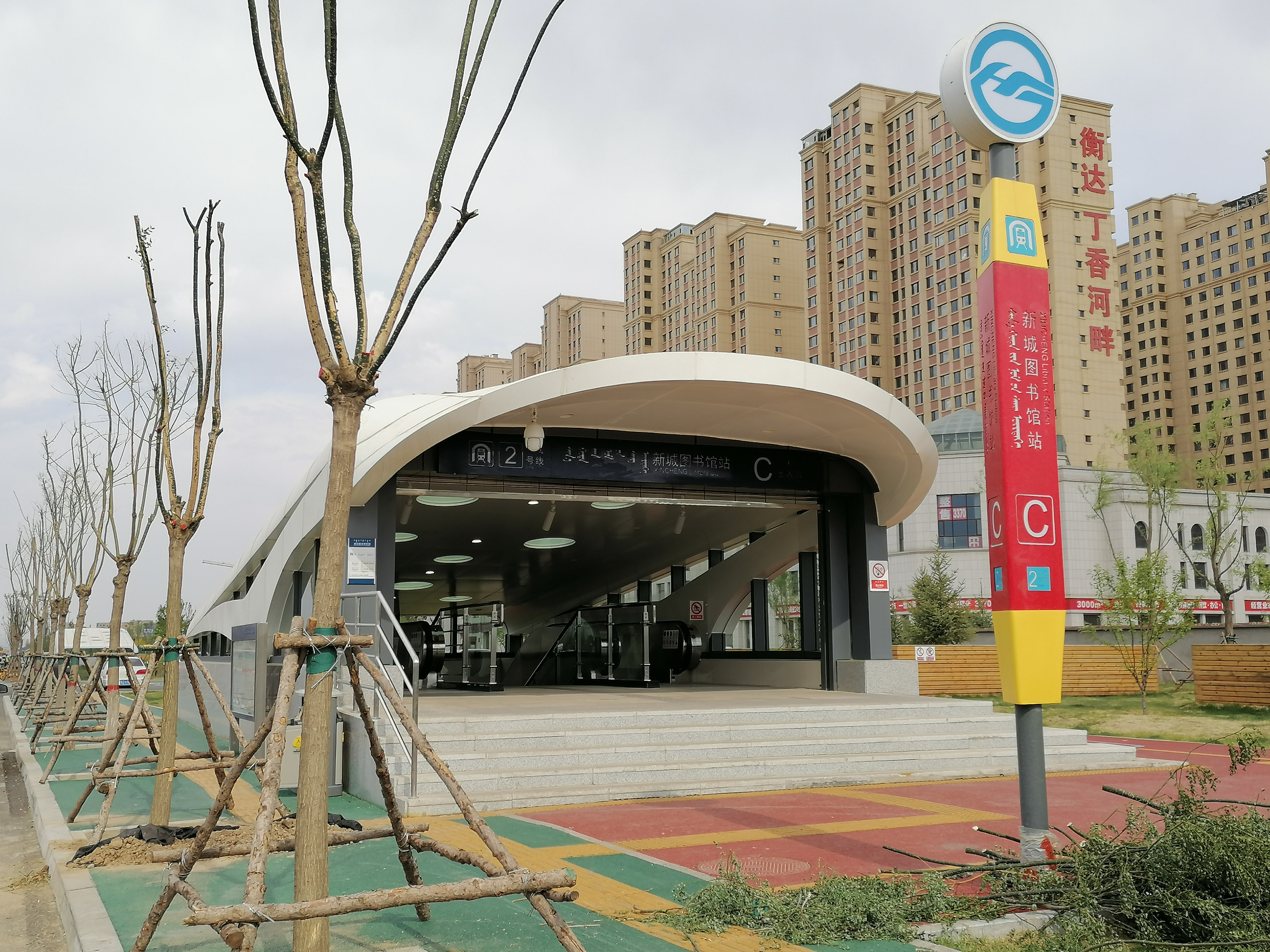
- ᠬᠣᠢᠲᠤ ᠠᠭᠤᠯᠠ ᠴᠡᠴᠡᠷᠯᠵᠭ

General information
- Location: Xincheng District, Hohhot, Inner Mongolia, China
- Coordinates: 40.8611°N 111.7404°E
- Line: Line 2

History
- Opened: 1 October 2020; 5 years ago

Services
Preceding station	Hohhot Metro	Following station
Baihelu towards Talidonglu	Line 2	Sichouzhiludadao towards A'ershanlu
Location

Beishan Park station (Chinese: 北山公园站; pinyin: Běishān Gōngyuán zhàn) is a station on Line 2 of the Hohhot Metro. The station is named after the Beishan Park. It is located in Xincheng District, Hohhot.

The station opened on 1 October 2020 as Xincheng Library station, and was renamed as Beishan Park station on 1 November 2023.
