= Yijiacun station =

Station of Hohhot Metro

Yijiacun 一家村站
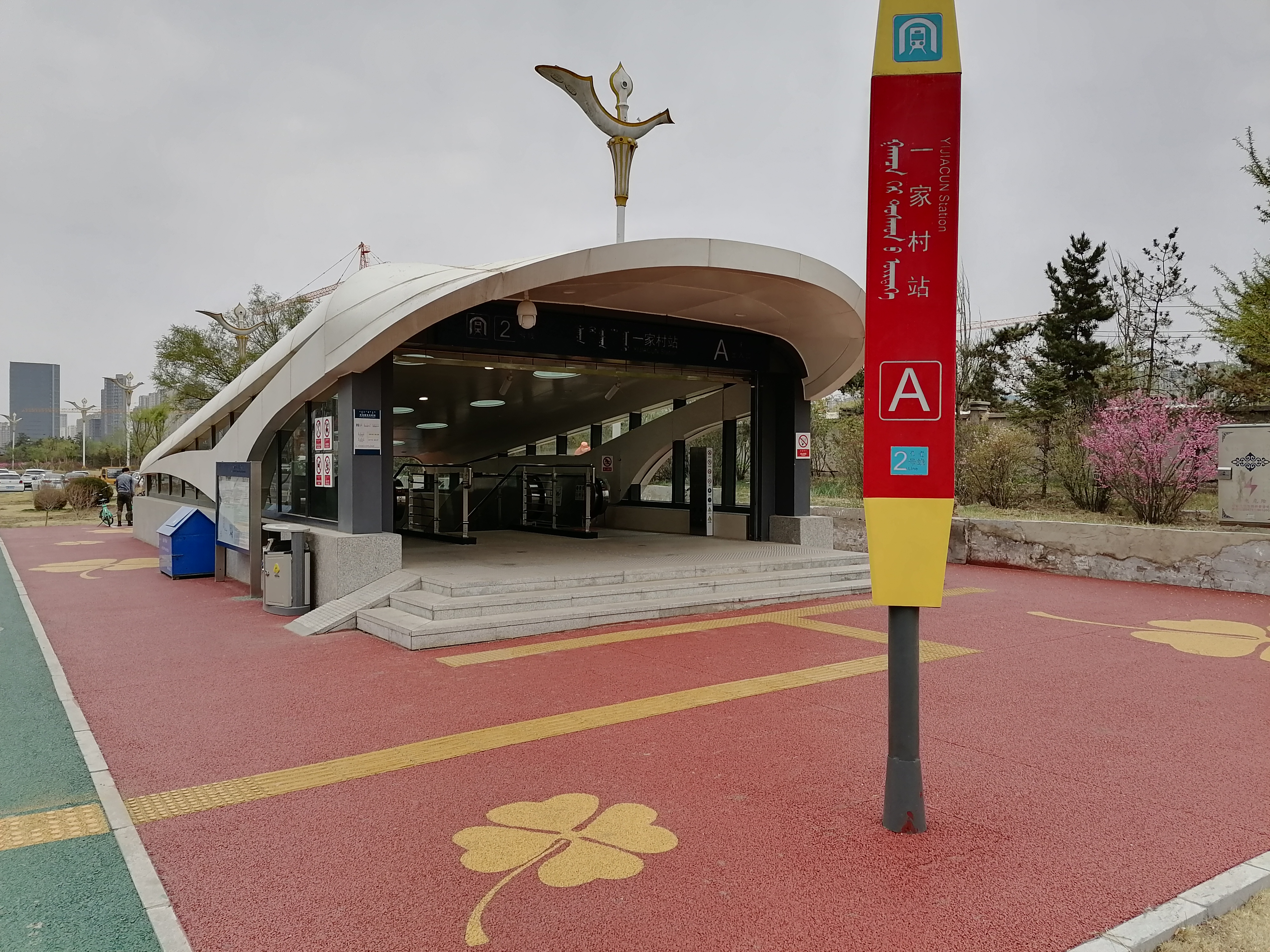
- ᠰᠢᠨ ᠳ᠋ᠢᠶᠠᠨ

General information
- Location: Xincheng District, Hohhot, Inner Mongolia, China
- Coordinates: 40.8580°N 111.7116°E
- Line: Line 2

History
- Opened: 1 October 2020; 5 years ago

Services
| Preceding station | Hohhot Metro | Following station |
|---|---|---|
| Sichouzhiludadao towards Talidonglu | Line 2 | Genghis Khan Park towards A'ershanlu |
Location

Yijiacun Station (Chinese: 一家村站) is a station on Line 2 of the Hohhot Metro. It opened on 1 October 2020. The name literally translates to 'One Family Village'.
