= Inner Mongolia Gymnasium station =

Train station

Coordinates: 40.8546°N 111.6576°E

Inner Mongolia Gymnasium 内蒙古体育馆站
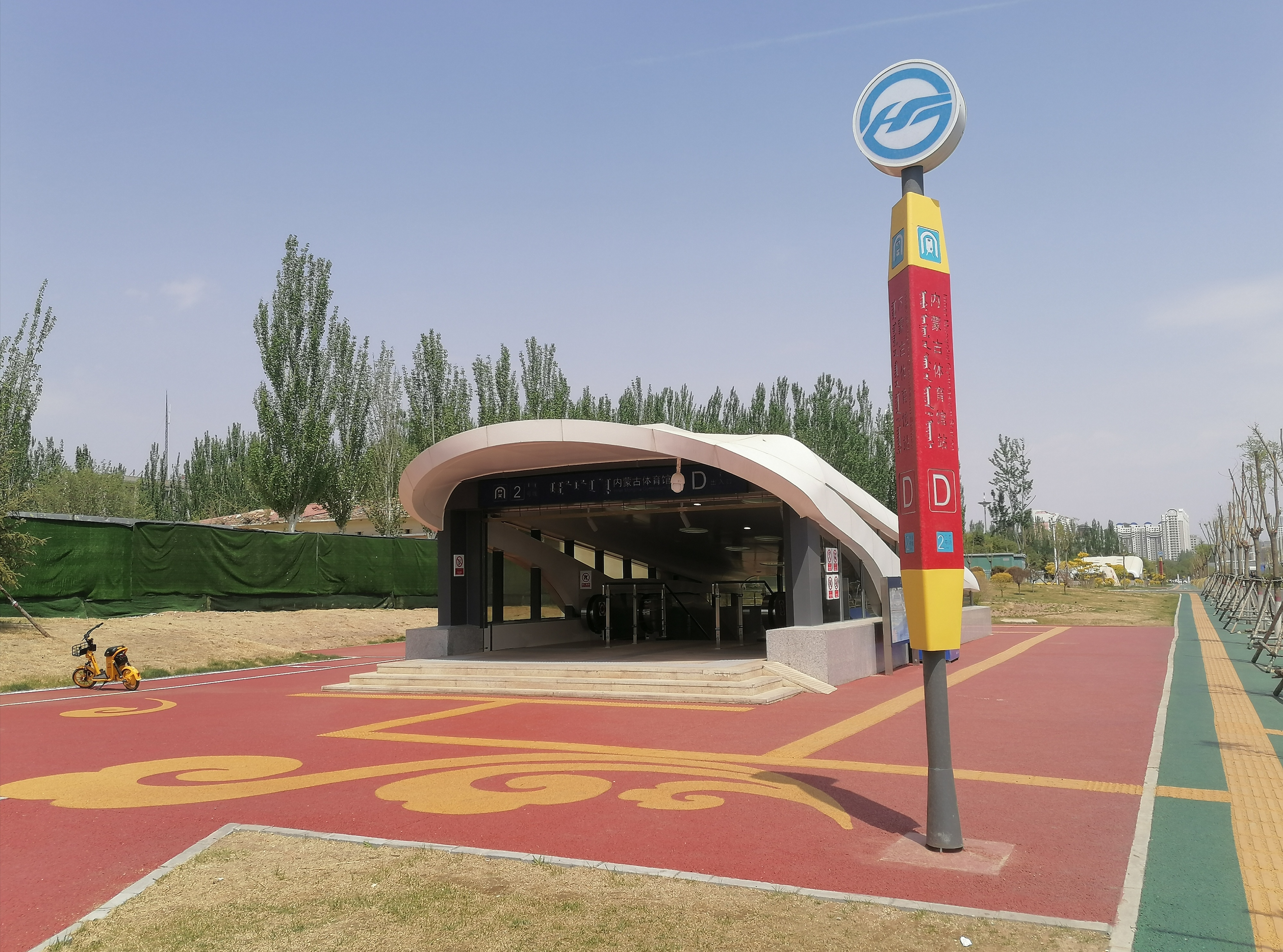
- ᠥᠪᠥᠷ ᠮᠣᠩᠭᠣᠯ ᠤᠨ ᠲᠠᠮᠢᠷ ᠤᠨ ᠣᠷᠳᠣ

General information
- Location: Xincheng District, Hohhot, Inner Mongolia, China
- Line: Line 2

History
- Opened: 1 October 2020; 5 years ago

Services
Preceding station	Hohhot Metro	Following station
Genghis Khan Square towards Talidonglu	Line 2	Hohhot Stadium towards A'ershanlu
Location

Inner Mongolia Gymnasium Station (Chinese: 内蒙古体育馆站) is a station on Line 2 of the Hohhot Metro. It opened on 1 October 2020.
