= Genghis Khan Square station =

Metro station in Hohhot, China

Genghis Khan Square 成吉思汗广场站
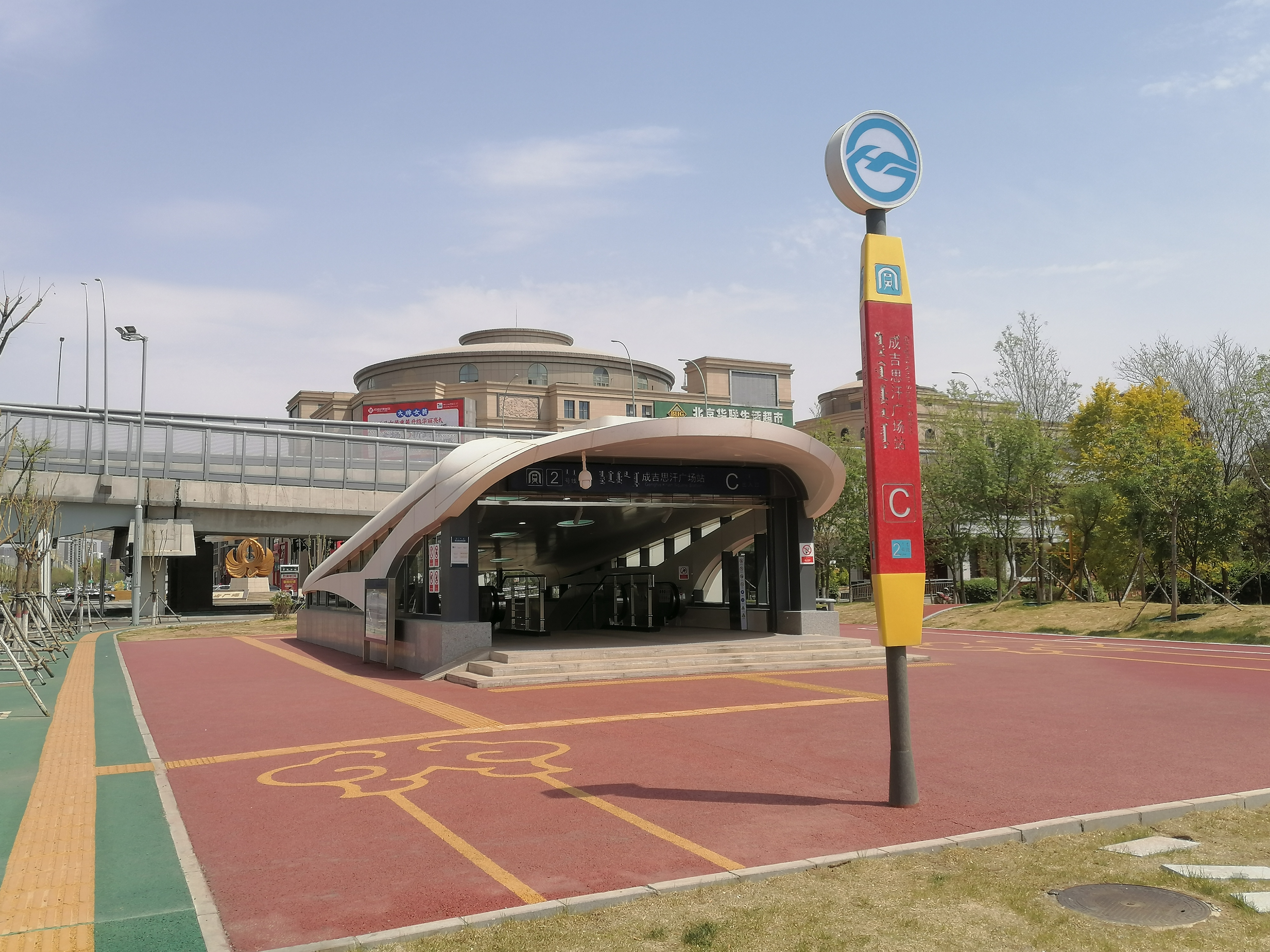
- ᠴᠢᠩᠭᠢᠰ ᠬᠠᠭᠠᠨ ᠲᠠᠯᠠᠪᠠᠢ

General information
- Location: Xincheng District, Hohhot, Inner Mongolia, China
- Coordinates: 40°51′22″N 111°40′11″E
- Line: Line 2

History
- Opened: 1 October 2020; 5 years ago

Services
Preceding station	Hohhot Metro	Following station
Haoqinying towards Talidonglu	Line 2	Inner Mongolia Gymnasium towards A'ershanlu
Location

Genghis Khan Square Station (Chinese: 成吉思汗广场站) is a station on Line 2 of the Hohhot Metro. It opened on 1 October 2020.
