= Daxuexijie station =

Train station

Daxuexijie 大学西街站
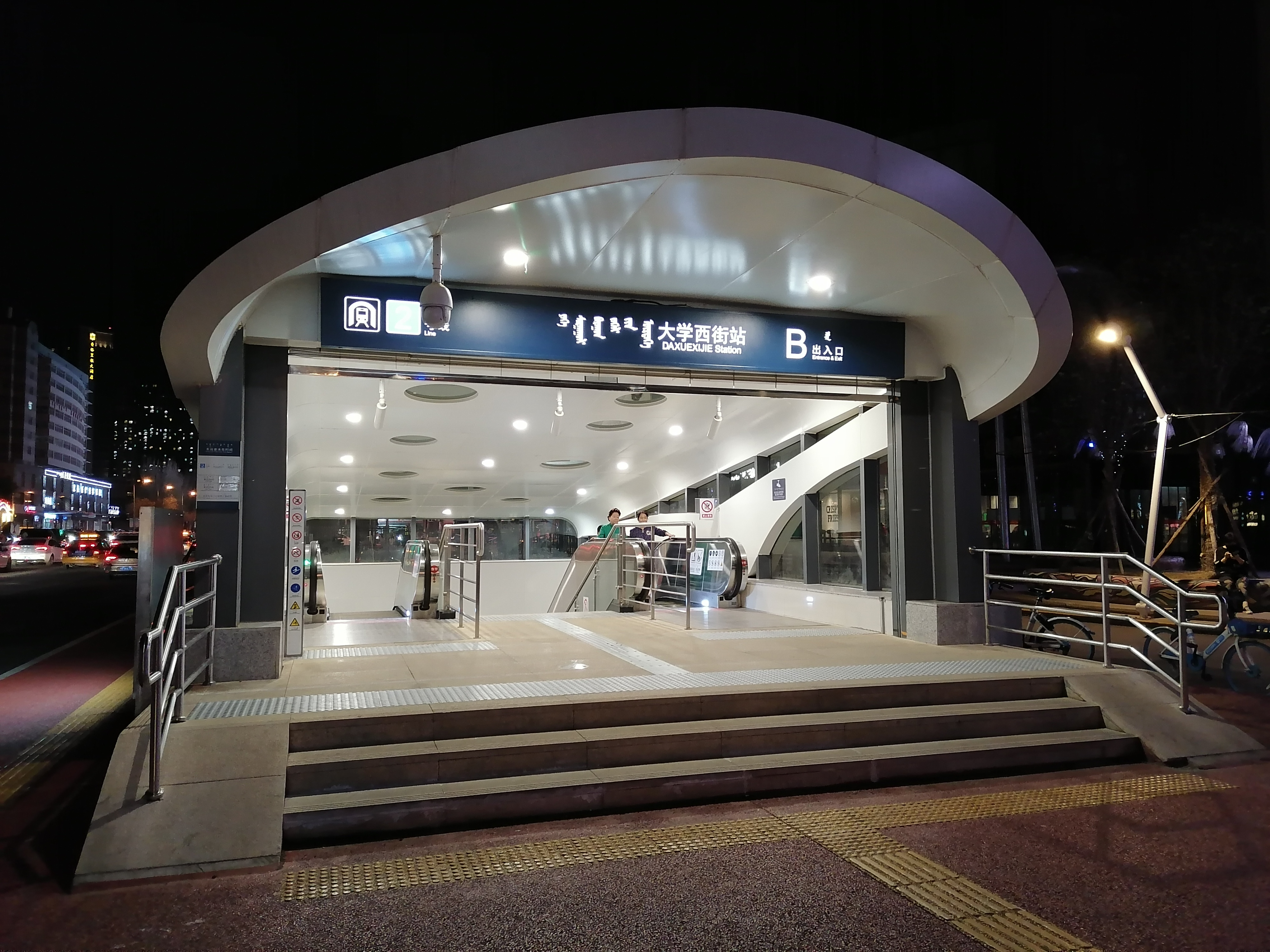
- ᠶᠡᠬᠡ ᠰᠤᠷᠭᠠᠭᠤᠯᠢ ᠪᠠᠷᠠᠭᠤᠨ ᠵᠡᠭᠡᠯᠢ

General information
- Location: Saihan District, Hohhot, Inner Mongolia, China
- Coordinates: 40.8045°N 111.669°E
- Line: Line 2

History
- Opened: 1 October 2020; 5 years ago

Services
| Preceding station | Hohhot Metro | Following station |
|---|---|---|
| Zhongshanlu towards Talidonglu | Line 2 | Nuohemule towards A'ershanlu |
Location

Daxuexijie Station (Chinese: 大学西街站) is a station on Line 2 of the Hohhot Metro. It opened on 1 October 2020.

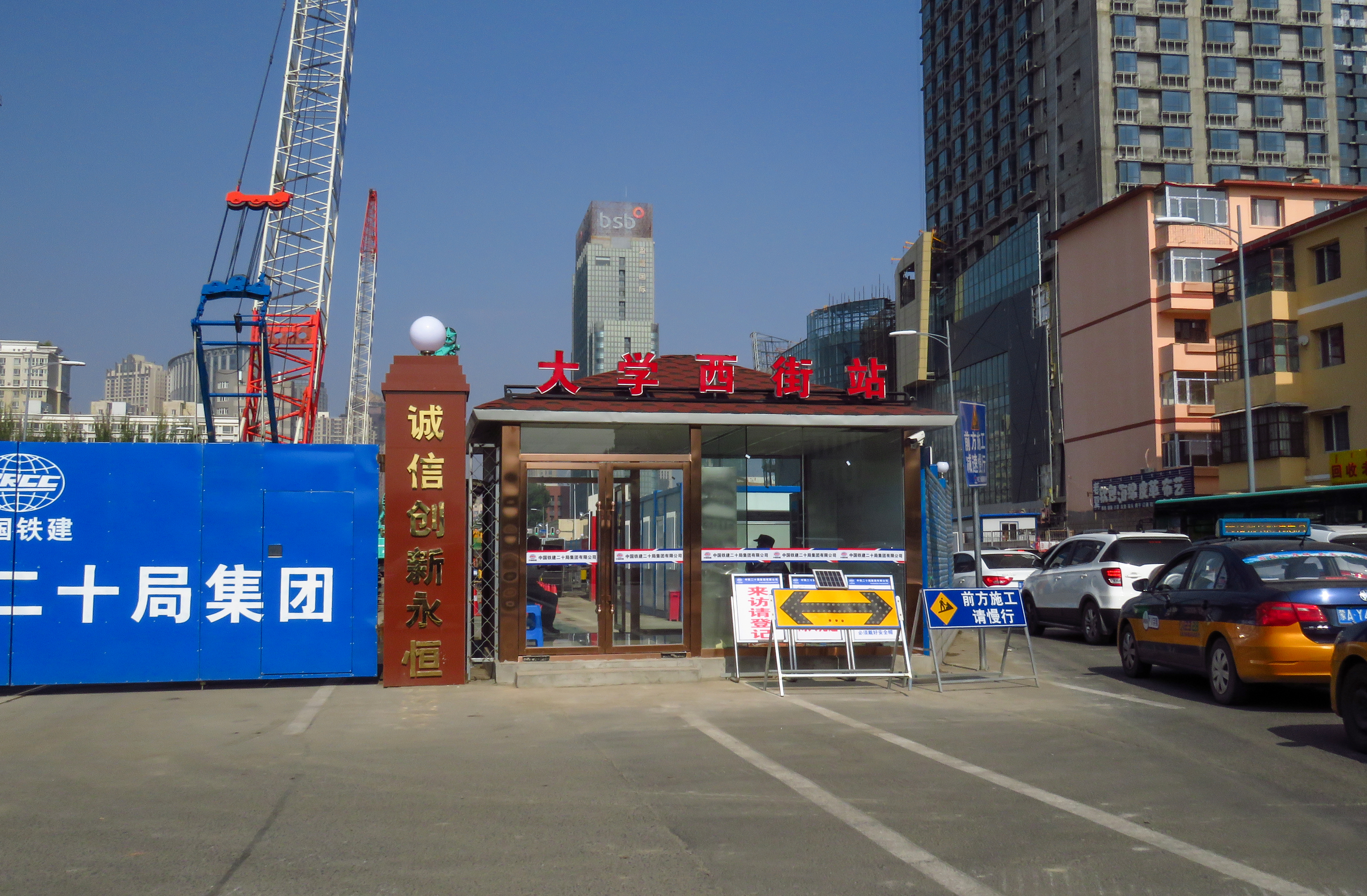
Construction site of Daxuexijie Station
