= Xindian station (Hohhot Metro) =

Metro station in Hohhot, China

Xindian 新店站
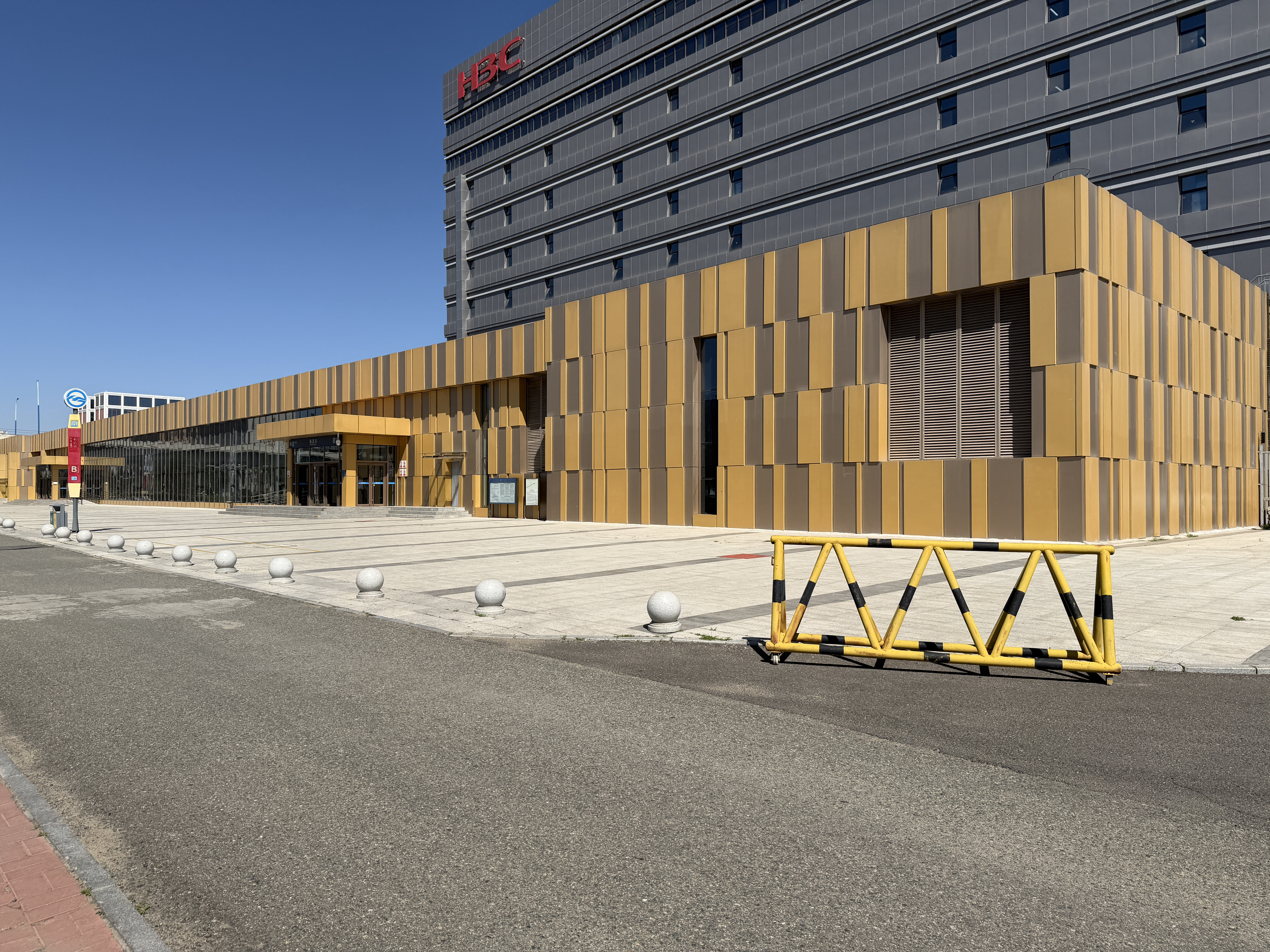
- The Station Building
- ᠰᠢᠨ ᠳ᠋ᠢᠶᠠᠨ

General information
- Location: Xincheng District, Hohhot, Inner Mongolia, China
- Coordinates: 40.8659°N 111.7589°E
- Line: Line 2

History
- Opened: 1 October 2020; 5 years ago

Services
Preceding station	Hohhot Metro	Following station
Talidonglu Terminus	Line 2	Baihelu towards A'ershanlu
Location

Xindian Station (Chinese: 新店站) is a station on Line 2 of the Hohhot Metro. It opened on 1 October 2020.
