= Lamaying station =

Metro station in Hohhot, China

Lamaying 喇嘛营站
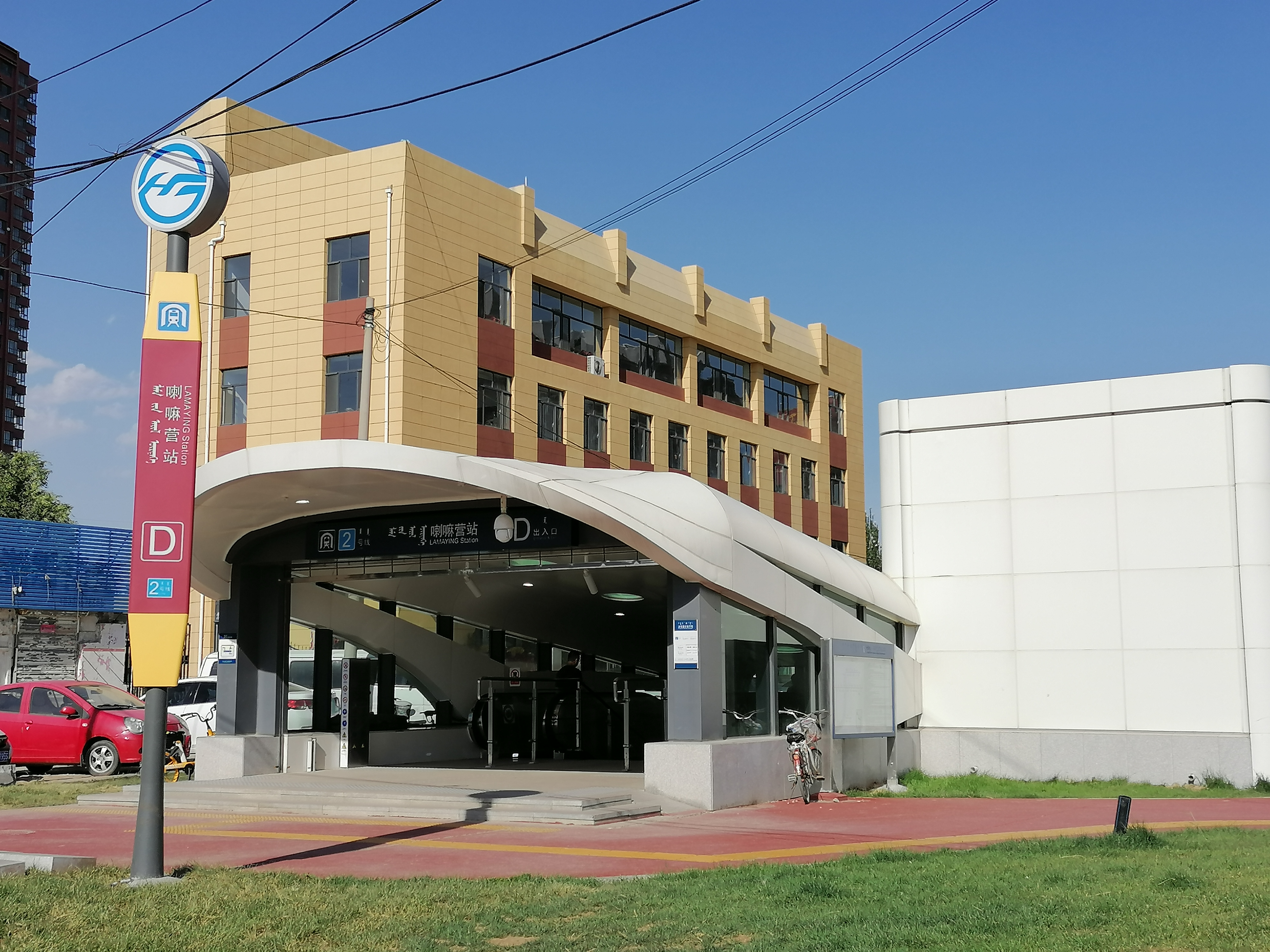
- ᠯᠠᠮᠠ ᠶᠢᠨ ᠠᠢᠯ

General information
- Location: Saihan District, Hohhot, Inner Mongolia, China
- Coordinates: 40.7542°N 111.7243°E
- Line: Line 2

History
- Opened: 1 October 2020; 5 years ago

Services
Preceding station	Hohhot Metro	Following station
Shuaijiaying towards Talidonglu	Line 2	A'ershanlu Terminus
Location

Lamaying Station (Chinese: 喇嘛营站) is a station on Line 2 of the Hohhot Metro. It opened on 1 October 2020.
