= Nuohemule station =

Metro station in Hohhot, China

Nuohemule 诺和木勒站
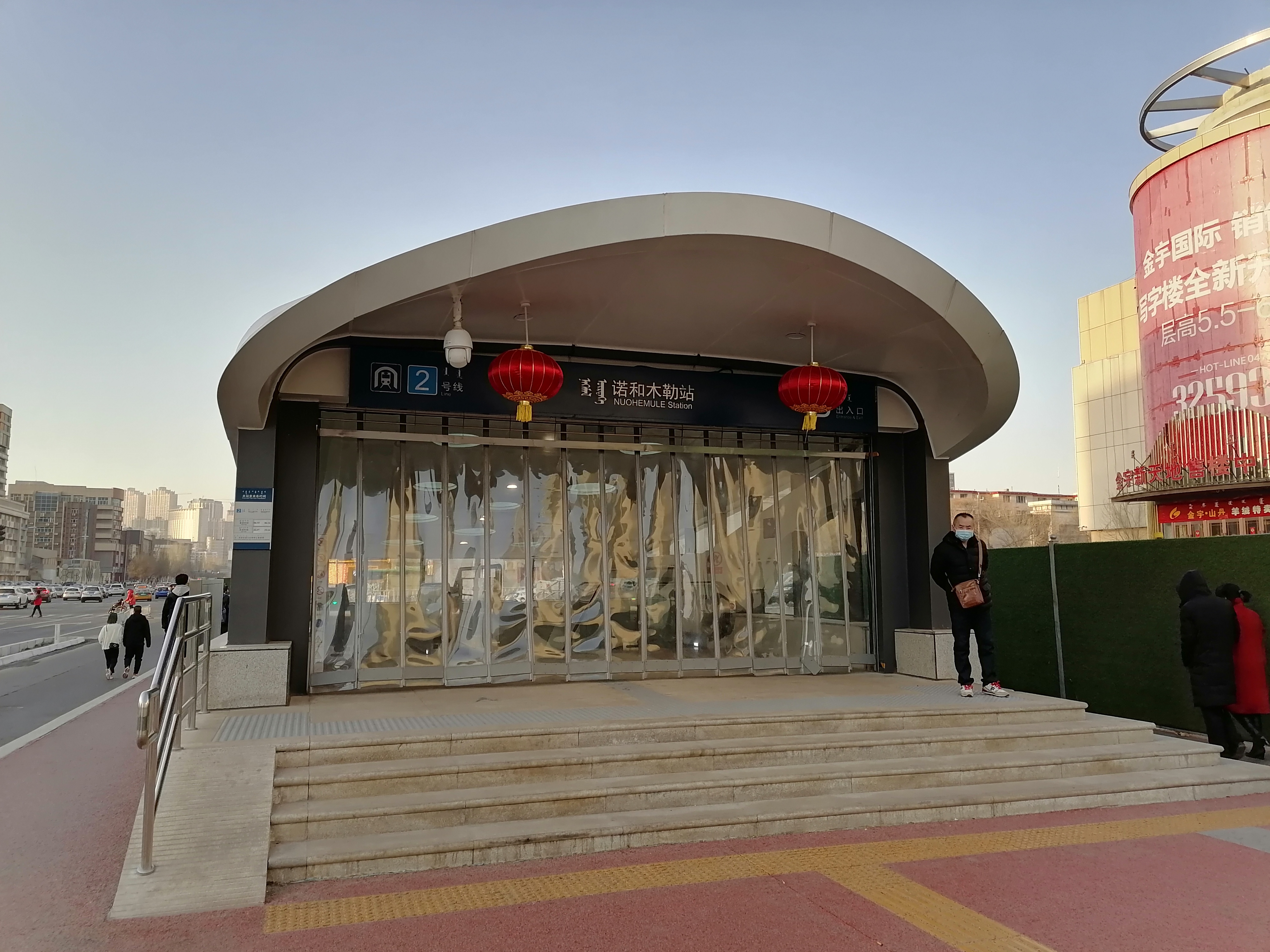
- ᠨᠡᠬᠮᠡᠯ

General information
- Location: Saihan District, Hohhot, Inner Mongolia, China
- Coordinates: 40.7971°N 111.6728°E
- Line: Line 2

History
- Opened: 1 October 2020; 5 years ago

Services
Preceding station	Hohhot Metro	Following station
Daxuexijie towards Talidonglu	Line 2	Shuishang Park towards A'ershanlu
Location

Nuohemule Station (Chinese: 诺和木勒站) is a station on Line 2 of the Hohhot Metro. It opened on 1 October 2020.
