= Zhongshanlu station (Hohhot Metro) =

Train station

Zhongshanlu 中山路站
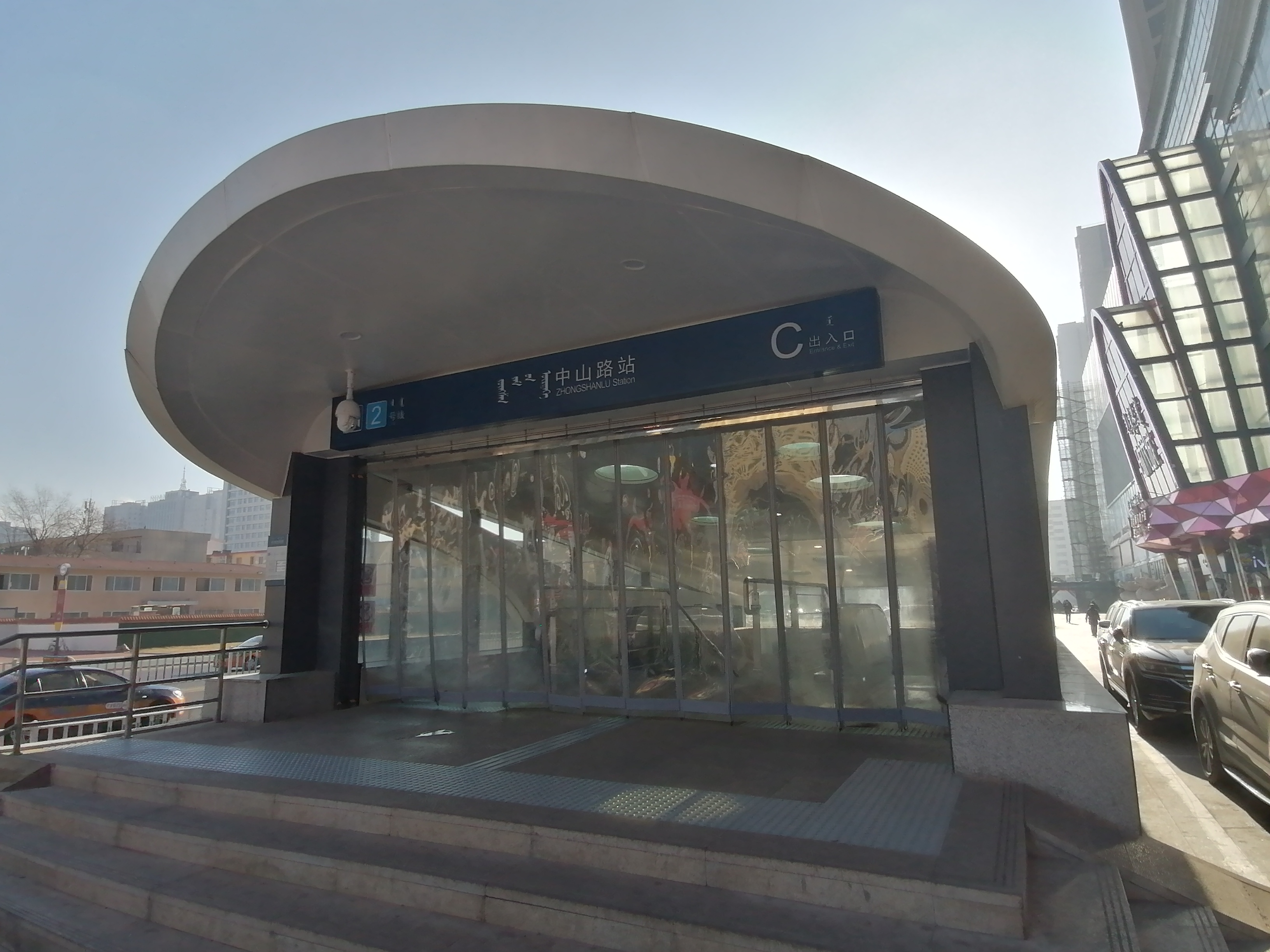
- ᠪᠠᠢ ᠾᠧ ᠵᠠᠮ

General information
- Location: Huimin District, Hohhot, Inner Mongolia, China
- Coordinates: 40.8139°N 111.6641°E
- Line: Line 2

History
- Opened: 1 October 2020; 5 years ago

Services
Preceding station	Hohhot Metro	Following station
Xinhua Square towards Talidonglu	Line 2	Daxuexijie towards A'ershanlu
Location

Zhongshanlu Station (Chinese: 中山路站) is a station on Line 2 of the Hohhot Metro. It opened on 1 October 2020.
