= Shuishang Park station =

Train station

Shuishang Park 水上公园站
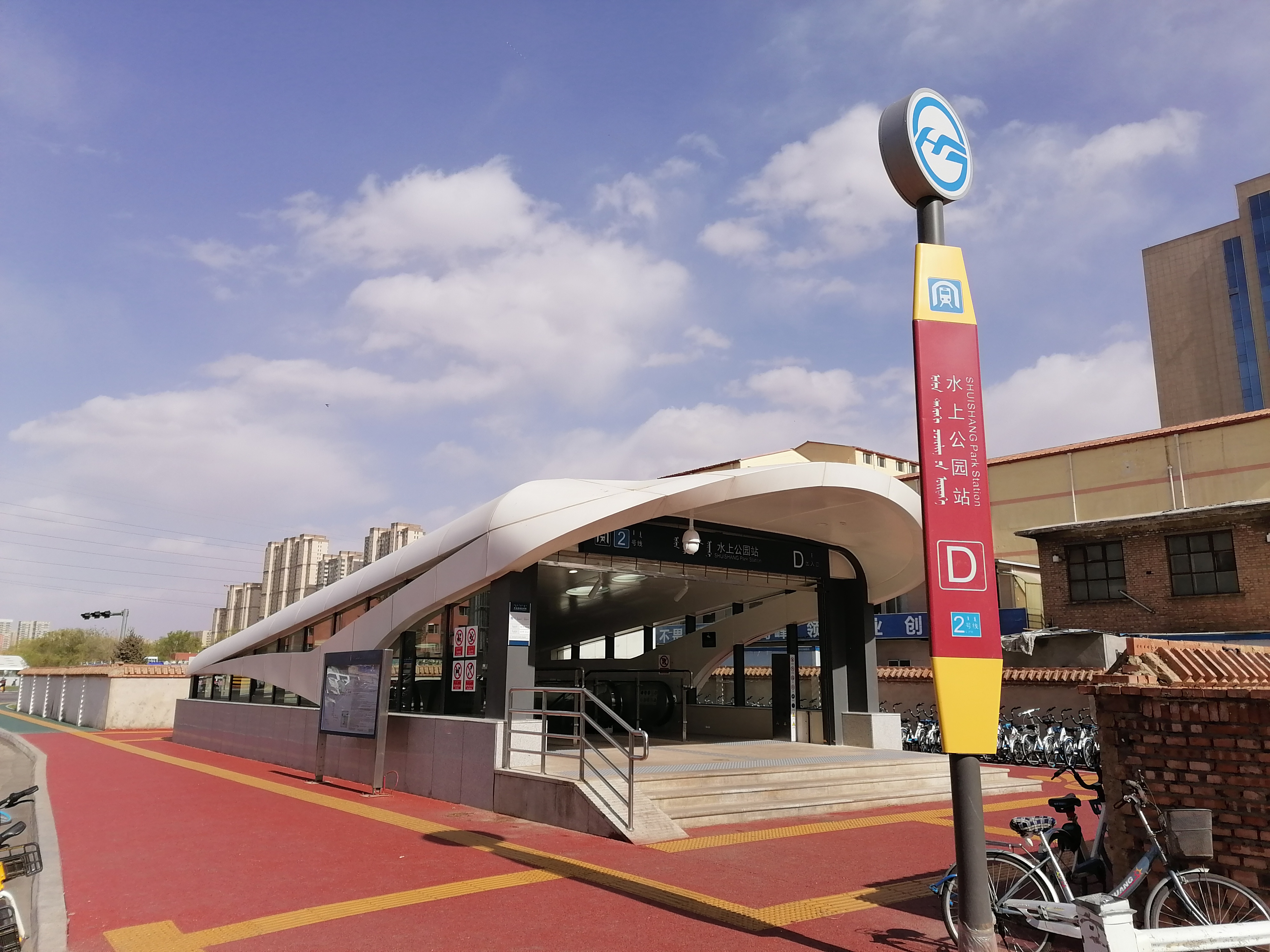
- ᠰᠢᠨ ᠳ᠋ᠢᠶᠠᠨ

General information
- Location: Saihan District, Hohhot, Inner Mongolia, China
- Coordinates: 40.7850°N 111.6745°E
- Line: Line 2

History
- Opened: 1 October 2020; 5 years ago

Services
| Preceding station | Hohhot Metro | Following station |
|---|---|---|
| Nuohemule towards Talidonglu | Line 2 | Wuliying towards A'ershanlu |
Location

Shuishang Park Station (Chinese: 水上公园站) is a station on Line 2 of the Hohhot Metro. It opened on 1 October 2020.
