= Xincheng, Hohhot =

Xincheng 新城区 • ᠰᠢᠨ᠎ᠡ ᠬᠣᠲᠠ ᠲᠣᠭᠣᠷᠢᠭ
- District
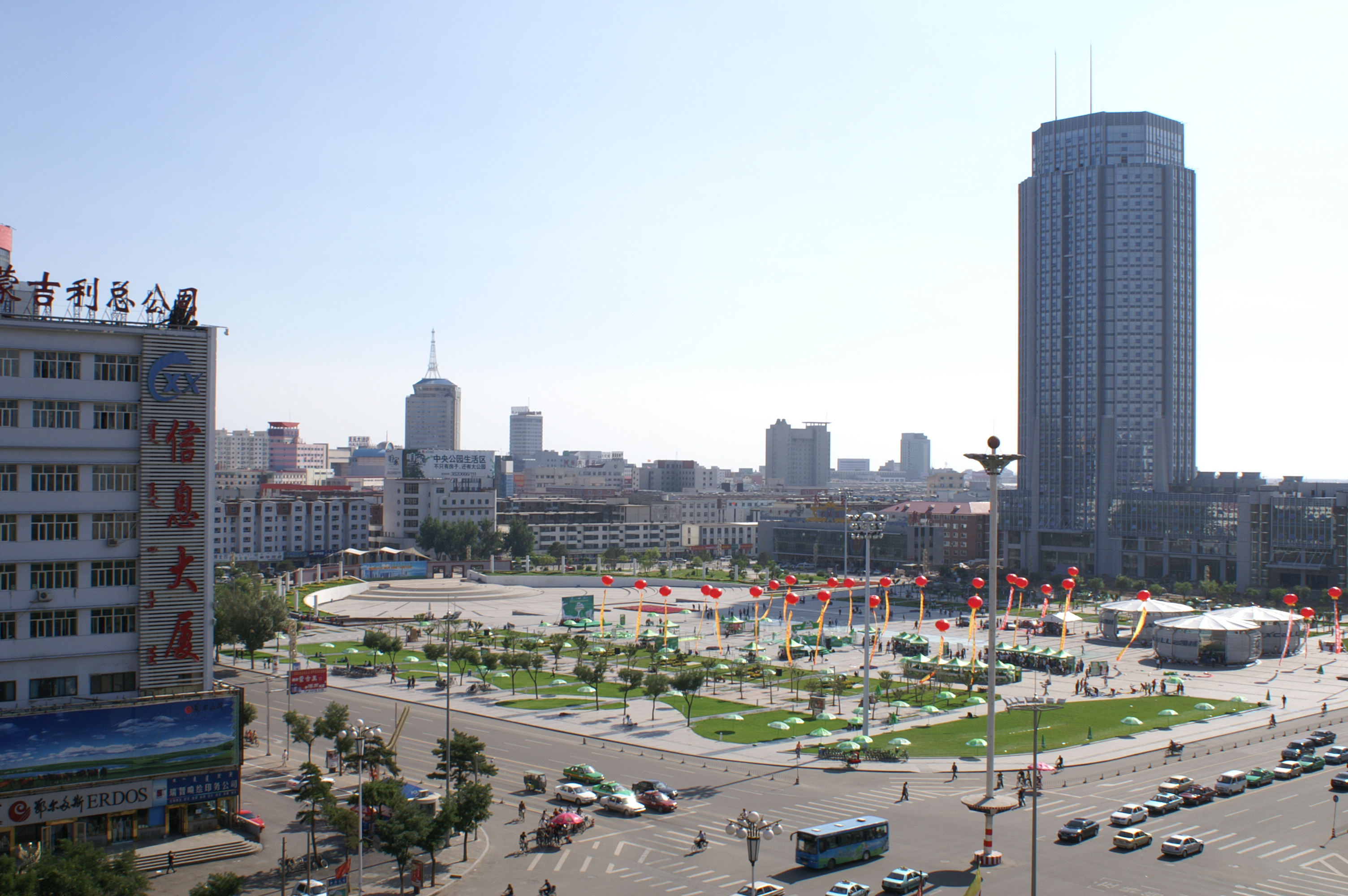
- Xinhua Place

- Location within Inner Mongolia Location within China
- Coordinates: 40°51′N 111°40′E
- Country: China
- Autonomous region: Inner Mongolia
- Prefecture-level city: Hohhot
- District seat: West Street Subdistrict

Area
  - Total: 644.4 km^{2} (248.8 sq mi)
- Elevation: 1,047 m (3,435 ft)

Population (2020)
  - Total: 699,672
  - Density: 1,086/km^{2} (2,812/sq mi)
- Time zone: UTC+8 (China Standard)
- Website: www.xinchengqu.gov.cn

Xincheng, Hohhot

Chinese name
- Simplified Chinese: 新城区
- Traditional Chinese: 新城區
Transcriptions
Standard Mandarin
- Hanyu Pinyin: Xīnchéng Qū
Yue: Cantonese
- Jyutping: san^{1}sing^{4} keoi^{1}

Mongolian name
- Mongolian Cyrillic: Шинэ хот дугараг
- Mongolian script: ᠰᠢᠨ᠎ᠡ ᠬᠣᠲᠠ ᠲᠣᠭᠣᠷᠢᠭ
Transcriptions
- SASM/GNC: Sin-e Qota toɣoriɣ

Xincheng District (Mongolian: ᠰᠢᠨ᠎ᠡ ᠬᠣᠲᠠ ᠲᠣᠭᠣᠷᠢᠭ; Chinese: 新城区) is one of four districts of the prefecture-level city of Hohhot, the capital of Inner Mongolia Autonomous Region, China. It is located in the northeast of central Hohhot, with Saihan District to its south, Huimin District to its west, Wuchuan County to its north, and Zhuozi County of Ulanqab to its east. The District spans 700 square kilometers and has 699,672 inhabitants as of the 2020 census.

== Subdivisions ==
Huimin District is made up of 7 subdistricts and 1 town.

Name	Simplified Chinese	Hanyu Pinyin	Mongolian (Hudum Script)	Mongolian (Cyrillic)	Administrative division code
Subdistricts
Hailar East Road Subdistrict	海拉尔东路街道	Hǎilā'ěrdōnglù Jiēdào	ᠬᠠᠢᠯᠠᠷ ᠵᠡᠭᠦᠨ ᠵᠠᠮ ᠤᠨ ᠵᠡᠭᠡᠯᠢ ᠭᠤᠳᠤᠮᠵᠢ	Хайлаар зүүн замын зээл гудамж	150102001
Xilin North Road Subdistrict	锡林北路街道	Xīlínběilù Jiēdào	ᠰᠢᠯᠢᠨ ᠬᠣᠢᠲᠤ ᠵᠠᠮ ᠤᠨ ᠵᠡᠭᠡᠯᠢ ᠭᠤᠳᠤᠮᠵᠢ	Шилэн хойт замын зээл гудамж	150102002
Zhongshan East Road Subdistrict	中山东路街道	Zhōngshāndōnglù Jiēdào	ᠵᠦᠩ ᠱᠠᠨ ᠵᠡᠭᠦᠨ ᠵᠠᠮ ᠤᠨ ᠵᠡᠭᠡᠯᠢ ᠭᠤᠳᠤᠮᠵᠢ	Жүн шин зүүн замын зээл гудамж	150102003
East Street Subdistrict	东街街道	Dōngjiē Jiēdào	ᠵᠡᠭᠦᠨ ᠵᠡᠭᠡᠯᠢ ᠶᠢᠨ ᠵᠡᠭᠡᠯᠢ ᠭᠤᠳᠤᠮᠵᠢ	Зүүн зээлийн зээл гудамж	150102004
West Street Subdistrict	西街街道	Xījiē Jiēdào	ᠪᠠᠷᠠᠭᠤᠨ ᠵᠡᠭᠡᠯᠢ ᠶᠢᠨ ᠵᠡᠭᠡᠯᠢ ᠭᠤᠳᠤᠮᠵᠢ	Баруун зээлийн зээл гудамж	150102005
Dongfeng Road Subdistrict	东风路街道	Dōngfēnglù Jiēdào	ᠳ᠋ᠦᠩ ᠹᠧᠩ ᠵᠠᠮ ᠤᠨ ᠵᠡᠭᠡᠯᠢ ᠭᠤᠳᠤᠮᠵᠢ	Дүн фен замын зээл гудамж	150102006
Yingxin Road Subdistrict	迎新路街道	Yíngxīnlù Jiēdào	ᠶᠢᠩ ᠰᠢᠨ ᠵᠠᠮ ᠤᠨ ᠵᠡᠭᠡᠯᠢ ᠭᠤᠳᠤᠮᠵᠢ	Ин шин замын зээл гудамж	150102007
Genghis Khan Avenue Subdistrict	成吉思汗大街街道	Chéngjísīhán Dàjiē Jiēdào	ᠴᠢᠩᠭᠢᠰ ᠬᠠᠭᠠᠨ ᠶᠡᠬᠡ ᠵᠡᠭᠡᠯᠢ ᠶᠢᠨ ᠵᠡᠭᠡᠯᠢ ᠭᠤᠳᠤᠮᠵᠢ	Чингис хаан их зээлийн зээл гудамж	150102008
Town
Bor Huxu Town	保合少镇	Bǎohéshǎo Zhèn	ᠪᠣᠷᠣ ᠬᠣᠰᠢᠭᠤ ᠪᠠᠯᠭᠠᠰᠤ	Бор хошуу балгас	150102101

== Transport ==
=== Railway stations ===
Xincheng District houses Hohhot's two major railway stations, with the older Hohhot railway station of the Beijing–Baotou railway, first built in 1921, located in the west of the district, and the newer Hohhot East railway station of the Zhangjiakou–Hohhot high-speed railway, first built in 2010, located in the east.

=== Metro ===
Xincheng is currently served by two lines and 24 stations of the Hohhot Metro.

- 1 - Xinhua Square 2 , People's Hall, Jiangjunyashu, Arts College, Dongyinglu, Inner Mongolia Exhibition Hall, Inner Mongolia Museum, City Government, Hohhot East railway station NDC
- 2 - Talidonglu, Xindian, Baihelu, Beishan Park, Sichouzhiludadao, Yijiacun, Genghis Khan Park, Haoqinying, Genghis Khan Square, Inner Mongolia Gymnasium, Hohhot Stadium, Gongzhufu, Hohhot railway station HHC, Xinhua Square 1 , Zhongshanlu
