= Hohhot City Stadium =

Football stadium in Hohhot, Inner Mongolia, China

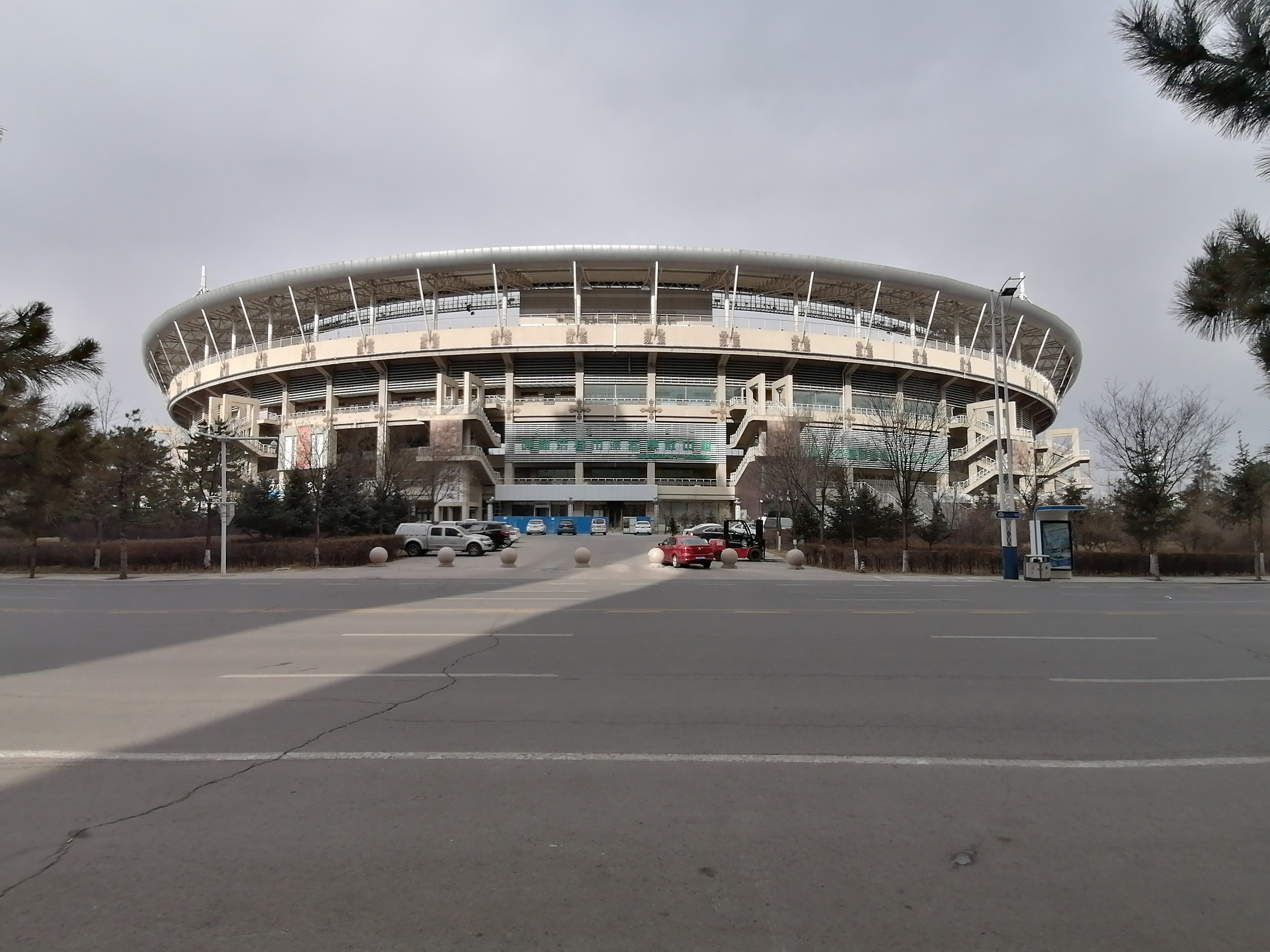
- Interactive map of Hohhot City Stadium
- Location: Hohhot, Inner Mongolia, China
- Coordinates: 40°51′4.5″N 111°39′1.5″E
- Capacity: 51,632
- Surface: Grass
- Public transit: 2 at Hohhot Stadium

Construction
- Opened: 6 July 2007

Tenants
- Nei Mongol Zhongyou (2017–2020); China national football team (selected matches)

The Hohhot City Stadium (Simplified Chinese: 呼和浩特市体育场) is a multi-use stadium in Hohhot, China. It is currently used mostly for football matches of Inner Mongolia Zhongyou F.C. This stadium holds 51,632 people. This stadium was built from May 2005.
