= Hohhot railway station =

Railway station in Inner Mongolia, China

Hohhot 呼和浩特
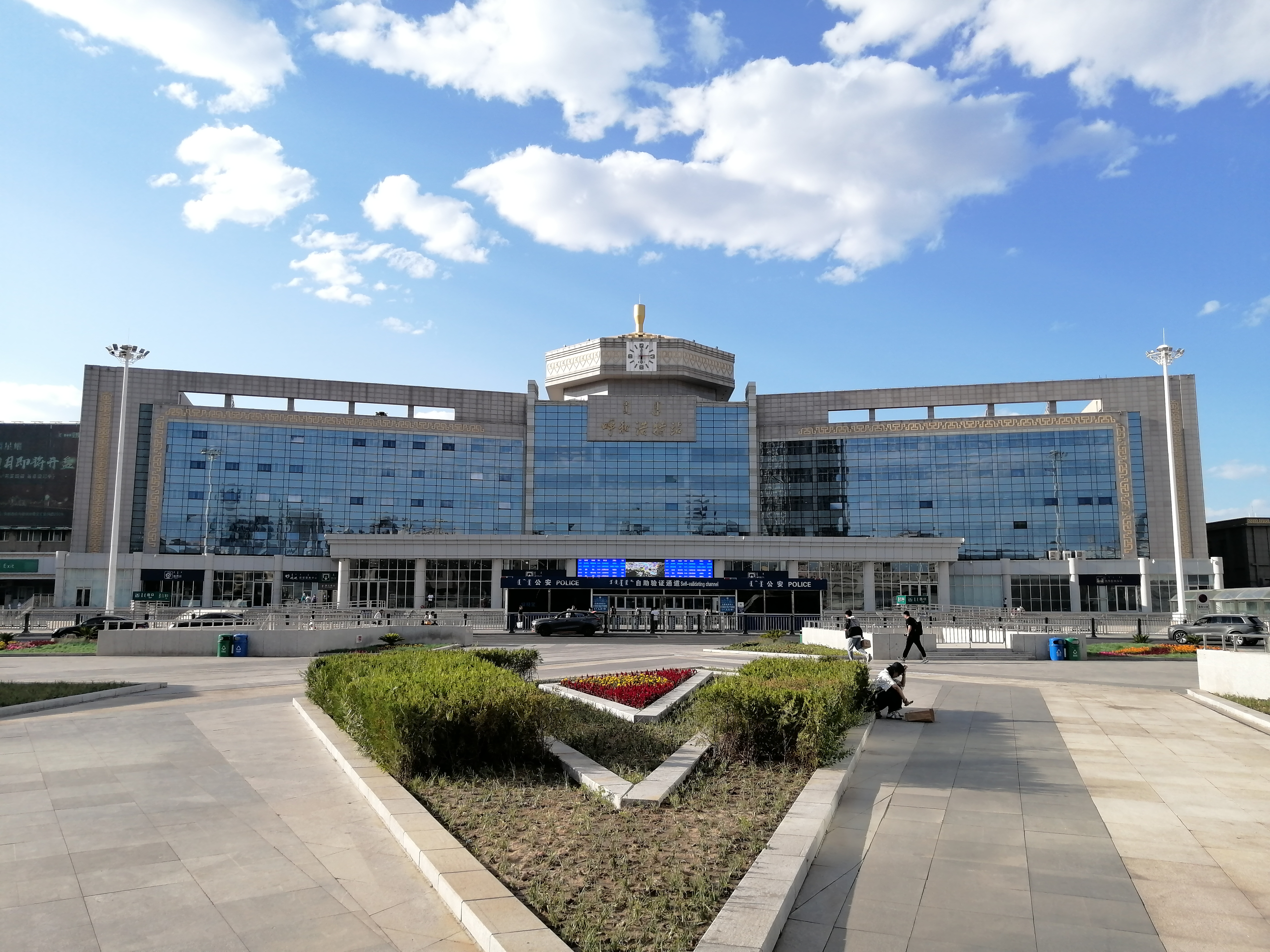
- Hohhot railway station

General information
- Other names: Hohhot Passenger Station
- Location: Chezhan Lu, Xincheng, Hohhot, Inner Mongolia; China
- Coordinates: 40°49′47″N 111°39′33″E
- Operated by: Hohhot Railway Bureau, China Railway Corporation
- Line(s): Jingbao Railway
- Platforms: 3
- Connections: Bus terminal

Other information
- Station code: 12581 (TMIS code); HHC (Telegram code); HHT (Pinyin code)

History
- Opened: 1921

Hohhot railway station, or Huhehaote railway station (Chinese: 呼和浩特站; pinyin: Hūhéhàotè zhàn) is a railway station on the Jingbao Railway line. The station is located in Hohhot, Inner Mongolia, China. It is downtown, next to the Express Bus Station.

== History ==
The station opened in April 1921, expanding the Jingbao Line from Zhangjiakou to Hohhot. The ceremony marking the opening of the line was held in May of the same year. The station was initially referred to by older names for Hohhot, including Suiyuan (Chinese: 绥远) or Guisui (Chinese: 归绥). The name was changed to Hohhot Station in 1954. In 1959, work started on the western site (Chinese: 西场) of Hohhot Station. The western site went into use in 1965 and, in 1966, all goods trains were diverted here. It became common practice to refer to the main site as Hohhot Passenger Station (Chinese: 呼和浩特客站).

In 1981, a formal paper was published by the Hohhot Rail Authority declaring that the station was a level one transit station.

== Metro station ==
Line 2 of Hohhot Metro, which was opened on 1 October 2020, serves Hohhot railway station.

== Development ==
A new station called Hohhot East railway station opened in 2008. Both stations service passenger trains, with Hohhot East services heading west to Yinchuan, Lanzhou, and Chengdu. Trains from Hohhot railway station continue to service the east, including Beijing, Shanghai, Guangzhou, Shenyang, and Wuhan. The trains from Hohhot East railway station also pass through the original Hohhot railway station.

== See also ==
- List of stations on Jingbao railway
- Hohhot Metro
