= Line 2 (Hohhot Metro) =

Metro line in Hohhot, China

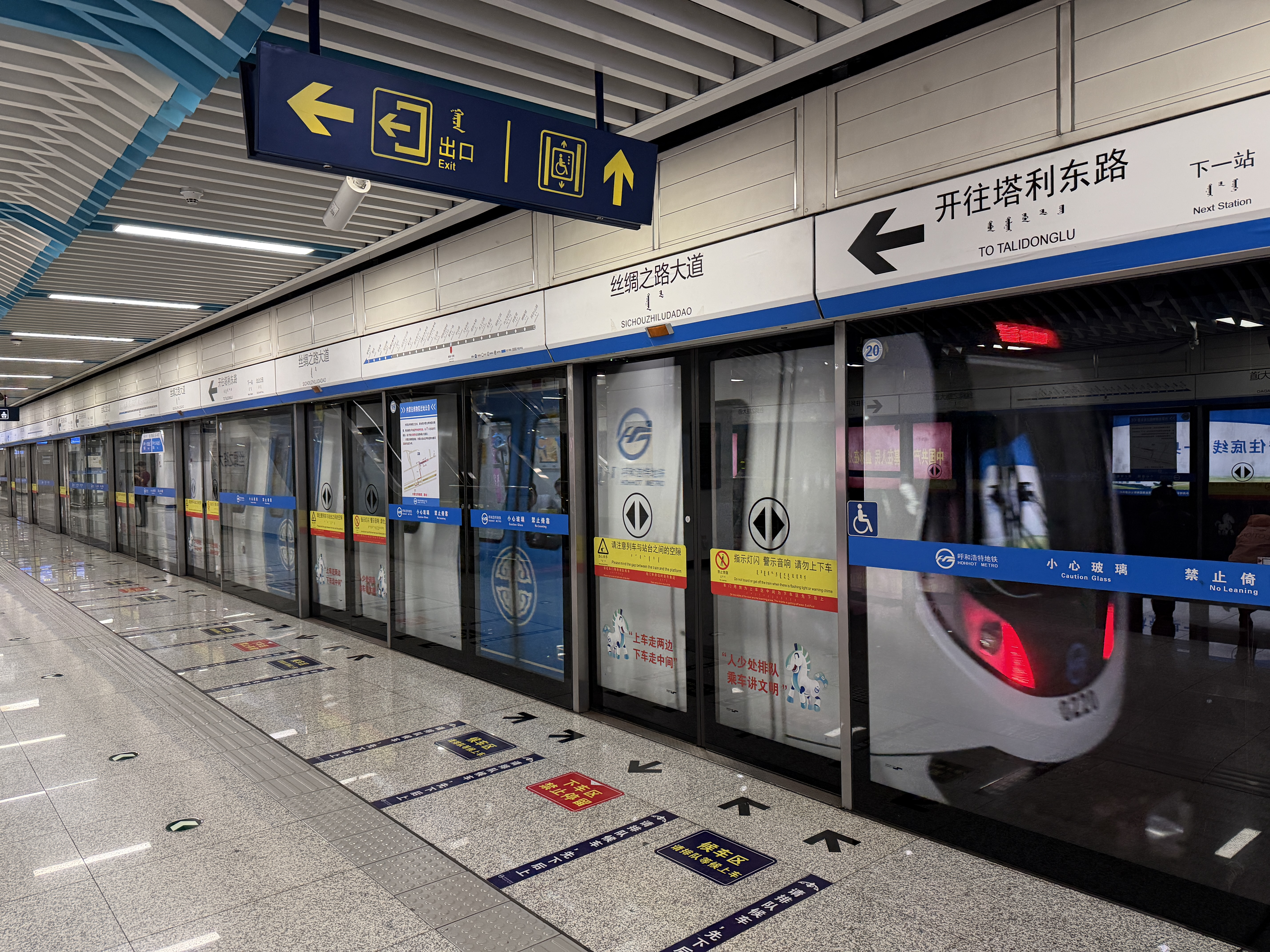
- Line 2 train at Sichouzhiludadao Station

Overview
- Status: In operation
- Locale: Hohhot, Inner Mongolia, China
- Termini: Talidonglu; A'ershanlu
- Stations: 24

Service
- Type: Rapid transit
- System: Hohhot Metro
- Rolling stock: 6-car Type B

History
- Opened: 1 October 2020; 5 years ago

Technical
- Line length: 27.32 km (17.0 mi)
- Character: Underground
- Track gauge: 1,435 mm (4 ft 8 1/2 in)

Line 2 (Hohhot Metro)

Chinese name
- Simplified Chinese: 呼和浩特地铁2号线
- Traditional Chinese: 呼和浩特地鐵2號線
Transcriptions
Standard Mandarin
- Hanyu Pinyin: Hūhéhàotè Dìtiě Èr Hào Xiàn

Mongolian name
- Mongolian Cyrillic: Хөххотийн Метрийн 2 Номерт Шугам
- Mongolian script: ᠬᠦᠬᠡᠬᠤᠳᠠ ᠶᠢᠨ ᠮᠧᠲ᠋ᠷᠣ᠋ ᠶᠢᠨ ᠒ ᠨᠤᠮᠧᠷᠳᠤ ᠱᠤᠭᠤᠮ

Line 2 of Hohhot Metro is a rapid transit line in Hohhot, Inner Mongolia, China.

The first phase of Line 2 is 27.32 km (17.0 mi) long. It was opened on 1 October 2020. The color for Line 2 is blue.

== Opening timeline ==
Segment	Commencement	Length	Station(s)	Name
Talidonglu — A'ershanlu	1 October 2020; 5 years ago	27.32 km (17.0 mi)	24	Phase 1

== Stations ==
Station name			Connections	Distance km	Location
English	Chinese	Mongolian	Connections	Distance km	Location
Talidonglu	塔利东路	ᠲᠠᠪᠤᠨ ᠲᠣᠯᠣᠭᠠᠢ ᠵᠡᠭᠦᠨ ᠵᠠᠮ			Xincheng
Xindian	新店	ᠰᠢᠨ ᠳ᠋ᠢᠶᠠᠨ			Xincheng
Baihelu	百合路	ᠪᠠᠢ ᠾᠧ ᠵᠠᠮ			Xincheng
Beishan Park (Note: Was Xincheng Library until 31 October 2023)	北山公园	ᠬᠣᠢᠲᠤ ᠠᠭᠤᠯᠠ ᠴᠡᠴᠡᠷᠯᠵᠭ			Xincheng
Sichouzhiludadao (Note: Was Dongerhuanlu until 31 October 2023)	丝绸之路大道	ᠲᠣᠷᠭᠠᠨ ᠵᠠᠮ			Xincheng
Yijiacun	一家村	ᠭᠠᠭᠴᠠ ᠭᠡᠷ ᠲᠣᠰᠬᠣᠨ			Xincheng
Genghis Khan Park	成吉思汗公园	ᠴᠢᠩᠭᠢᠰ ᠬᠠᠭᠠᠨ ᠴᠡᠴᠡᠷᠯᠢᠭ			Xincheng
Haoqinying	毫沁营	ᠬᠠᠭᠤᠴᠢᠨ ᠠᠢᠯ			Xincheng
Genghis Khan Square	成吉思汗广场	ᠴᠢᠩᠭᠢᠰ ᠬᠠᠭᠠᠨ ᠲᠠᠯᠠᠪᠠᠢ			Xincheng
Inner Mongolia Gymnasium	内蒙古体育馆	ᠥᠪᠥᠷ ᠮᠣᠩᠭᠣᠯ ᠤᠨ ᠲᠠᠮᠢᠷ ᠤᠨ ᠣᠷᠳᠣᠨ			Xincheng
Hohhot Stadium	呼和浩特体育场	ᠬᠥᠬᠡᠬᠣᠲᠠ ᠶᠢᠨ ᠲᠠᠮᠢᠷ ᠤᠨ ᠲᠠᠯᠠᠪᠠᠢ			Xincheng
Gongzhufu	公主府	ᠭᠦᠩᠵᠦ ᠶᠢᠨ ᠣᠷᠳᠣᠨ			Xincheng
Hohhot Railway Station	呼和浩特站	ᠬᠥᠬᠡᠬᠣᠲᠠ ᠶᠢᠨ ᠭᠠᠯᠲᠤ ᠲᠡᠷᠭᠡᠨ ᠦ ᠥᠷᠲᠡᠭᠡ	HHC		Xincheng
Xinhua Square	新华广场	ᠰᠢᠨᠬᠤᠸᠠ ᠲᠠᠯᠠᠪᠠᠢ	1		Huimin/Xincheng
Zhongshanlu	中山路	ᠵᠦᠩᠱᠠᠨ ᠵᠠᠮ			Huimin/Xincheng
Daxuexijie	大学西街	ᠶᠡᠬᠡ ᠰᠤᠷᠭᠠᠭᠤᠯᠢ ᠪᠠᠷᠠᠭᠤᠨ ᠵᠡᠭᠡᠯᠢ			Huimin/Saihan/Yuquan
Nuohemule	诺和木勒	ᠨᠡᠬᠮᠡᠯ			Saihan/Yuquan
Shuishang Park	水上公园	ᠤᠰᠤᠨ ᠳᠡᠭᠡᠷᠡᠬᠢ ᠴᠡᠴᠡᠷᠯᠢᠭ			Saihan/Yuquan
Wuliying	五里营	ᠦ᠋ ᠯᠢ ᠶᠢᠩ			Yuquan
Xilin Park	锡林公园	ᠰᠢᠯᠢ ᠶᠢᠨ ᠴᠡᠴᠡᠷᠯᠢᠭ			Yuquan
Neida Nanxiaoqu	内大南校区	ᠥᠪᠥᠷ ᠮᠣᠩᠭᠣᠯ ᠤᠨ ᠶᠡᠬᠡ ᠰᠤᠷᠭᠠᠭᠤᠯᠢ ᠶᠢᠨ ᠡᠮᠦᠨ᠎ᠡ ᠲᠣᠭᠣᠷᠢᠭ			Yuquan
Shuaijiaying	帅家营	ᠱᠤᠸᠠᠢ ᠣᠪᠣᠭᠲᠤ ᠠᠢᠯ			Saihan
Lamaying	喇嘛营	ᠯᠠᠮᠠ ᠶᠢᠨ ᠠᠢᠯ			Saihan
A'ershanlu	阿尔山路	ᠷᠠᠰᠢᠶᠠᠨ ᠵᠠᠮ			Saihan
