= Talidonglu station =

Train station

Talidonglu 塔利东路站
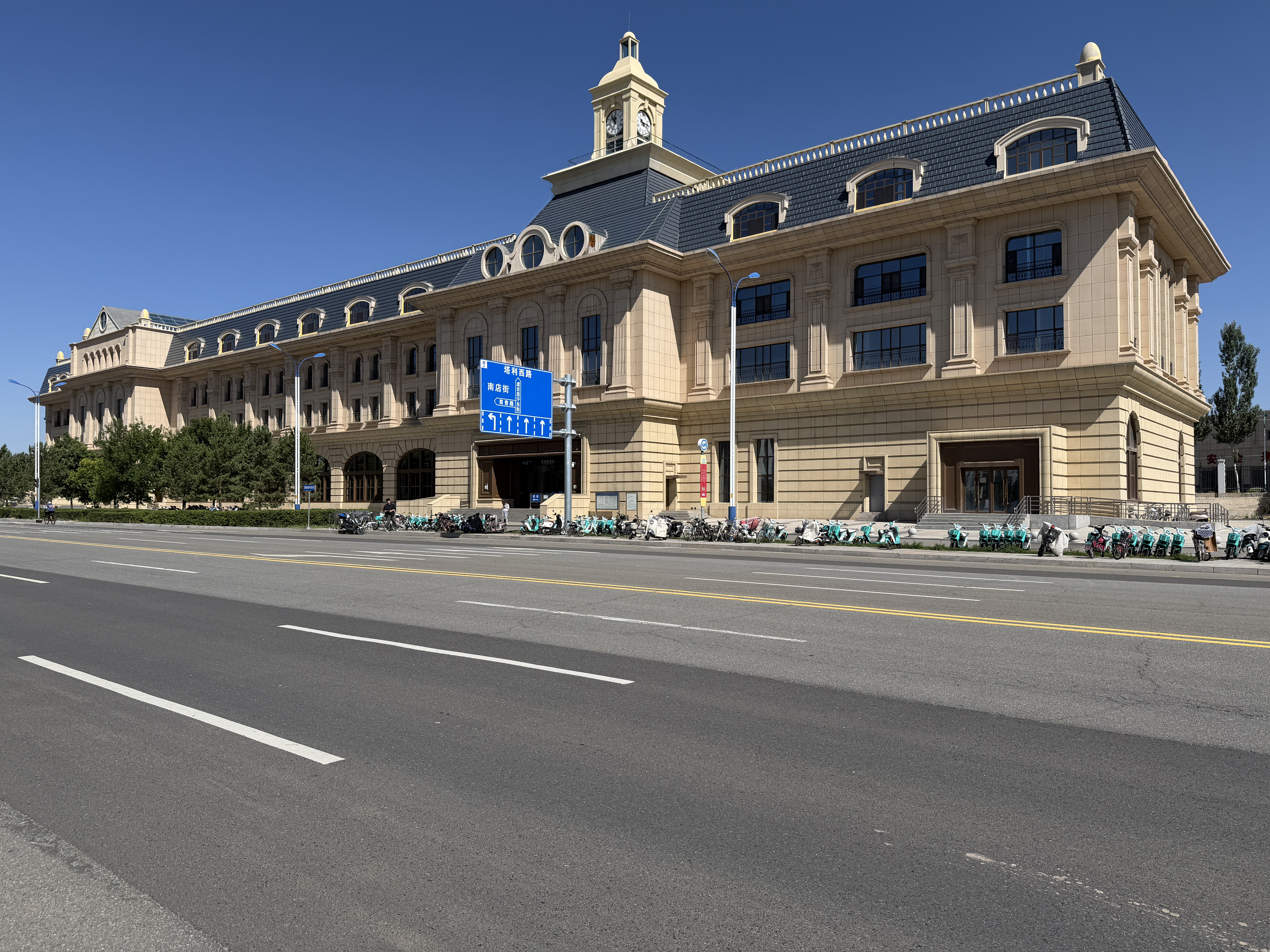
- The Station Building
- ᠲᠠᠪᠤᠨ ᠲᠣᠯᠣᠭᠠᠢ ᠵᠡᠭᠦᠨ ᠵᠠᠮ

General information
- Location: Xincheng District, Hohhot, Inner Mongolia, China
- Coordinates: 40.8680°N 111.7700°E
- Line: Line 2

History
- Opened: 1 October 2020; 5 years ago

Services
| Preceding station | Hohhot Metro | Following station |
|---|---|---|
| Terminus | Line 2 | Xindian towards A'ershanlu |
Location

Talidonglu Station (Chinese: 塔利东路站) is a station on Line 2 of the Hohhot Metro. It opened on 1 October 2020, and is the northern terminus of Hohhot Metro Line 2.
