= A'ershanlu station =

Metro station in Hohhot, China

A'ershanlu 阿尔山路站
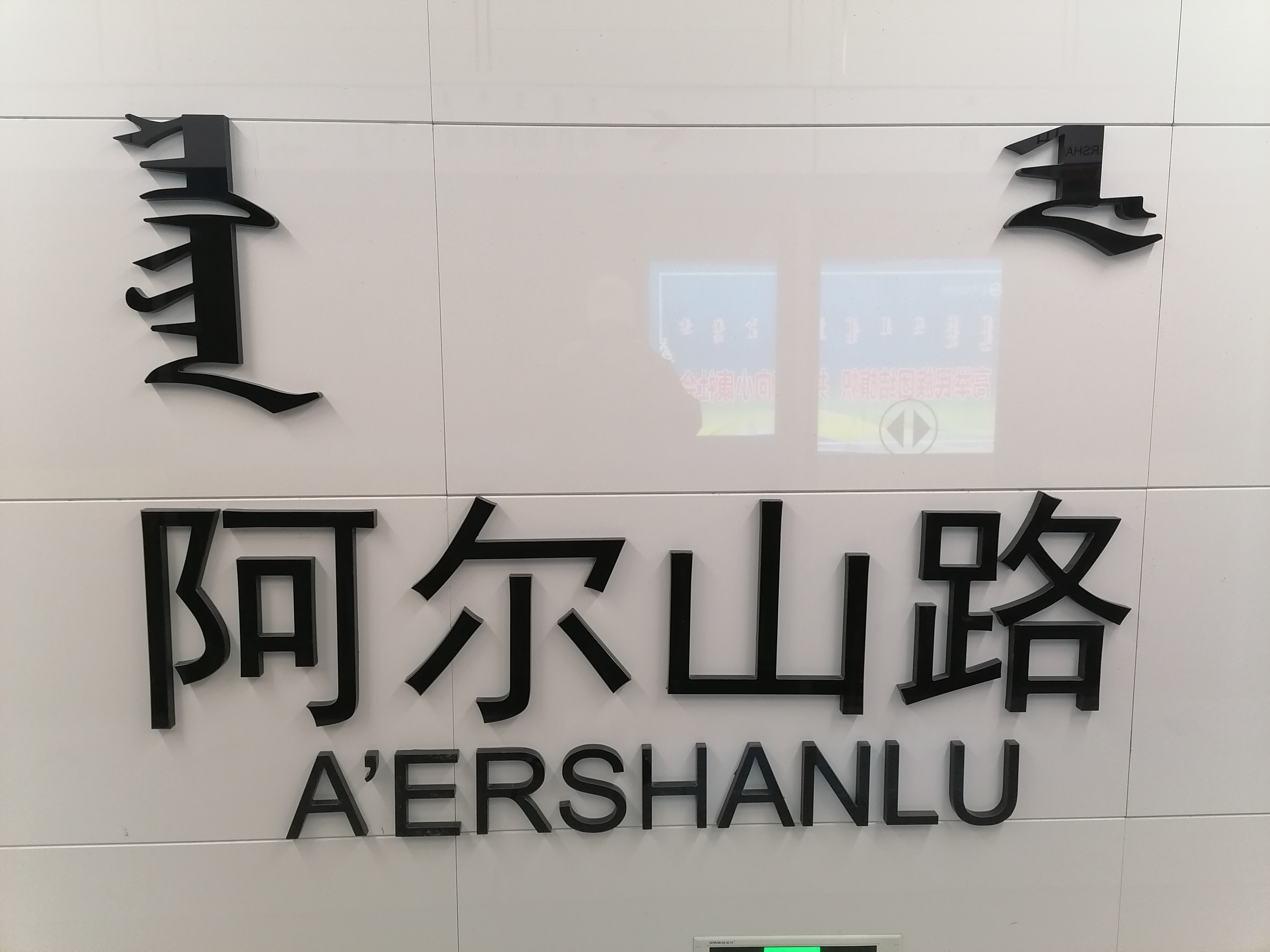
- ᠷᠠᠰᠢᠶᠠᠨ ᠵᠠᠮ

General information
- Location: Saihan District, Hohhot, Inner Mongolia; China
- Coordinates: 40°45′14.8″N 111°44′27.2″E
- Line: Line 2

History
- Opened: 1 October 2020

Services
Preceding station	Hohhot Metro	Following station
Lamaying towards Talidonglu	Line 2	Terminus
Location

A'ershanlu Station (Chinese: 阿尔山路站) is a station on Line 2 of the Hohhot Metro. It opened on 1 October 2020, and is the southern terminus of Line 2.
