= Hohhot Metro =

Metro system in Inner Mongolia, China

Overview
- Locale: Hohhot, Inner Mongolia, China
- Transit type: Rapid transit
- Number of lines: 2
- Number of stations: 44
- Website: http://www.hhhtmetro.com/

Operation
- Began operation: 29 December 2019; 6 years ago

Technical
- System length: 49.0 km (30.4 mi)
System map

Hohhot Metro

Chinese name
- Simplified Chinese: 呼和浩特地铁
- Traditional Chinese: 呼和浩特地鐵
Transcriptions
Standard Mandarin
- Hanyu Pinyin: Hūhéhàotè Dìtiě

Alternative Chinese name
- Simplified Chinese: 呼和浩特轨道交通
- Traditional Chinese: 呼和浩特軌道交通
Transcriptions
Standard Mandarin
- Hanyu Pinyin: Hūhéhàotè Guǐdào Jiāotōng

Mongolian name
- Mongolian Cyrillic: Хөх хотын метро
- Mongolian script: ᠬᠦᠬᠡᠬᠤᠳᠠ ᠶᠢᠨ ᠮᠧᠲ᠋ᠷᠣ᠋
Transcriptions
- SASM/GNC: Kökeqota-jin metoru

Hohhot Metro or Hohhot Rail Transit is a metro system in Hohhot, Inner Mongolia, China. Line 1 opened on 29 December 2019. It is currently the only metro system in China without China T-Union support.

== Lines ==
Line	Terminals (District/Banner)		Commencement	Length km	Stations
1	Yili Health Valley (Tumed Left Banner)	Bayan (Airport) (Saihan)	29 December 2019	21.719	20
2	Talidonglu (Xincheng)	A'ershanlu (Saihan)	1 October 2020	27.32	24

=== Line 1 ===
The first phase of Line 1 is 21.719 km (13.5 mi) long. The color for Line 1 is red.

Line 1 began construction in April 2016 and was opened on 29 December 2019.

=== Line 2 ===
The first phase of Line 2 is 27.32 km (17.0 mi) long. It was opened on 1 October 2020. The color for Line 2 is blue.

== Future development ==
Lines 3, 4, 5 and 6 are under planning.

== See also ==
- Baotou Metro, suspended in 2017
- Rapid transit in China
- List of metro systems
- Urban rail transit in China
