= Inner Mongolia Exhibition Hall station =

Station of Hohhot Metro

Inner Mongolia Exhibition Hall 内蒙古展览馆站
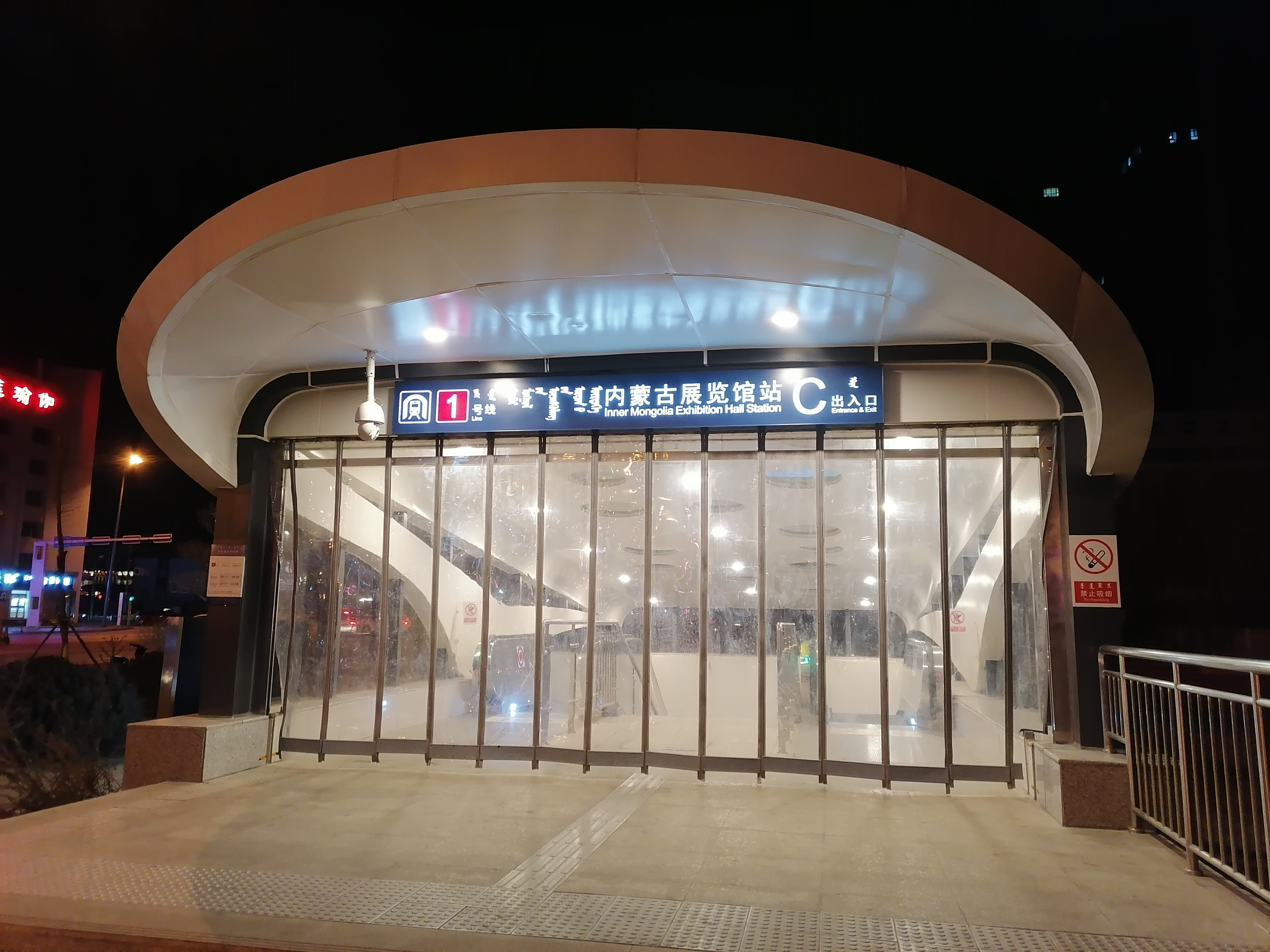
- ᠥᠪᠥᠷ ᠮᠣᠩᠭᠣᠯ ᠤᠨ ᠦᠵᠡᠰᠬᠦᠯᠡᠩ ᠦᠨ ᠣᠷᠳᠣᠨ

General information
- Location: Saihan District, Hohhot, Inner Mongolia, China
- Coordinates: 40.832189°N 111.713426°E
- Line: Line 1

History
- Opened: 29 December 2019; 6 years ago

Services
Preceding station	Hohhot Metro	Following station
Dongyinglu towards Yili Health Valley	Line 1	Inner Mongolia Museum towards Bayan (Airport)
Location

Inner Mongolia Exhibition Hall Station (Chinese: 内蒙古展览馆站) is a station on Line 1 of the Hohhot Metro. It opened on 29 December 2019.
