= Arts College station (Hohhot Metro) =

Station of Hohhot Metro

Arts College 艺术学院站
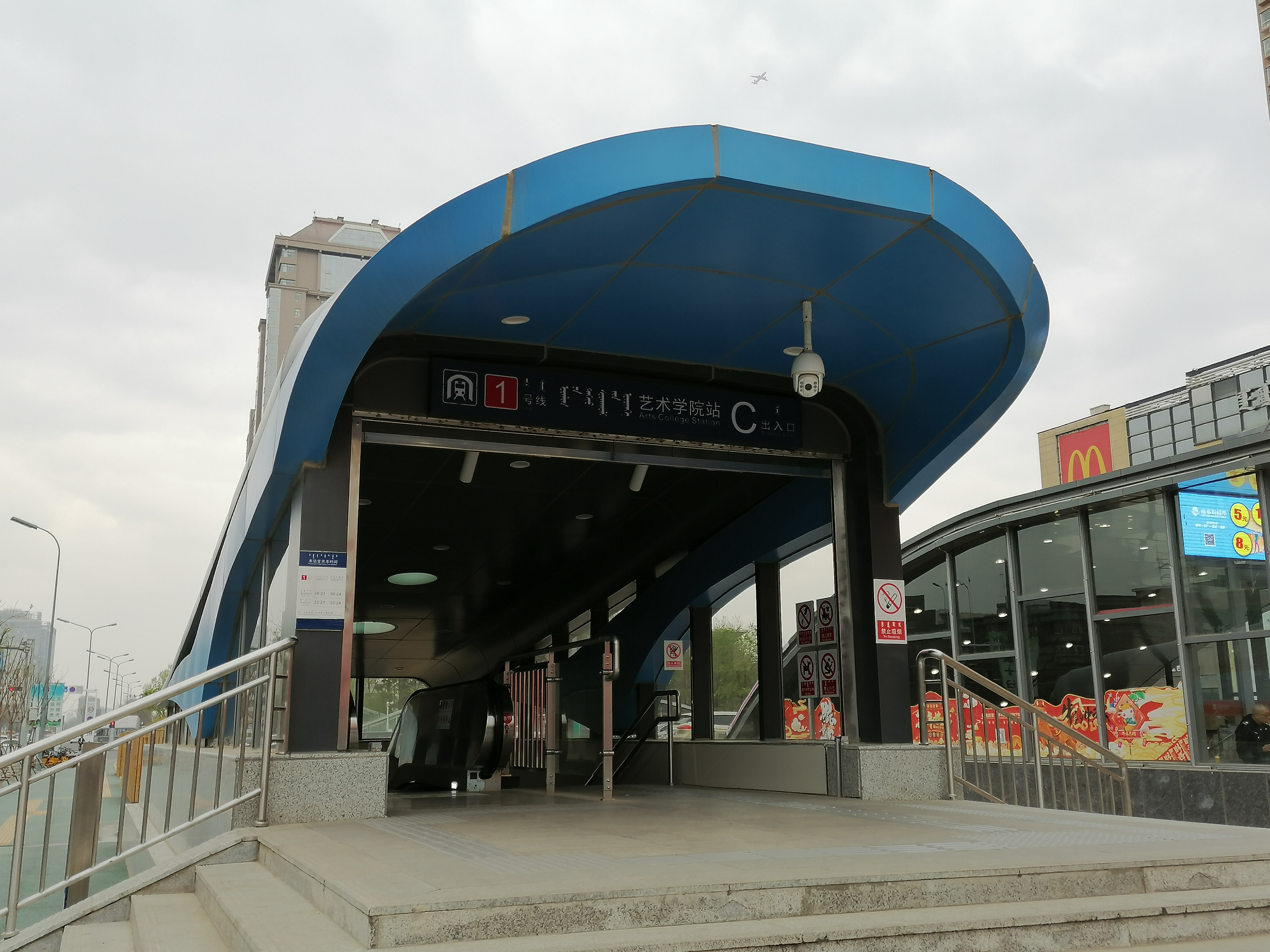
- Exit C of Arts College Station
- ᠤᠷᠠᠯᠢᠭ ᠤᠨ ᠳᠡᠭᠡᠳᠦ ᠰᠤᠷᠭᠠᠭᠤᠯᠢ

General information
- Location: Xincheng District, Hohhot, Inner Mongolia, China
- Coordinates: 40.827619°N 111.693403°E
- Line: Line 1

History
- Opened: 29 December 2019; 6 years ago

Services
| Preceding station | Hohhot Metro | Following station |
|---|---|---|
| Jiangjunyashu towards Yili Health Valley | Line 1 | Dongyinglu towards Bayan (Airport) |
Location

Arts College station (Chinese: 艺术学院站) is a station on Line 1 of the Hohhot Metro, in Hohhot, Inner Mongolia, China. It opened on 29 December 2019.

== Station structure ==
The Art College Station is located at the intersection of Xinhua Avenue and Xing'an South Road, and is arranged along Xinhua Avenue from east to west. It is 235.3 meters long and 22.7 meters wide. It is a two-story underground island station.

== History ==
- On November 8, 2018, the main structure of the station was capped.
- On December 29, 2019, the station was opened along with Line 1.
