= Inner Mongolia Museum station =

Station of Hohhot Metro

Inner Mongolia Museum 内蒙古博物院站
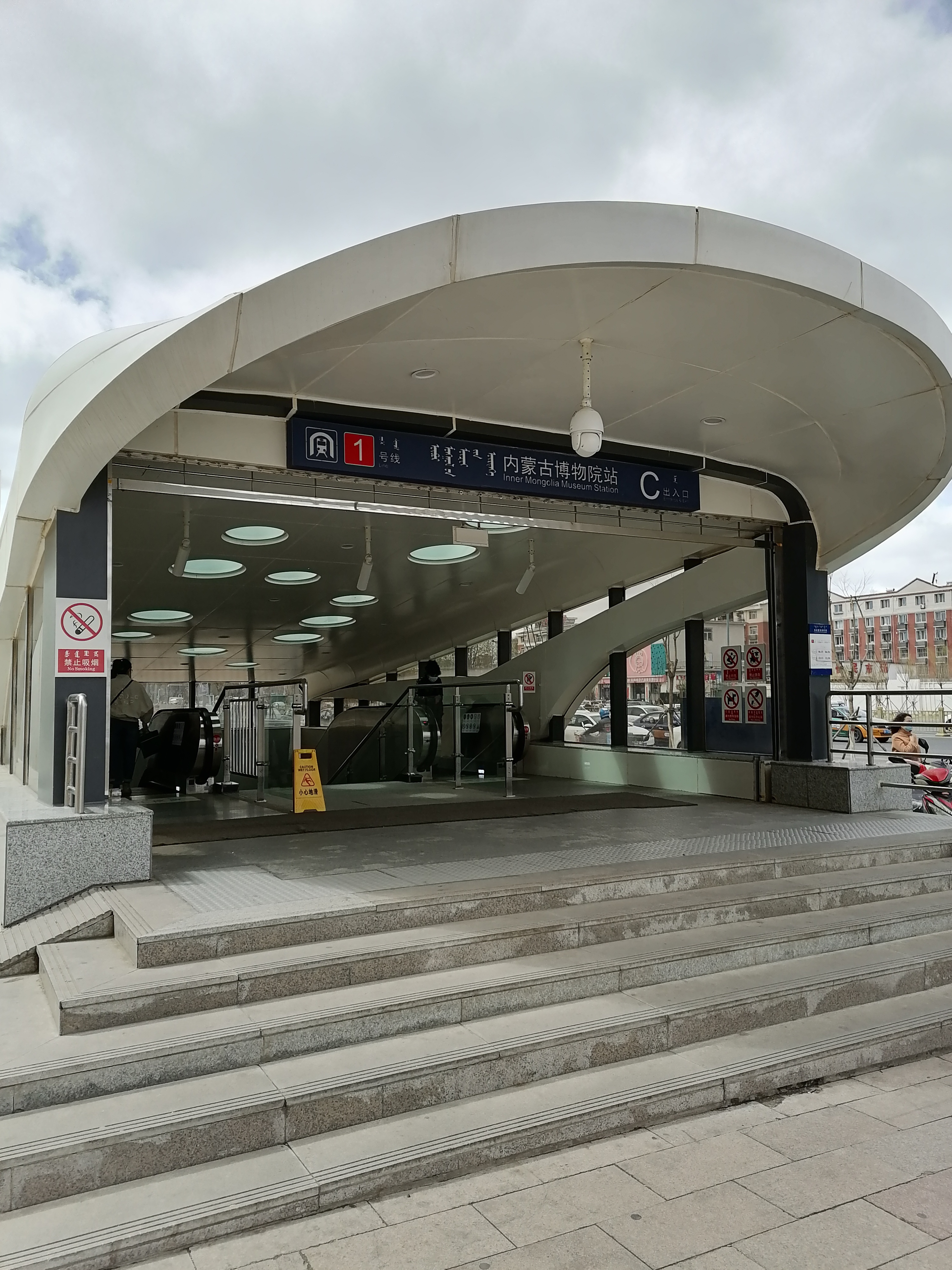
- ᠥᠪᠥᠷ ᠮᠣᠩᠭᠣᠯ ᠤᠨ ᠮᠦᠽᠧᠢ

General information
- Location: Xincheng District, Hohhot, Inner Mongolia, China
- Coordinates: 40.835358°N 111.727883°E
- Line: Line 1

History
- Opened: 29 December 2019; 6 years ago

Services
Preceding station	Hohhot Metro	Following station
Inner Mongolia Exhibition Hall towards Yili Health Valley	Line 1	City Government towards Bayan (Airport)
Location

Inner Mongolia Museum Station (Chinese: 内蒙古博物院站) is a station on Line 1 of the Hohhot Metro. It opened on 29 December 2019 and serves the nearby Inner Mongolia Museum.
