= City Government station =

Station of Hohhot Metro

City Government 市政府站
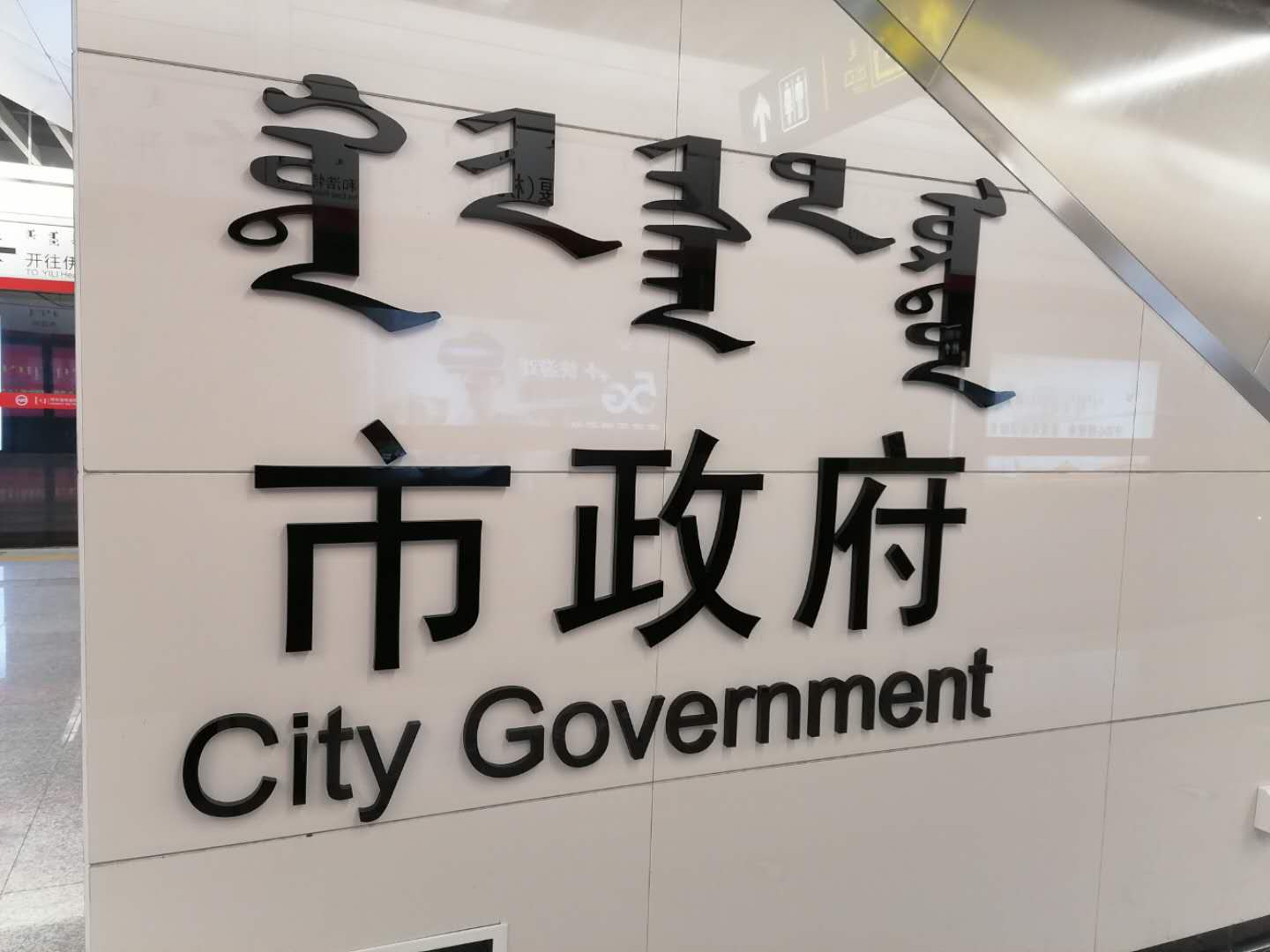
- ᠬᠣᠲᠠ ᠶᠢᠨ ᠵᠠᠰᠠᠭ ᠤᠨ ᠣᠷᠳᠣᠨ

General information
- Location: Xincheng District, Hohhot, Inner Mongolia, China
- Coordinates: 40.837964°N 111.740506°E
- Line: Line 1

History
- Opened: 29 December 2019; 6 years ago

Services
Preceding station	Hohhot Metro	Following station
Inner Mongolia Museum towards Yili Health Valley	Line 1	Hohhot East Railway Station towards Bayan (Airport)
Location

City Government Station (Chinese: 市政府站) is a station on Line 1 of the Hohhot Metro. It opened on 29 December 2019.
