= Dongyinglu station =

Station of Hohhot Metro

Dongyinglu 东影路站
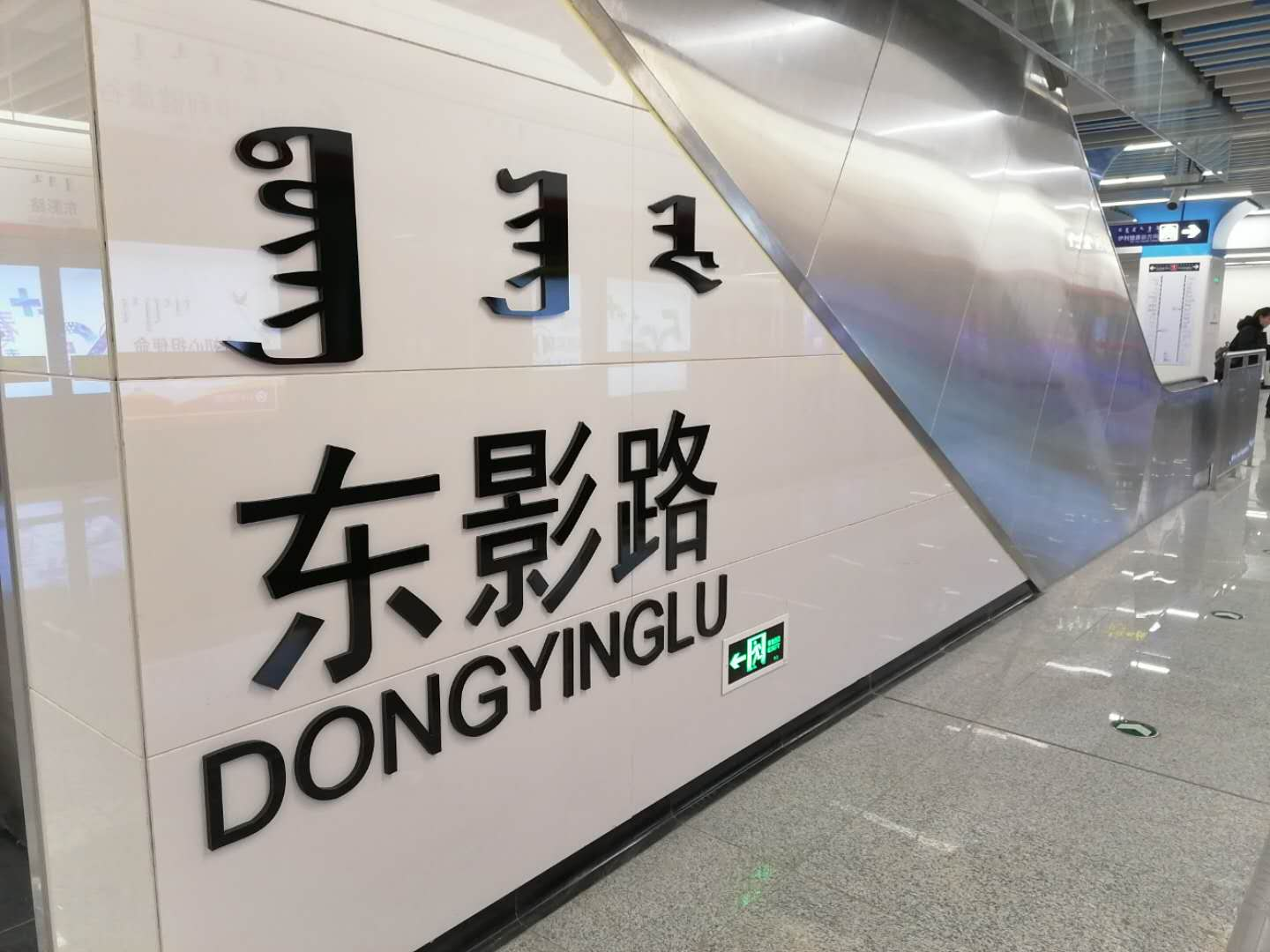
- ᠳ᠋ᠦᠩ ᠶᠢᠩ ᠵᠠᠮ

General information
- Location: Saihan District, Hohhot, Inner Mongolia, China
- Coordinates: 40.829582°N 111.702167°E
- Line: Line 1

History
- Opened: 29 December 2019; 6 years ago

Services
Preceding station	Hohhot Metro	Following station
Arts College towards Yili Health Valley	Line 1	Inner Mongolia Exhibition Hall towards Bayan (Airport)
Location

Dongyinglu Station (Chinese: 东影路站) is a station on Line 1 of the Hohhot Metro. It opened on 29 December 2019.
