= People's Hall station =

Station of Hohhot Metro

People's Hall 人民会堂站
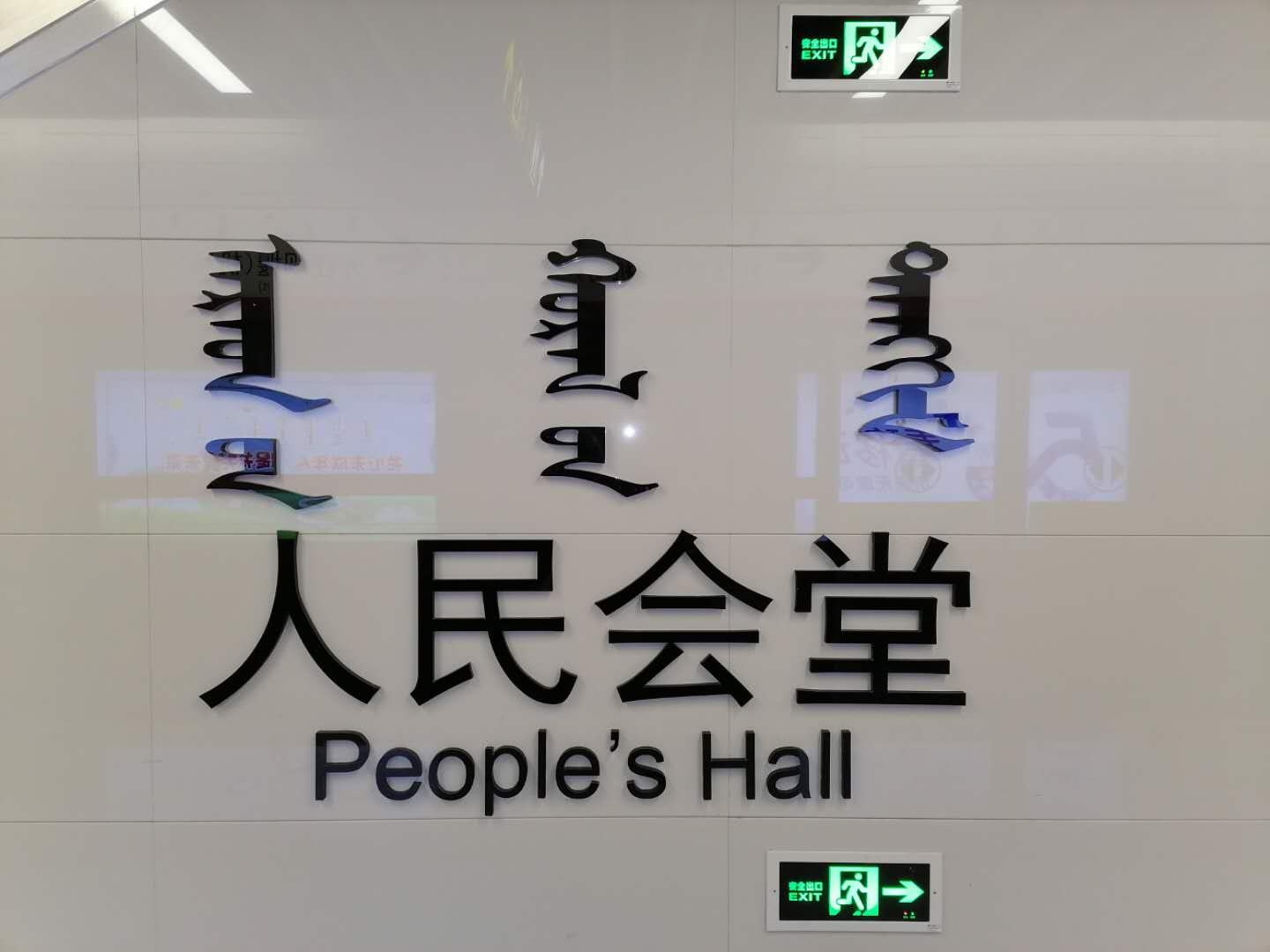
- ᠠᠷᠠᠳ ᠤᠨ ᠬᠤᠷᠠᠯ ᠤᠨ ᠲᠠᠩᠬᠢᠮ

General information
- Location: Xincheng District, Hohhot, Inner Mongolia, China
- Coordinates: 40.821857°N 111.669209°E
- Line: Line 1

History
- Opened: 29 December 2019; 6 years ago

Services
Preceding station	Hohhot Metro	Following station
Xinhua Square towards Yili Health Valley	Line 1	Jiangjunyashu towards Bayan (Airport)
Location

People's Hall Station (Chinese: 人民会堂站) is a station on Line 1 of the Hohhot Metro. It opened on 29 December 2019.
