= Jiangjunyashu station =

Station of Hohhot Metro

Jiangjunyashu 将军衙署站
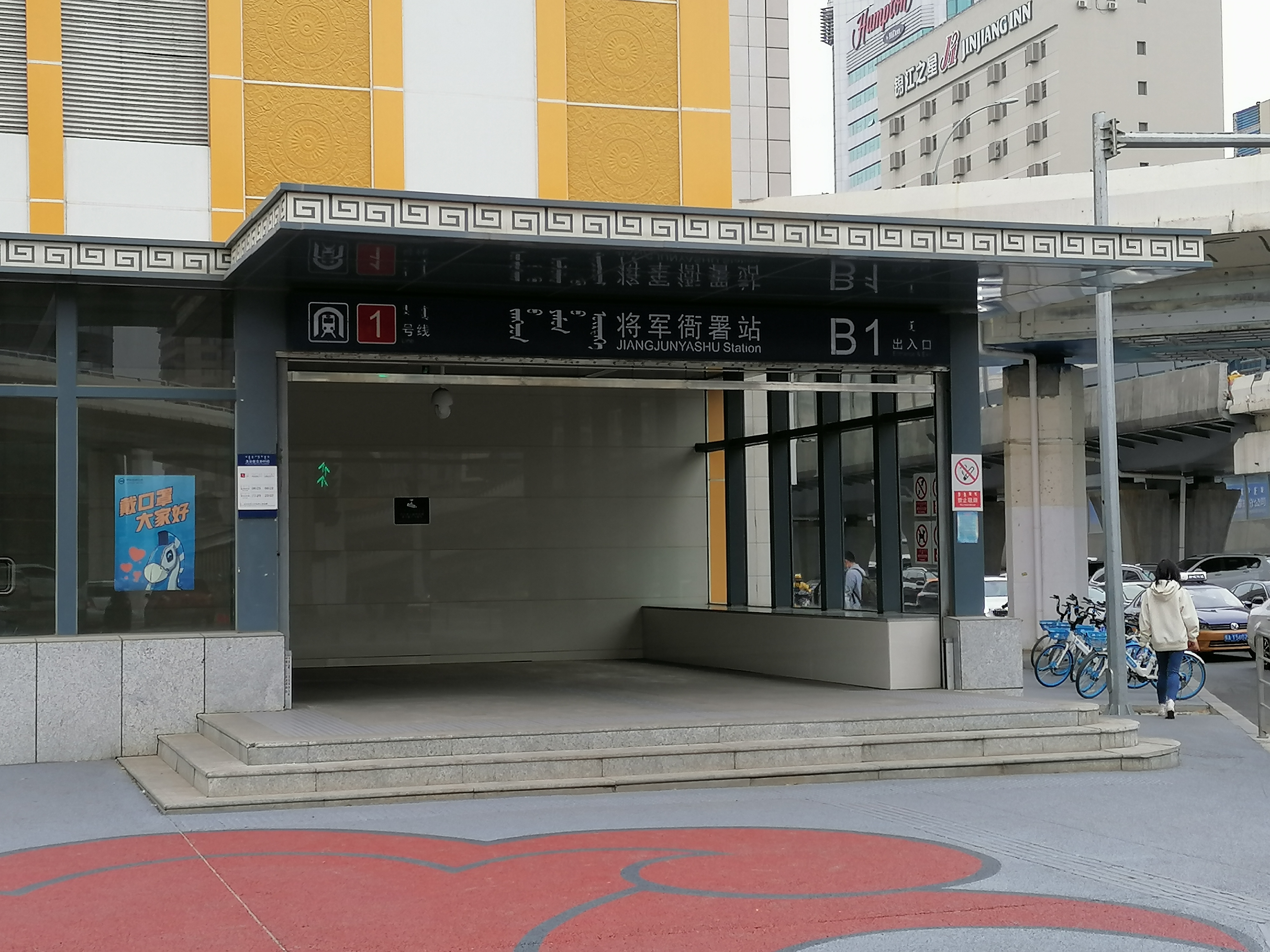
- ᠵᠠᠩᠵᠤᠨ ᠤ ᠶᠠᠮᠤᠨ

General information
- Location: Xincheng District, Hohhot, Inner Mongolia, China
- Coordinates: 40.824729°N 111.683007°E
- Line: Line 1

History
- Opened: 29 December 2019; 6 years ago

Services
| Preceding station | Hohhot Metro | Following station |
|---|---|---|
| People's Hall towards Yili Health Valley | Line 1 | Arts College towards Bayan (Airport) |
Location

Jiangjunyashu Station (Chinese: 将军衙署站) is a station on Line 1 of the Hohhot Metro. It opened on 29 December 2019.
