= Hugangnanlu station =

Metro station in Inner Mongolia, China

Hugangnanlu 呼钢南路站
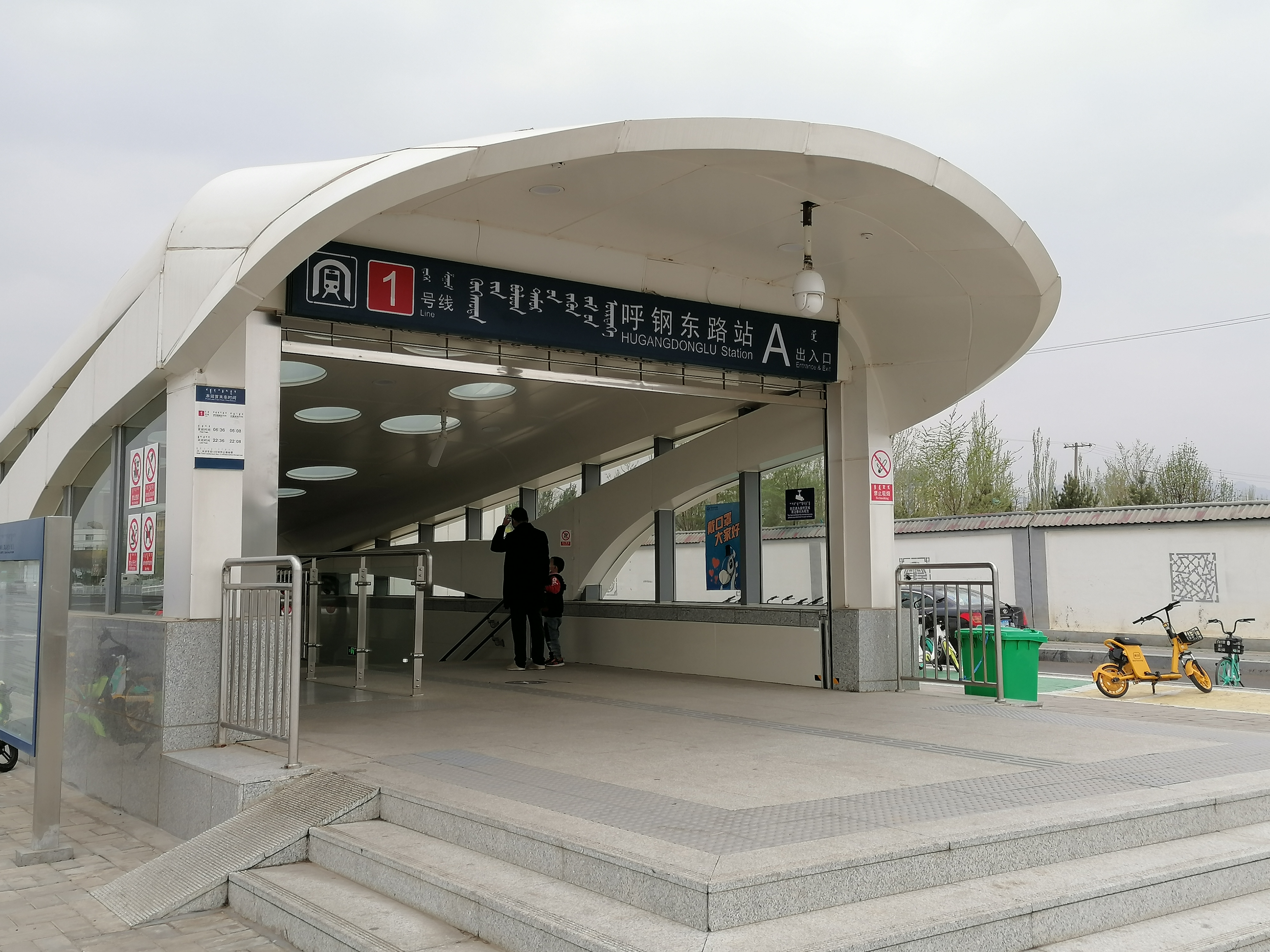
- ᠬᠥᠬᠡᠬᠣᠲᠠ ᠶᠢᠨ ᠪᠣᠯᠣᠳ ᠲᠡᠮᠦᠷ ᠦ᠋ᠨ ᠡᠮᠦᠨ᠎ᠡ ᠵᠠᠮ

General information
- Location: Huimin District, Hohhot, Inner Mongolia, China
- Coordinates: 40.803853°N 111.610486°E
- Line: Line 1

History
- Opened: 29 December 2019; 6 years ago

Services
Preceding station	Hohhot Metro	Following station
Kongjiaying towards Yili Health Valley	Line 1	Xilongwangmiao towards Bayan (Airport)
Location

Hugangnanlu station (Chinese: 呼钢南路站; pinyin: Hūgāngnánlù zhàn) is a station on Line 1 of the Hohhot Metro. It opened on 29 December 2019 as Hugangdonglu station, and renamed to Hugangnanlu station on 1 November 2023.
