= Kongjiaying station =

Metro station in Hohhot, China

Kongjiaying 孔家营站
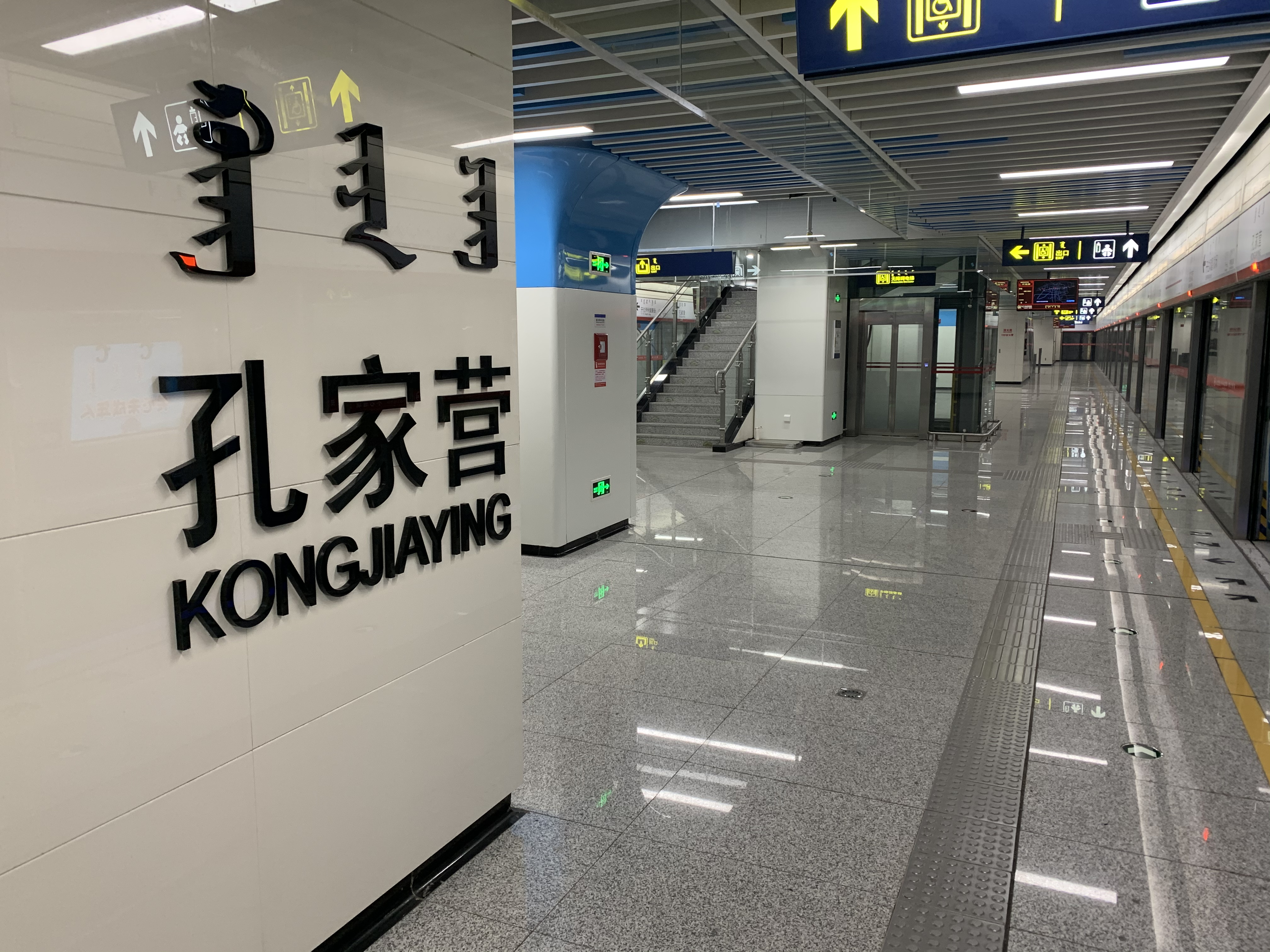
- Platform
- ᠺᠦᠩ ᠵᠢᠶᠠ ᠶᠢᠩ

General information
- Location: Huimin District, Hohhot, Inner Mongolia, China
- Coordinates: 40.798489°N 111.597786°E
- Line: Line 1

History
- Opened: 29 December 2019; 6 years ago

Services
Preceding station	Hohhot Metro	Following station
Xi'erhuanlu towards Yili Health Valley	Line 1	Hugangnanlu towards Bayan (Airport)
Location

Kongjiaying Station (Chinese: 孔家营站) is a station on Line 1 of the Hohhot Metro. It opened on 29 December 2019.
