= Wulanfu Memorial Hall station =

Station of Hohhot Metro

Wulanfu Memorial Hall 乌兰夫纪念馆站
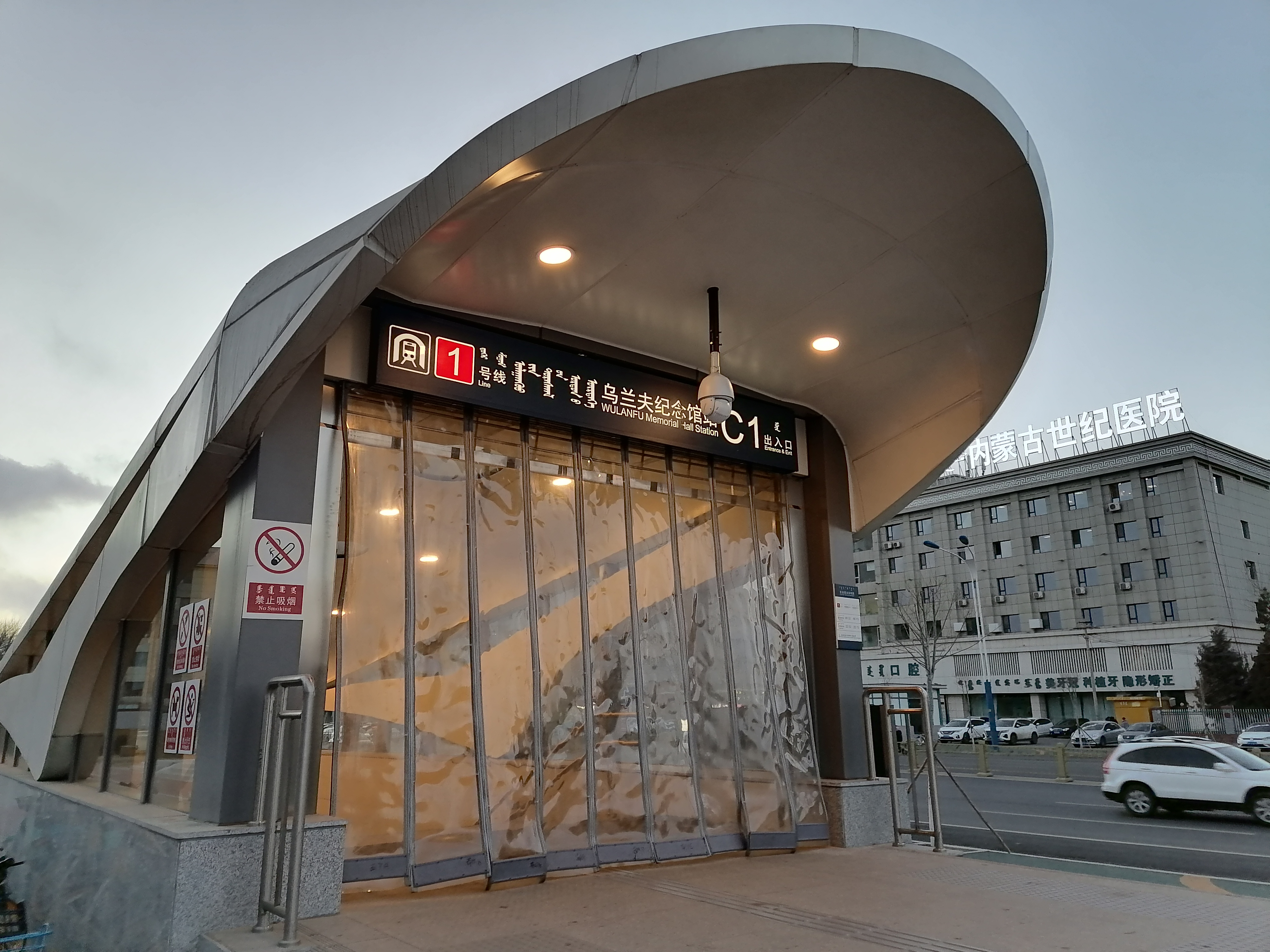
- ᠤᠯᠠᠭᠠᠨᠬᠦᠦ ᠶᠢᠨ ᠳᠤᠷᠠᠰᠬᠠᠯ ᠤᠨ ᠣᠷᠳᠣᠨ

General information
- Location: Huimin District, Hohhot, Inner Mongolia, China
- Coordinates: 40.814236°N 111.635215°E
- Line: Line 1

History
- Opened: 29 December 2019; 6 years ago

Services
Preceding station	Hohhot Metro	Following station
Xilongwangmiao towards Yili Health Valley	Line 1	Affiliated Hospital towards Bayan (Airport)
Location

Wulanfu Memorial Hall Station (Chinese: 乌兰夫纪念馆站) is a station on Line 1 of the Hohhot Metro. It opened on 29 December 2019.
