= Affiliated Hospital station =

Station of Hohhot Metro

Affiliated Hospital 附属医院站
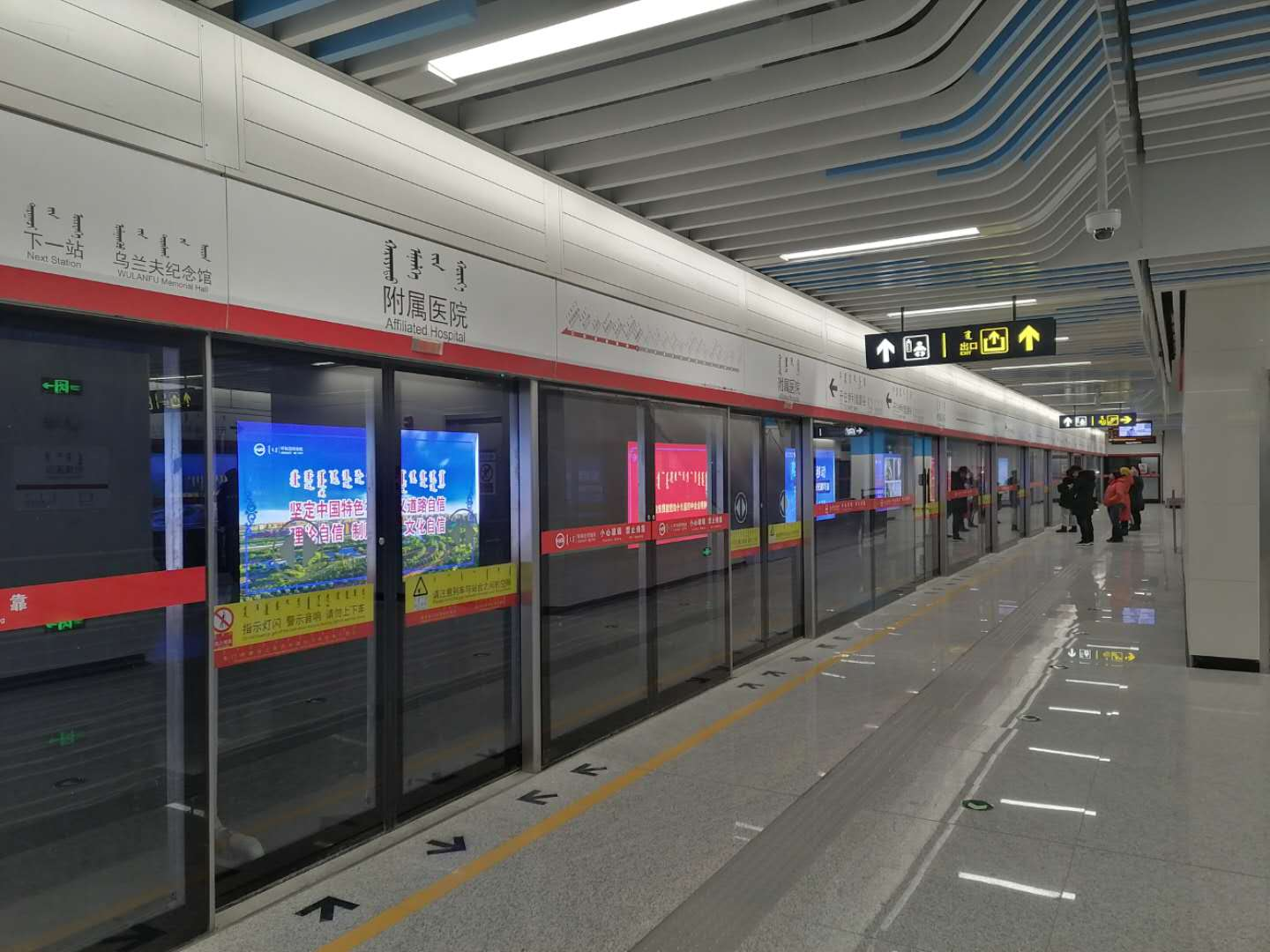
- ᠬᠠᠷᠢᠶᠠᠲᠤ ᠡᠮᠨᠡᠯᠭᠡ ᠶᠢᠨ ᠬᠣᠷᠢᠶ᠎ᠠ

General information
- Location: Huimin District, Hohhot, Inner Mongolia, China
- Coordinates: 40.817339°N 111.648625°E
- Line: Line 1

History
- Opened: 29 December 2019; 6 years ago

Services
Preceding station	Hohhot Metro	Following station
Wulanfu Memorial Hall towards Yili Health Valley	Line 1	Xinhua Square towards Bayan (Airport)
Location

Affiliated Hospital Station (Chinese: 附属医院站) is a station on Line 1 of the Hohhot Metro. It opened on 29 December 2019.
