= Xilongwangmiao station =

Station of Hohhot Metro

Xilongwangmiao 西龙王庙站
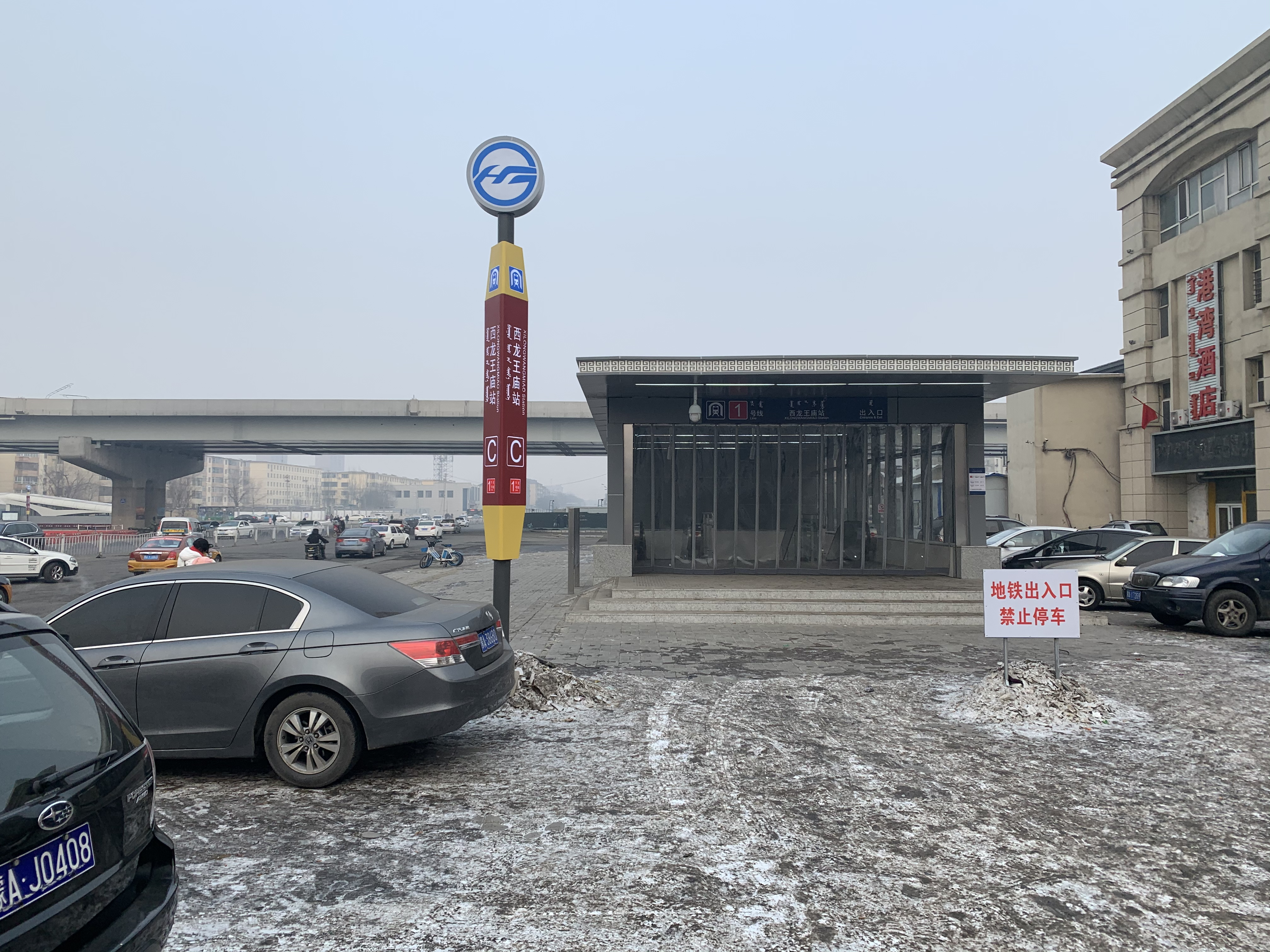
- Xilongwangmiao Exit C
- ᠪᠠᠷᠠᠭᠤᠨ ᠯᠤᠤᠰ ᠤᠨ ᠰᠦᠮ᠎ᠡ

General information
- Location: Huimin District, Hohhot, Inner Mongolia, China
- Coordinates: 40.809936°N 111.625204°E
- Line: Line 1

History
- Opened: 29 December 2019; 6 years ago

Services
Preceding station	Hohhot Metro	Following station
Hugangnanlu towards Yili Health Valley	Line 1	Wulanfu Memorial Hall towards Bayan (Airport)
Location

Xilongwangmiao Station (Chinese: 西龙王庙站) is a station on Line 1 of the Hohhot Metro. It opened on 29 December 2019.
