= Bayan station =

Bayan station may refer to:

- Bayan (Airport) station, a metro station on Line 1 of the Hohhot Metro in Saihan District, Hohhot, China
- Bayan station (Qinghai–Tibet railway), a railway station in Hualong Hui Autonomous County, Haidong, Qinghai, China
