= Baita West station =

Metro station in Hohhot, China

Baita West 白塔西站
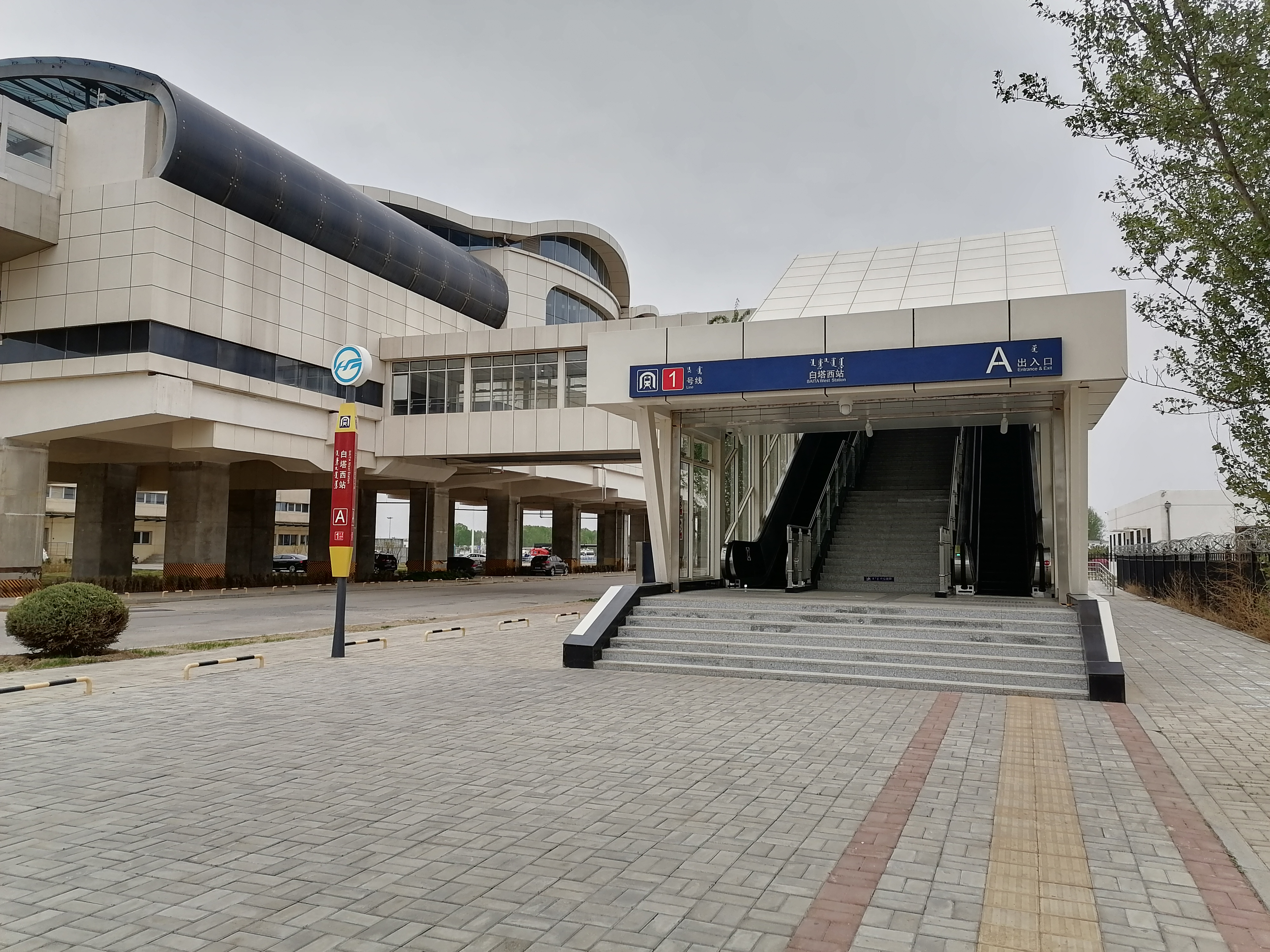
- ᠴᠠᠭᠠᠨ ᠰᠤᠪᠤᠷᠭ᠎ᠠ ᠶᠢᠨ ᠪᠠᠷᠠᠭᠤᠨ

General information
- Location: Saihan District, Hohhot, Inner Mongolia, China
- Coordinates: 40.853339°N 111.804834°E
- Line: Line 1

History
- Opened: 29 December 2019; 6 years ago

Services
Preceding station	Hohhot Metro	Following station
Shilandai towards Yili Health Valley	Line 1	Bayan (Airport) Terminus
Location

Baita West Station (Chinese: 白塔西站) is a station on Line 1 of the Hohhot Metro. It opened on 29 December 2019. It serves the international terminal of Hohhot Baita International Airport.
