= Huimin, Hohhot =

Huimin 回民区 • ᠬᠣᠳᠣᠩ ᠠᠷᠠᠳ ᠤᠨ ᠲᠣᠭᠣᠷᠢᠭ
- District
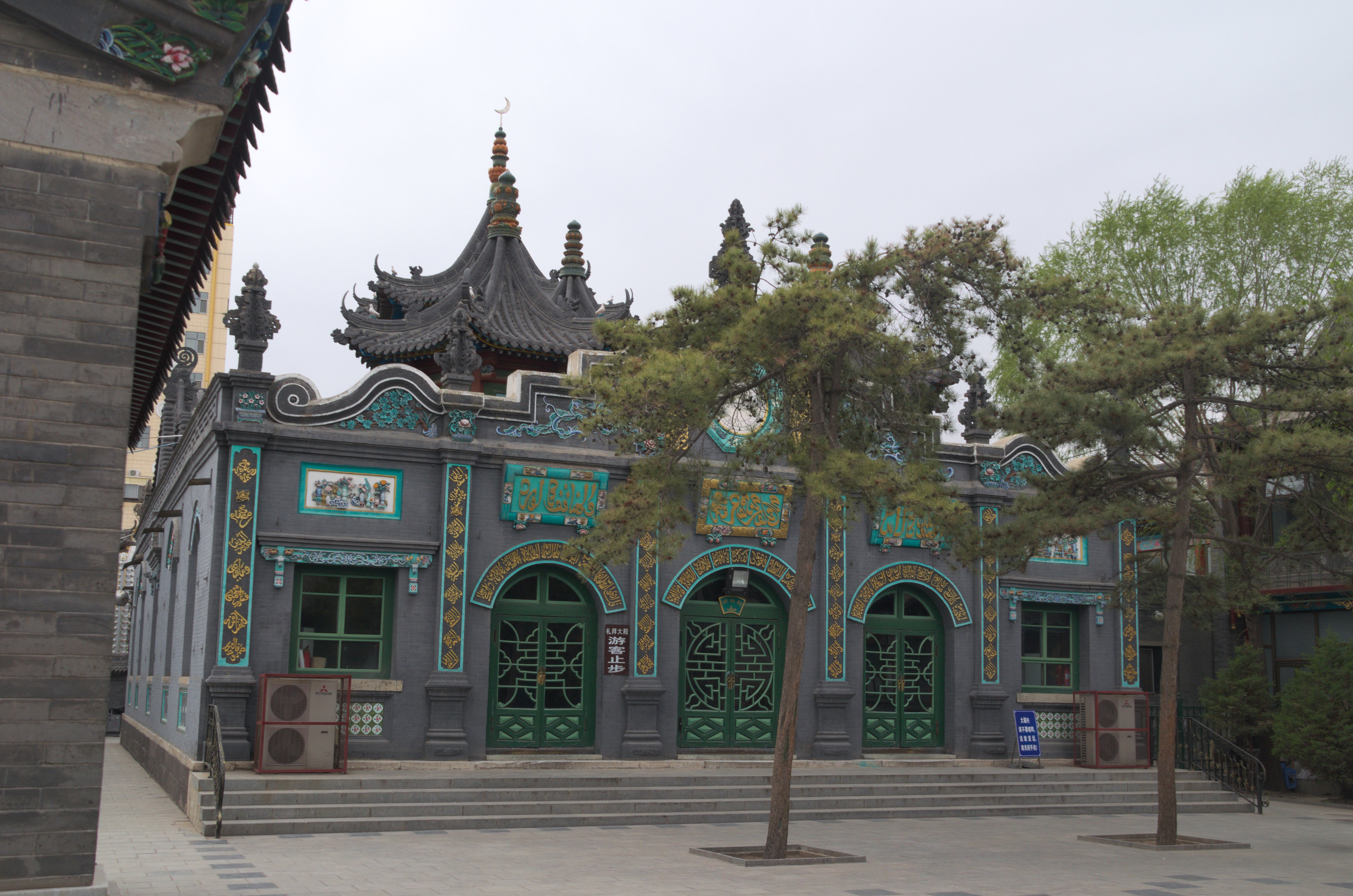
- Great Mosque of Hohhot in the Huimin District.

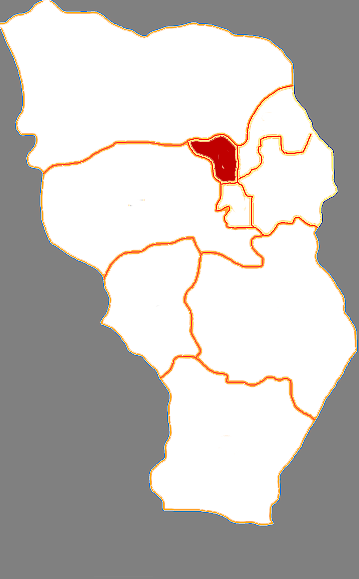
- Location of Huimin in Hohhot

- Location within Inner Mongolia Location within China
- Coordinates: 40°48′31″N 111°37′25″E
- Country: China
- Autonomous region: Inner Mongolia
- Prefecture-level city: Hohhot
- District seat: Xinhua West Road Subdistrict

Area
  - Total: 194.4 km^{2} (75.1 sq mi)
- Elevation: 1,049 m (3,442 ft)

Population (2020)
  - Total: 436,042
  - Density: 2,243/km^{2} (5,809/sq mi)
- Time zone: UTC+8 (China Standard)
- Division code: HMQ
- Website: www.huiminqu.gov.cn

Huimin, Hohhot

Chinese name
- Simplified Chinese: 回民区
- Traditional Chinese: 回民區
Transcriptions
Standard Mandarin
- Hanyu Pinyin: Huímín Qū

Mongolian name
- Mongolian Cyrillic: Хотон ардын тойрог
- Mongolian script: ᠬᠣᠳᠣᠩ ᠠᠷᠠᠳ ᠤᠨ ᠲᠣᠭᠣᠷᠢᠭ
Transcriptions
- SASM/GNC: Qotoŋ Arad-un toɣoriɣ

Huimin District (Mongolian: ᠬᠣᠳᠣᠩ ᠠᠷᠠᠳ ᠤᠨ ᠲᠣᠭᠣᠷᠢᠭ, Хотон ардын тойрог; Chinese: 回民区) is one of the four districts of the prefecture-level city of Hohhot, the capital of Inner Mongolia Autonomous Region, North China. Located in the northwest of the city center, it borders Yuquan District to the south, Xincheng District to the east, Tumed Left Banner to the west, and Wuchuan County to the north. The district is designated as a Hui ethnic district.

== Subdivisions ==
Huimin District is made up of 7 subdistricts and 1 town.

Name	Simplified Chinese	Hanyu Pinyin	Mongolian (Hudum Script)	Mongolian (Cyrillic)	Administrative division code
Subdistricts
Xinhua West Road Subdistrict	新华西路街道	Xīnhuáxīlù Jiēdào	ᠰᠢᠨᠬᠤᠸᠠ ᠪᠠᠷᠠᠭᠤᠨ ᠵᠠᠮ ᠤᠨ ᠵᠡᠭᠡᠯᠢ ᠭᠤᠳᠤᠮᠵᠢ	Шэнхуа баруун замын зээл гудамж	150103001
Zhongshan West Road Subdistrict	中山西路街道	Zhōngshānxīlù Jiēdào	ᠵᠦᠩᠱᠠᠨ ᠪᠠᠷᠠᠭᠤᠨ ᠵᠠᠮ ᠤᠨ ᠵᠡᠭᠡᠯᠢ ᠭᠤᠳᠤᠮᠵᠢ	Жүншин баруун замын зээл гудамж	150103002
Guangming Road Subdistrict	光明路街道	Guāngmínglù Jiēdào	ᠭᠤᠸᠠᠩ ᠮᠢᠩ ᠵᠠᠮ ᠤᠨ ᠵᠡᠭᠡᠯᠢ ᠭᠤᠳᠤᠮᠵᠢ	Гуан мин замын зээл гудамж	150103003
Hailar West Road Subdistrict	海拉尔西路街道	Hǎilā'ěrxīlù Jiēdào	ᠬᠠᠢᠯᠠᠷ ᠪᠠᠷᠠᠭᠤᠨ ᠵᠠᠮ ᠤᠨ ᠵᠡᠭᠡᠯᠢ ᠭᠤᠳᠤᠮᠵᠢ	Хайлаар баруун замын зээл гудамж	150103004
Huanhe Street Subdistrict	环河街街道	Huánhéjiē Jiēdào	ᠬᠤᠸᠠᠨ ᠾᠧ ᠵᠡᠭᠡᠯᠢ ᠶᠢᠨ ᠵᠡᠭᠡᠯᠢ ᠭᠤᠳᠤᠮᠵᠢ	Хуан ге зээлийн зээл гудамж	150103005
Tongdao Street Subdistrict	通道街街道	Tōngdàojiē Jiēdào	ᠲᠦᠩ ᠳ᠋ᠣᠤ ᠵᠡᠭᠡᠯᠢ ᠶᠢᠨ ᠵᠡᠭᠡᠯᠢ ᠭᠤᠳᠤᠮᠵᠢ	Дүн доо зээлийн зээл гудамж	150103006
Gangtie Road Subdistrict	钢铁路街道	Gāngtiělù Jiēdào	ᠪᠣᠯᠣᠳ ᠲᠡᠮᠦᠷ ᠵᠠᠮ ᠤᠨ ᠵᠡᠭᠡᠯᠢ ᠭᠤᠳᠤᠮᠵᠢ	Болд дамар замын зээл гудамж	150103007
Town
Yumin Baixing Town	攸攸板镇	Yōuyōubǎn Zhèn	ᠶᠦᠮ ᠦᠨ ᠪᠠᠢᠰᠢᠩ ᠪᠠᠯᠭᠠᠰᠤ	Юмийн байшин балгас	150103100

== Transport ==
=== Metro ===
Huimin is currently served by two lines and seven stations of the Hohhot Metro.

- 1 - Xi'erhuanlu, Kongjiaying, Hugangnanlu, Xilongwangmiao, Wulanfu Memorial Hall, Affiliated Hospital, Xinhua Square 2
- 2 - Xinhua Square 1

== Tourist attractions ==
- Great Mosque of Hohhot
