= Inner Mongolia Museum =

Museum in Hohhot, Inner Mongolia, China

Coordinates: 40°50′17.88″N 111°43′52″E

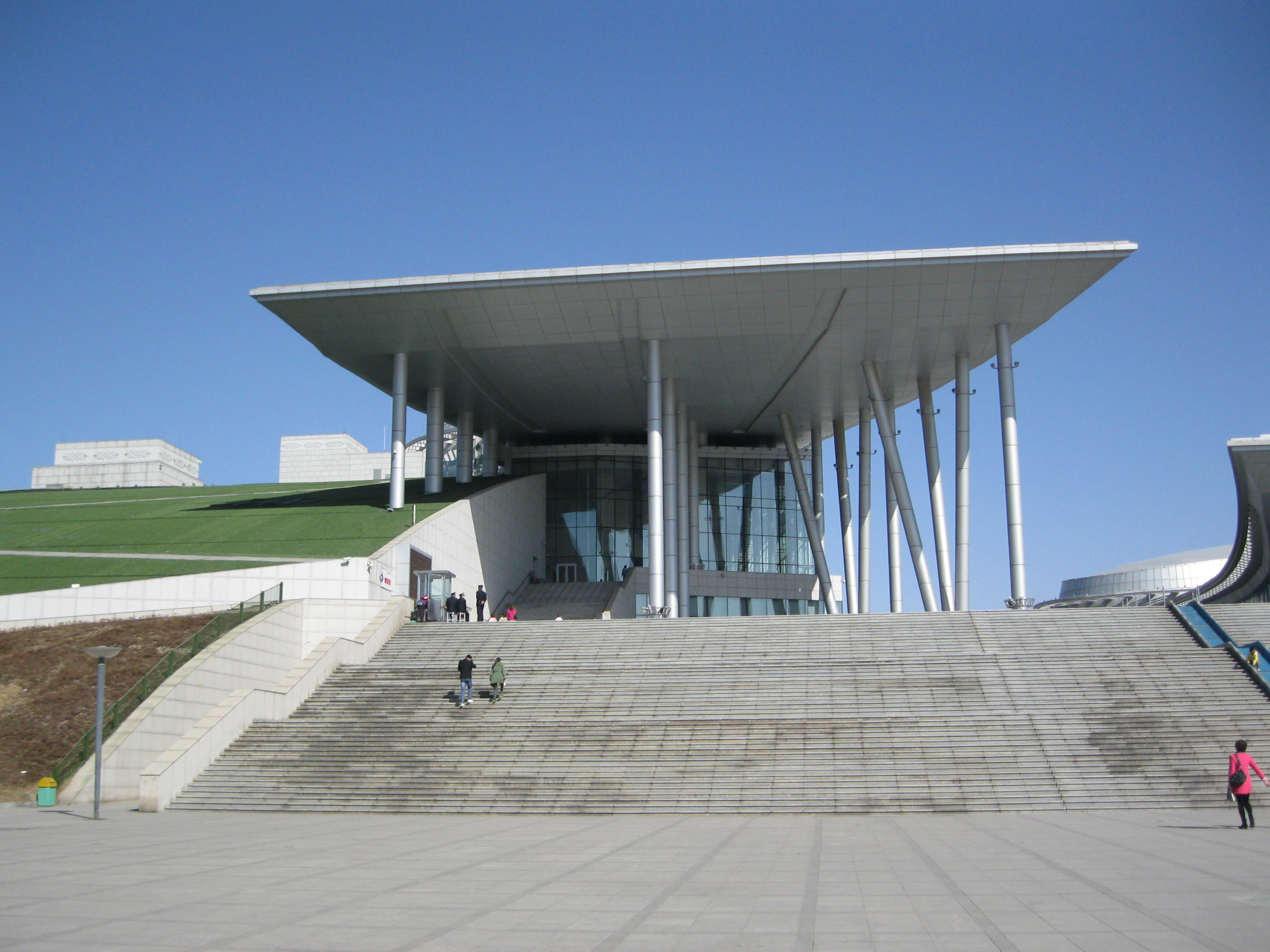
Inner Mongolia Museum

The Inner Mongolia Museum (simplified Chinese: 内蒙古博物院; traditional Chinese: 內蒙古博物院; pinyin: Nèiměnggǔ Bówùyuàn) is a regional museum in the city of Hohhot in Inner Mongolia, in north China.

== History and location ==
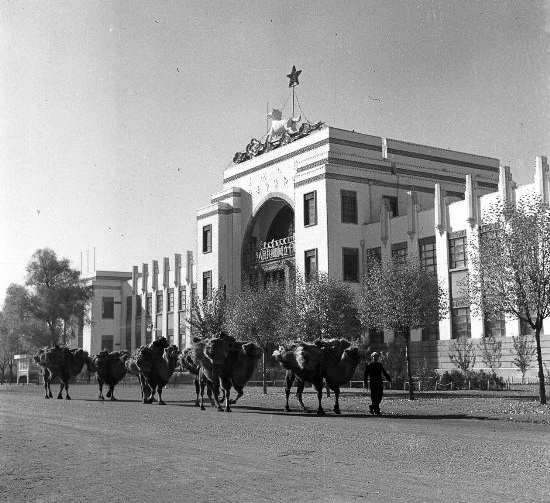
The original Inner Mongolia Museum in late 1950s, with a line of camels passing by.

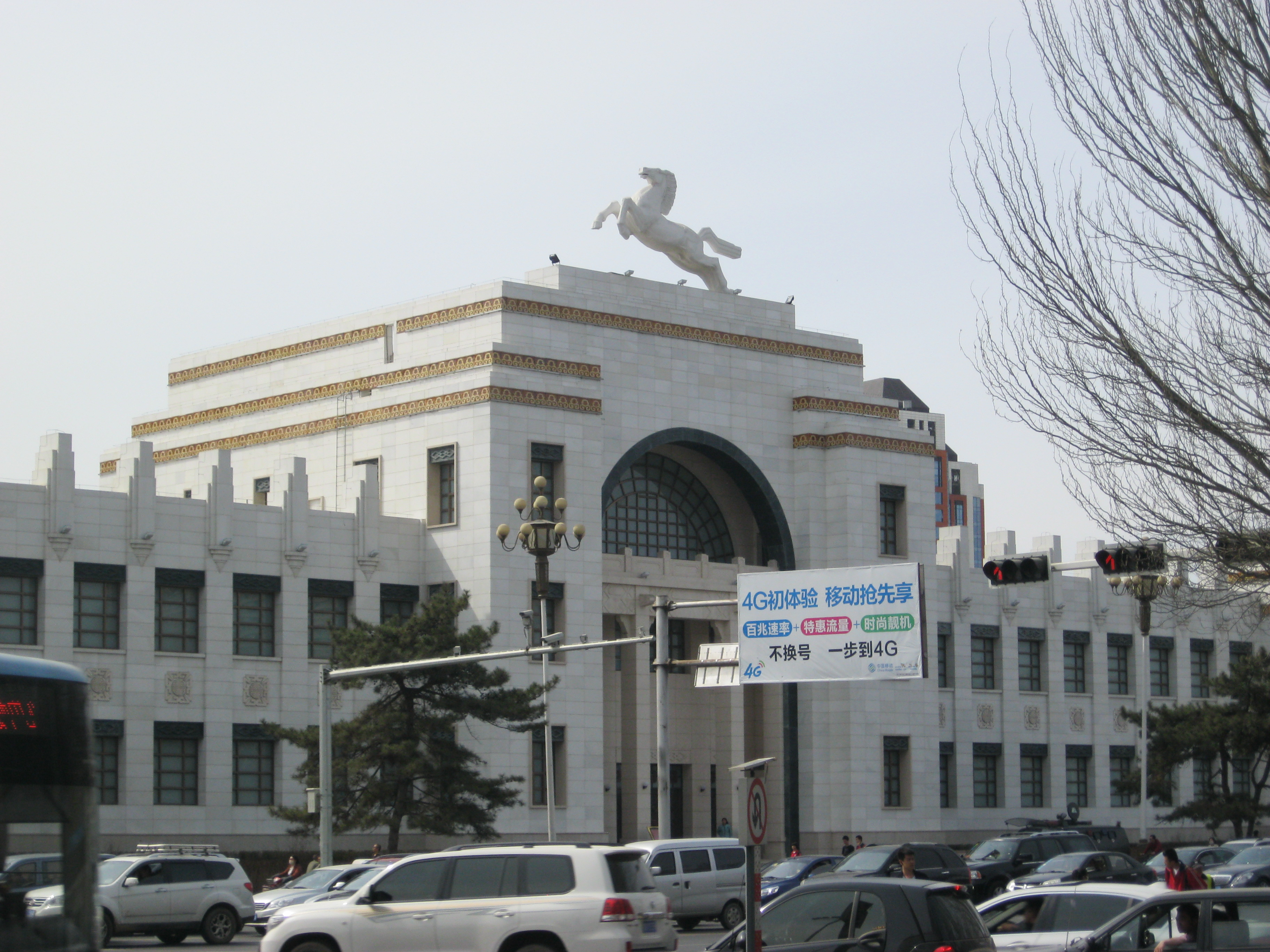
The original Inner Mongolia Museum building in 2014

In 2007, a newer and 10 times bigger modern museum was constructed about 5 kilometers to the east, located at the intersection of Xinhua East Street and East 2nd Ring Road. All the exhibition objects were moved to the new building, while the original building still remained open to public, for temporary exhibitions, such as a calligraphy exhibition as of 2014.

As of 2020, the museum is served by a metro station on Line 1 of the Hohhot Metro.

== Exhibitions ==
The museum in particular offers an insight into the history and traditions of the Mongolian people, exhibiting paraphernalia used by nomadic Mongols, including saddles, costumes, archery and polo equipment, and a ger (a portable tent used by Central Asian nomads).

The Inner Mongolia Museum is renowned for its extensive collection of fossils, dinosaur and feathered dinosaur remains found in both Inner Mongolia and Outer Mongolia including a complete skeleton of a wooly rhinoceros unearthed from a coal mine in Manzhouli.

In 2023, the Genghis Khan exhibition was replaced as part of a campaign under Xi Jinping to remove references to Genghis Khan and his origins.

Many of the maps and objects on display have English captions.

The museum also contains a number of intricate Mongol bone carvings depicting historical events.

Second Floor, Nature:

- 远古世界 Prehistoric World: The fossils of living beings, especially dinosaurs, as Inner Mongolia is rich is dinosaur fossil.
- 高原壮阔 Broad Plateau: The current animals and plants of Inner Mongolia
- 地下宝藏 Treasures Underground: The mineral deposits of Inner Mongolia.
- 飞天神舟 Shenzhou Spacecraft: Both the launching and landing sites of Chinese Shenzhou spacecraft are located in Inner Mongolia.

Third Floor, History:

- 草原雄风 The Power of the Grassland: The northern tribes before Mongolians, such as Donghu, Xiongnu, Xianbei, Turk, and Qidan.
- 草原风情 The Customs of the Grassland: Modern ethnic groups of Inner Mongolia, including Mongolian, Han, Hui, Dawuer, Ewenke, Elunchun, and so on.
- 草原烽火 The Beacon Fire on the Grassland: The Communists of Inner Mongolia in the past century.

Fourth Floor, Culture: (under preparation as of April 2014)

- 草原日出 The Sunrise on the Grassland: Neolithic exhibition
- 风云骑士 Knights of Cloud and Wind: The northern nomads and their horses
- 草原服饰 Costumes on the Grassland
- 苍穹旋律 The melody under the sky: The musical and dancing history of nomads
- 草原华章 The Magnificence of the Grassland: The paintings from Neolithic to Qing dynasty
- 古道遗珍 The Remaining Treasure on the Ancient Road: Antiques on the Silk Road, which passes Inner Mongolia

== See also ==
- List of museums in China
