= Xi'erhuanlu station =

Station of Hohhot Metro

Xi'erhuanlu 西二环路
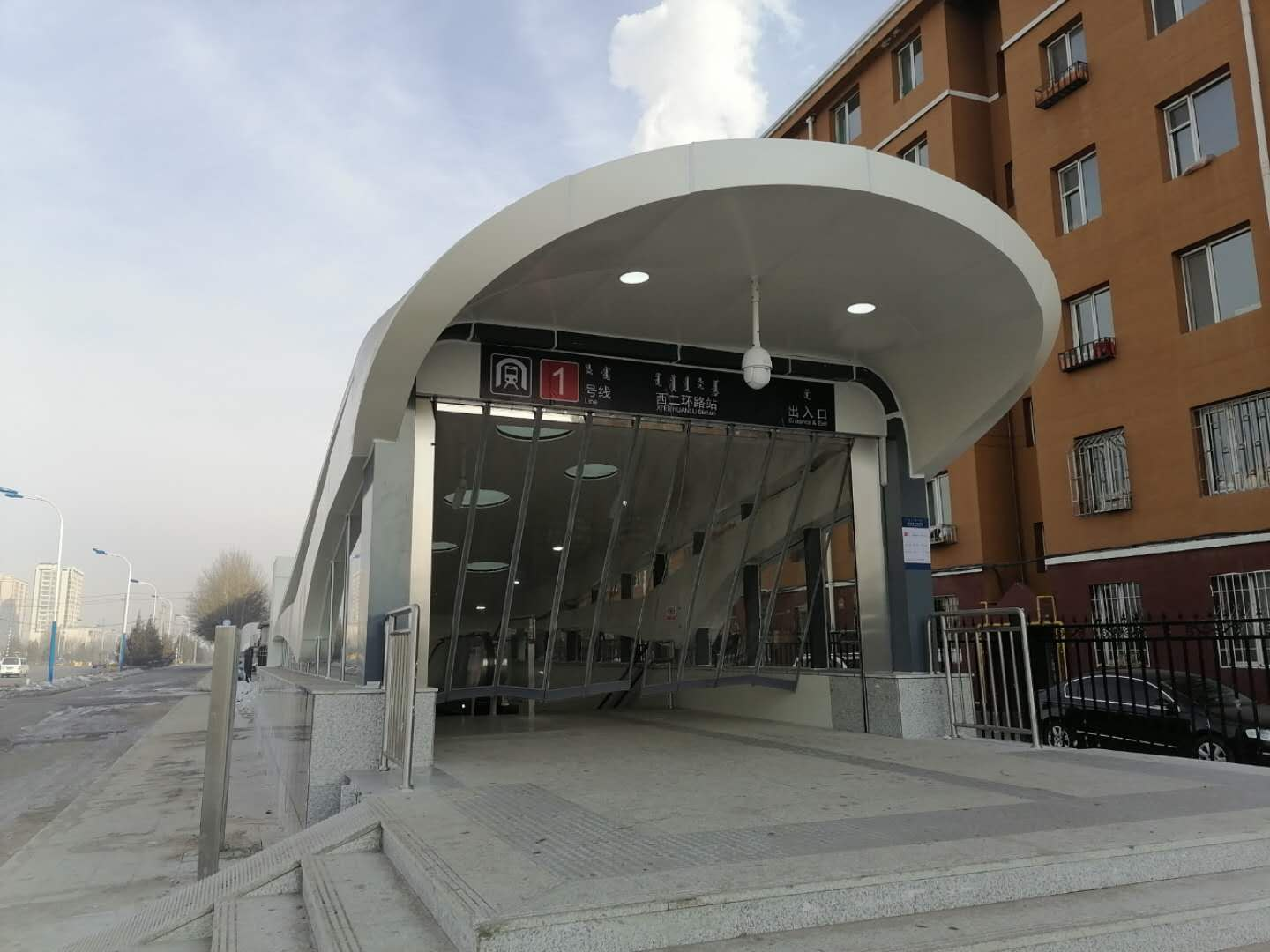
- ᠪᠠᠷᠠᠭᠤᠨ ᠬᠣᠶᠠᠳᠤᠭᠠᠷ ᠲᠣᠭᠣᠷᠢᠭ ᠵᠠᠮ

General information
- Location: Huimin District, Hohhot, Inner Mongolia, China
- Coordinates: 40.793586°N 111.584993°E
- Line: Line 1

History
- Opened: 29 December 2019; 6 years ago

Services
Preceding station	Hohhot Metro	Following station
Yili Health Valley Terminus	Line 1	Kongjiaying towards Bayan (Airport)
Location

Xi'erhuanlu Station (Chinese: 西二环路) is a station on Line 1 of the Hohhot Metro. It opened on 29 December 2019.

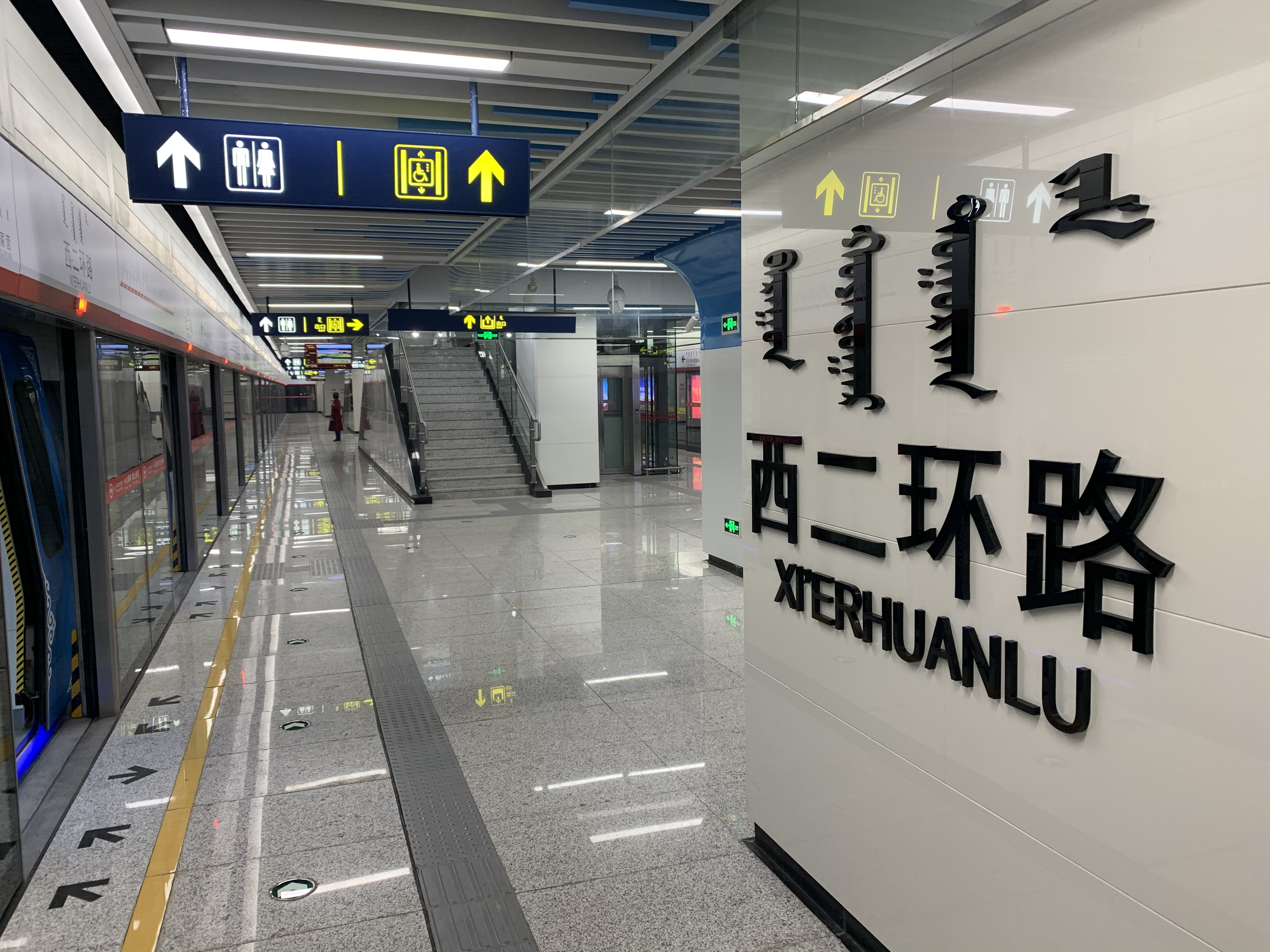
Inside the station. Train to the left.

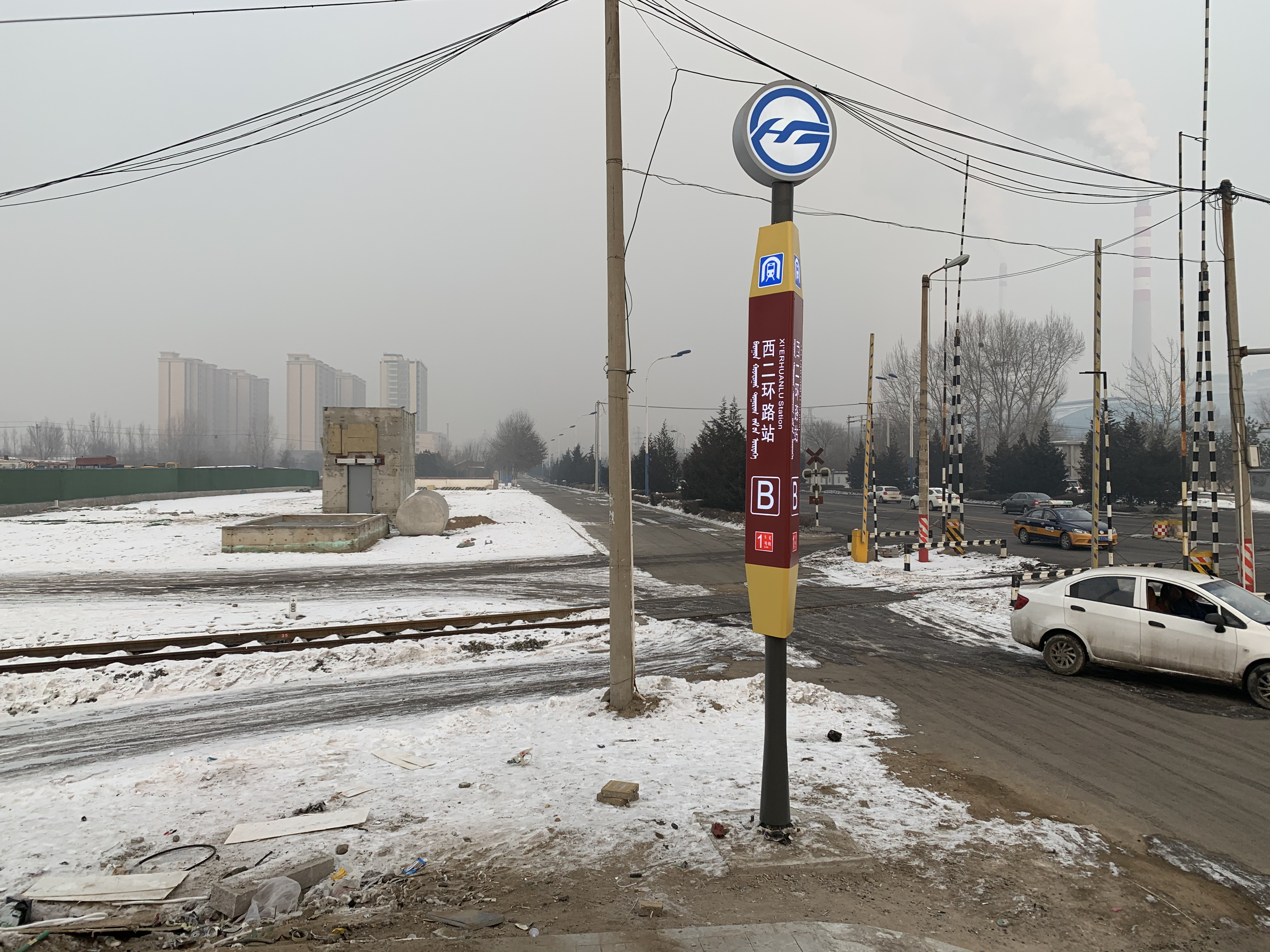
Sign for Exit B of Xi'erhuanlu Station.
