= Xinhua Square station =

Station of Hohhot Metro

Xinhua Square 新华广场站
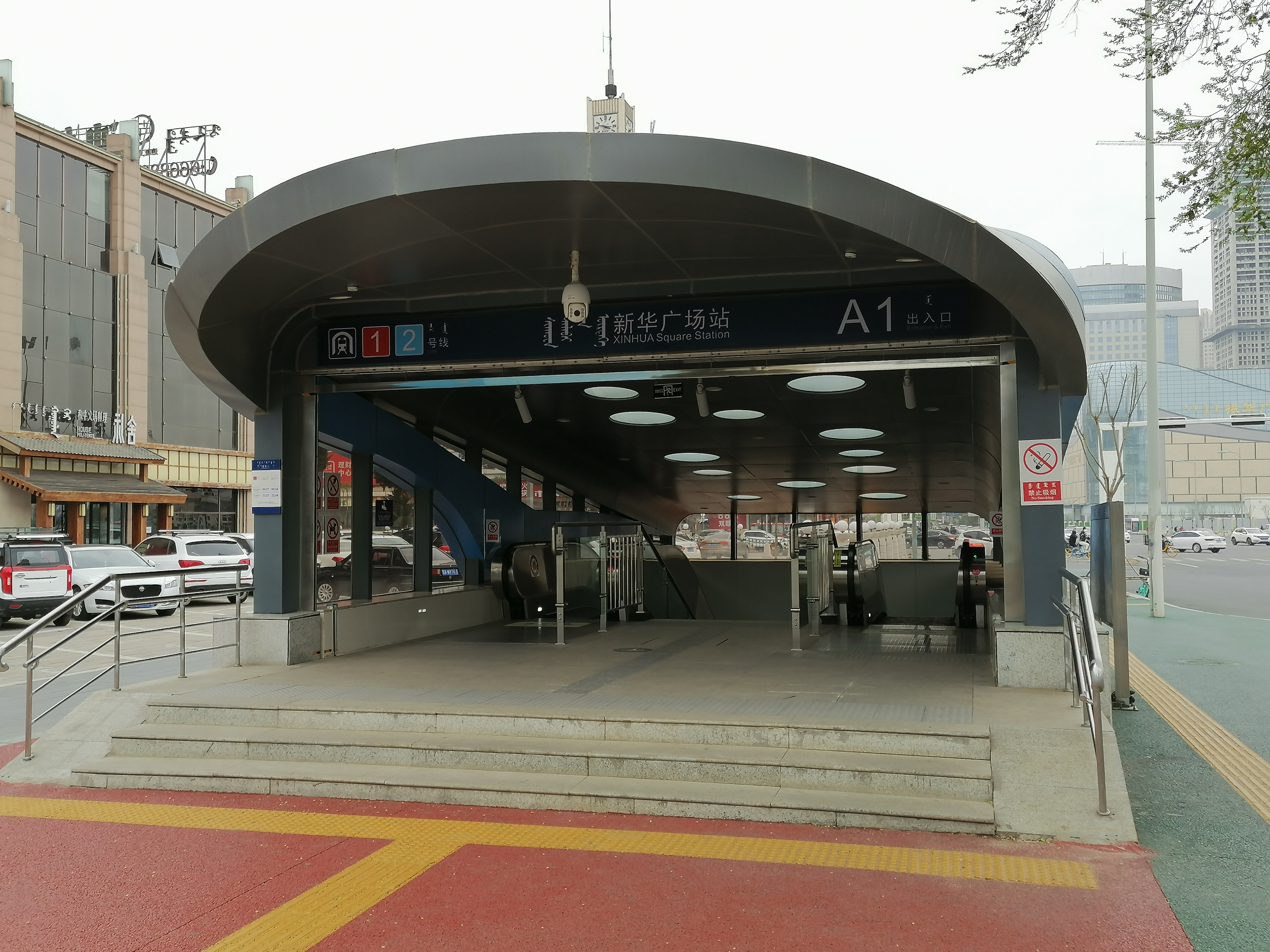
- ᠰᠢᠨᠬᠤᠸᠠ ᠲᠠᠯᠠᠪᠠᠢ

General information
- Location: Xincheng District, Hohhot, Inner Mongolia, China
- Coordinates: 40.819894°N 111.659763°E
- Lines: Line 1 Line 2

History
- Opened: 29 December 2019; 6 years ago

Services
Preceding station	Hohhot Metro	Following station
Affiliated Hospital towards Yili Health Valley	Line 1	People's Hall towards Bayan (Airport)
Hohhot Railway Station towards Talidonglu	Line 2	Zhongshanlu towards A'ershanlu
Location

Xinhua Square Station (Chinese: 新华广场站) is an interchange station on Line 1 & Line 2 of the Hohhot Metro. It opened on 29 December 2019.
