= Great Mosque of Hohhot =

Mosque in Hohhot, Inner Mongolia, China

- 呼和浩特清真大寺
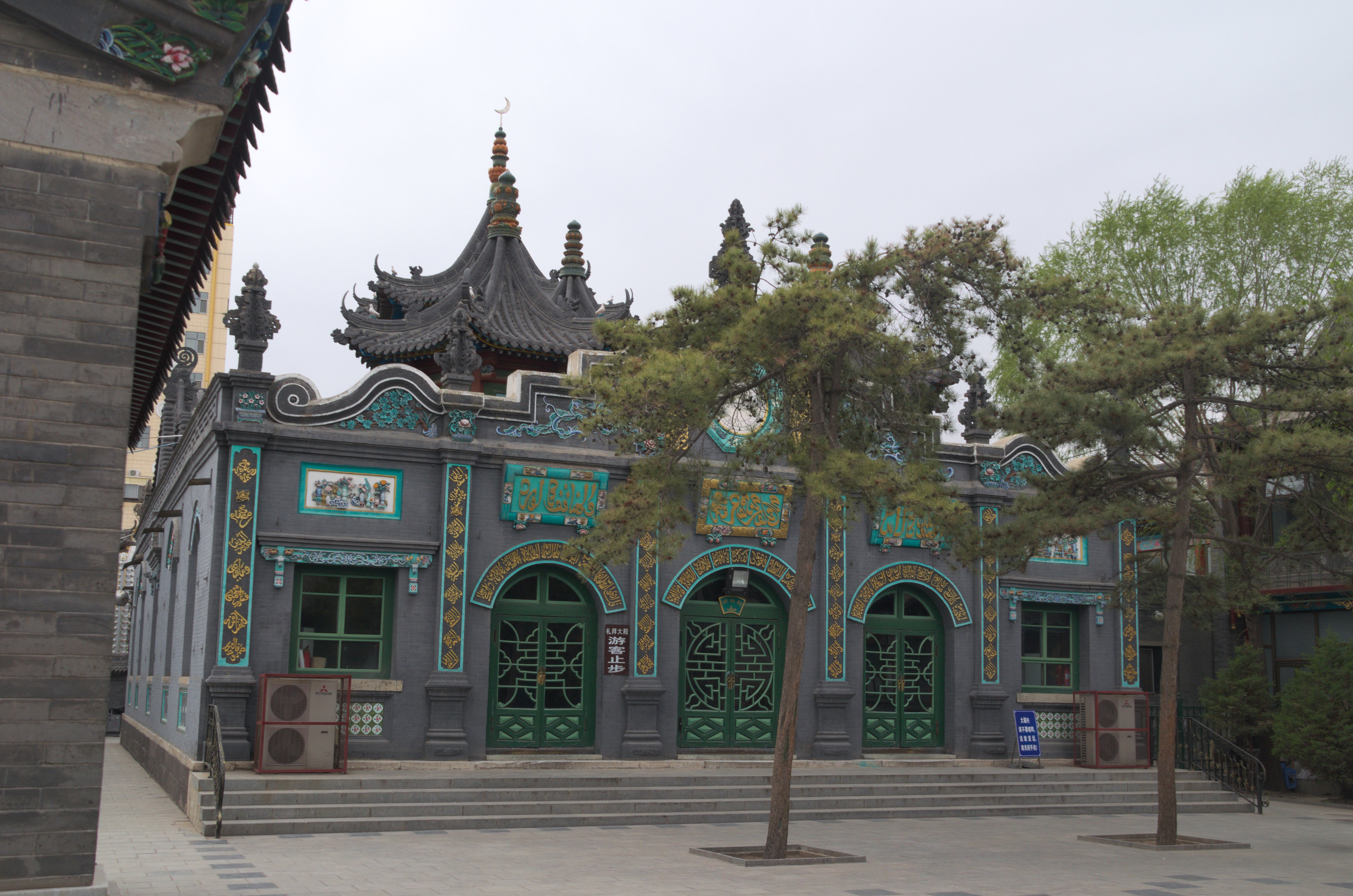

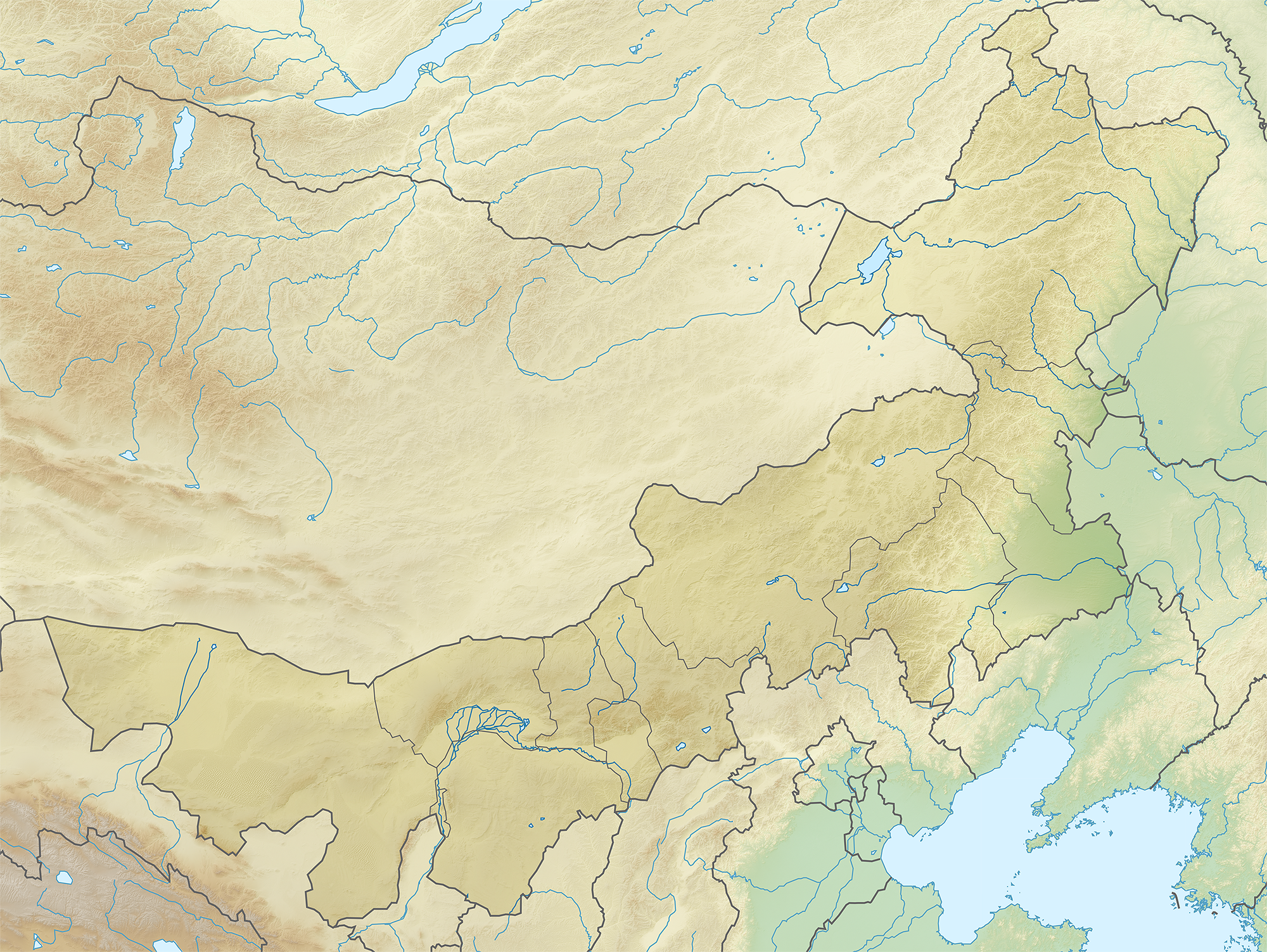
- Location of the mosque in Inner Mongolia

Religion
- Affiliation: Sunni Islam
- Ecclesiastical or organizational status: Mosque
- Status: Active

Location
- Location: 28 Tongdao South Road, Huimin, Hohhot, Inner Mongolia
- Country: China
- Interactive map of Great Mosque of Hohhot
- Coordinates: 40°48′34.8″N 111°39′20.0″E

Architecture
- Type: Mosque
- Style: Chinese; Islamic
- Completed: 1693 CE

Specifications
- Minaret: 1
- Minaret height: 15 m (49 ft)
- Site area: 4,000 m^{2} (43,000 sq ft)
- Materials: Black bricks

Chinese name
- Simplified Chinese: 呼和浩特清真大寺
Transcriptions
Standard Mandarin
- Hanyu Pinyin: Hūhé Hàotè Qīngzhēndàsì

The Great Mosque of Hohhot (Chinese: 呼和浩特清真大寺; pinyin: Hūhé Hàotè Qīngzhēndàsì) is a mosque in Huimin District, Hohhot, in the Inner Mongolia autonomous region of China. It is the oldest and largest mosque in Inner Mongolia.

== History ==
The mosque was constructed in 1693 by the Hui people. It was then renovated in 1789 and 1923.

== Architecture ==
The mosque was designed using Sino-Islamic architecture and built with black bricks. It covers 4,000 square metres (43,000 sq ft) and has a 15-metre-high (49 ft) minaret and a wudu.

The mosque houses a lecture hall and a prayer hall. The mosque contains a notable four-story tower.

== Gallery ==
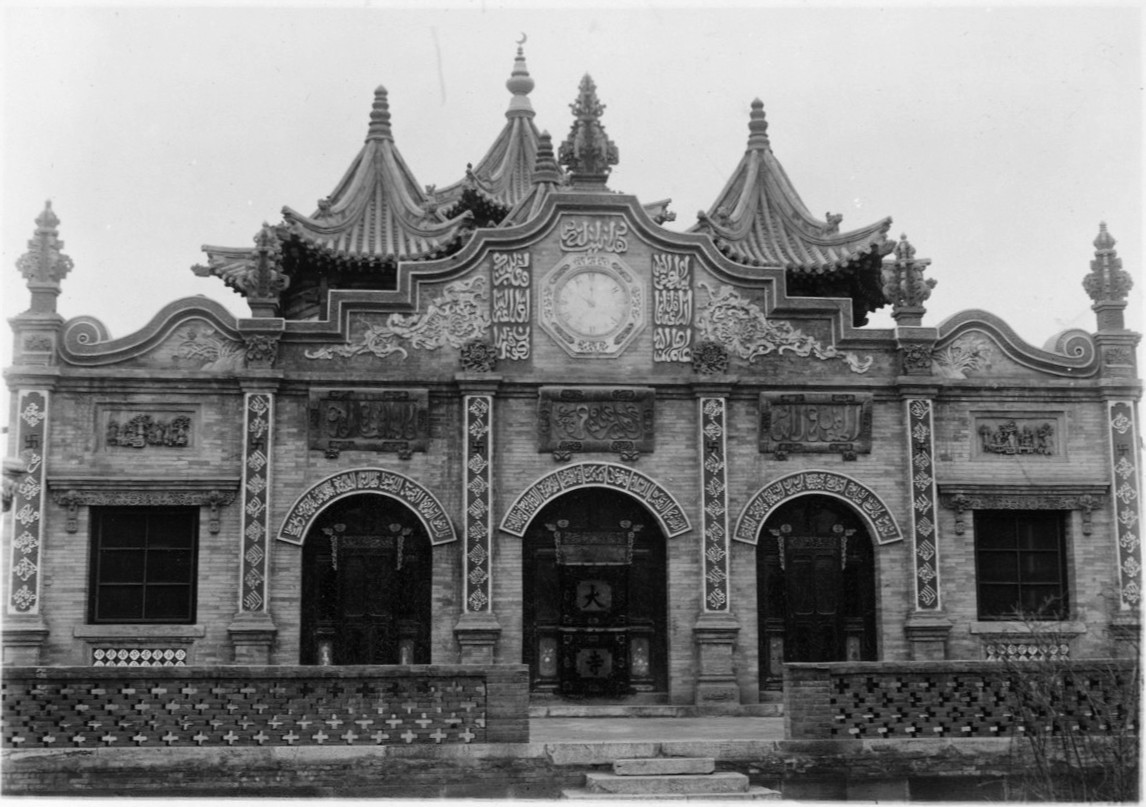
The mosque, c. 1940

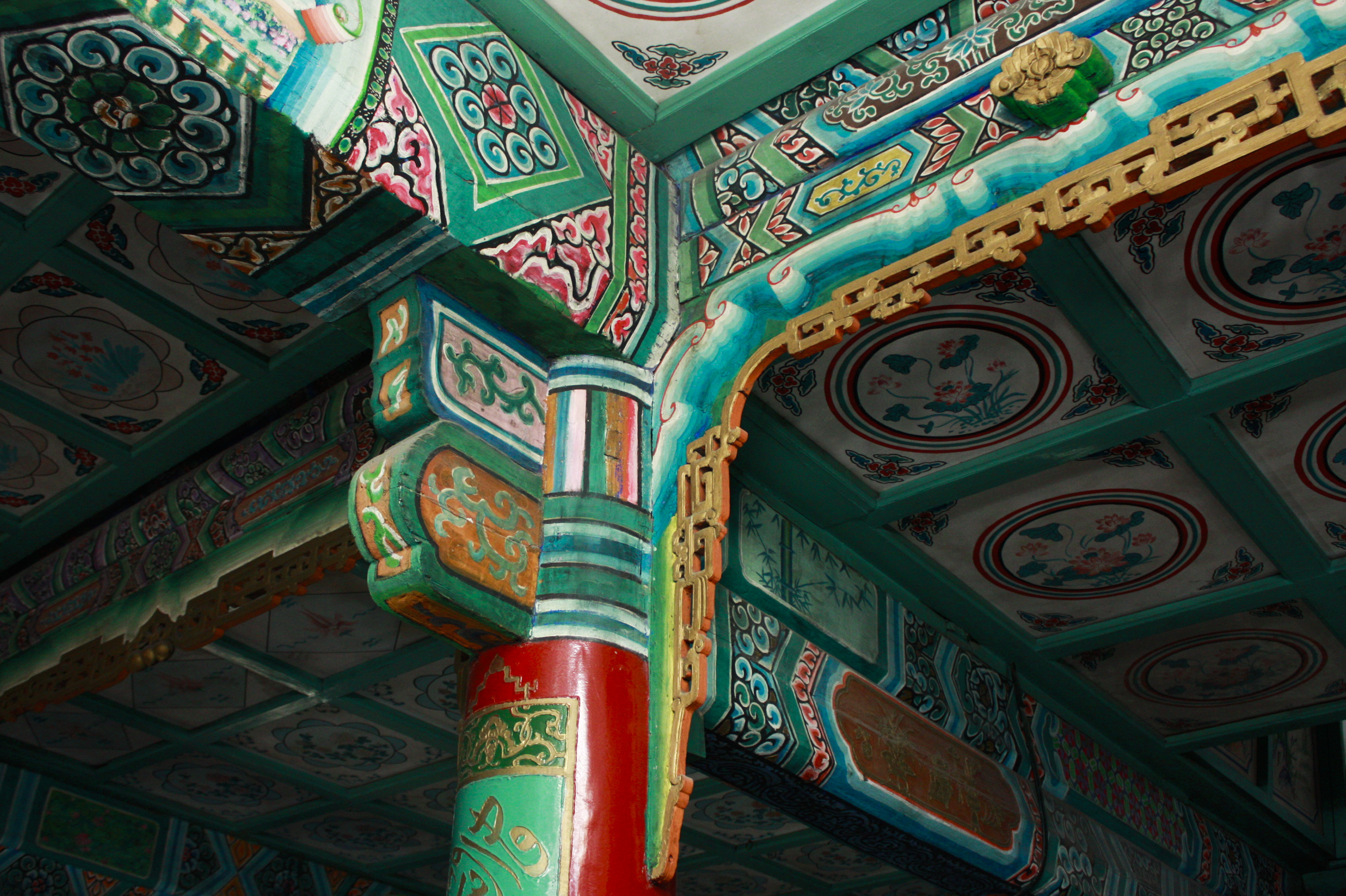
Inside the mosque

== See also ==
- Islam in China
- List of mosques in China
