= Line 1 (Hohhot Metro) =

Metro line in Hohhot, China

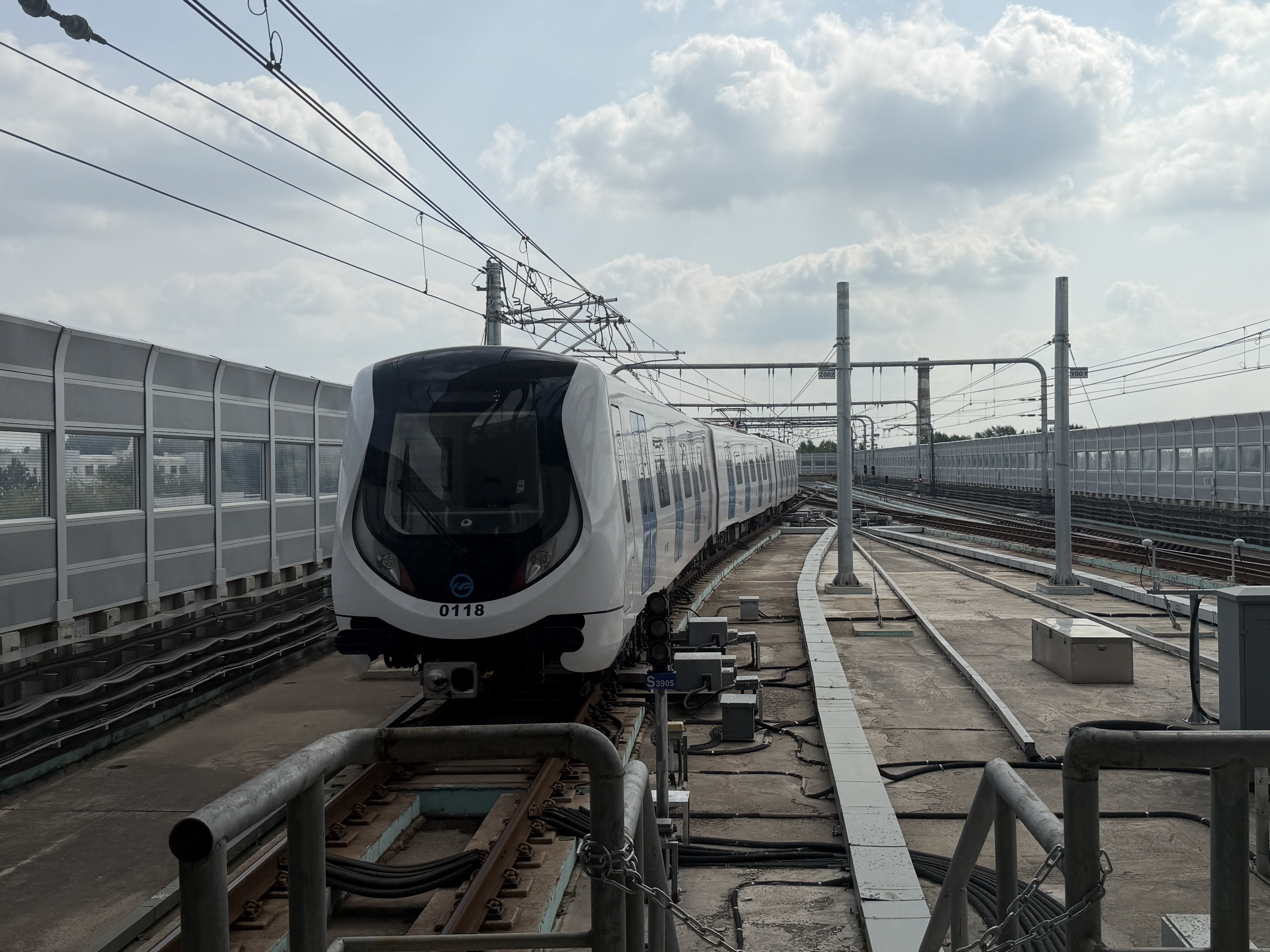
- Line 1 train at Bayan (Airport) Station

Overview
- Status: In operation
- Locale: Hohhot, Inner Mongolia, China
- Termini: Yili Health Valley; Bayan (Airport)
- Stations: 20

Service
- Type: Rapid transit
- System: Hohhot Metro
- Rolling stock: 6-car Type B

History
- Opened: 29 December 2019; 6 years ago

Technical
- Line length: 21.719 km (13.5 mi)
- Character: Underground, Elevated, At-grade
- Track gauge: 1,435 mm (4 ft 8 1/2 in)

Line 1 (Hohhot Metro)

Chinese name
- Simplified Chinese: 呼和浩特地铁1号线
- Traditional Chinese: 呼和浩特地鐵1號線
Transcriptions
Standard Mandarin
- Hanyu Pinyin: Hūhéhàotè Dìtiě Yī Hào Xiàn

Mongolian name
- Mongolian Cyrillic: Хөххотийн Метрийн 1 Номерт Шугам
- Mongolian script: ᠬᠦᠬᠡᠬᠤᠳᠠ ᠶᠢᠨ ᠮᠧᠲ᠋ᠷᠣ᠋ ᠶᠢᠨ ᠑ ᠨᠤᠮᠧᠷᠳᠤ ᠱᠤᠭᠤᠮ

Line 1 of Hohhot Metro is a rapid transit line in Hohhot, Inner Mongolia, China.

The first phase of Line 1 is 21.719 km (13.5 mi) long. It was opened on 29 December 2019. The color for Line 1 is red.

== Opening timeline ==
| Segment | Commencement | Length | Station(s) | Name |
|---|---|---|---|---|
| Yili Health Valley — Bayan (Airport) | 29 December 2019; 6 years ago | 21.719 km (13.5 mi) | 20 | Phase 1 |

== Stations ==
| Station name | | | Connections | Distance km | Location |
| English | Chinese | Mongolian | Connections | Distance km | Location |
|---|---|---|---|---|---|
| Yili Health Valley | 伊利健康谷 | ᠢᠯᠢ ᠡᠷᠡᠭᠦᠯ ᠮᠡᠨᠳᠦ ᠶᠢᠨ ᠵᠢᠯᠠᠭ᠎ᠠ | | | Tumed Left Banner |
| Xi'erhuanlu | 西二环路 | ᠪᠠᠷᠠᠭᠤᠨ ᠬᠣᠶᠠᠳᠤᠭᠠᠷ ᠲᠣᠭᠣᠷᠢᠭ ᠵᠠᠮ | | | Huimin |
| Kongjiaying | 孔家营 | ᠺᠦᠩ ᠵᠢᠶᠠ ᠶᠢᠩ | | | Huimin |
| Hugangnanlu (Note: Was Hugangdonglu until 31 October 2023) | 呼钢南路 | ᠬᠥᠬᠡᠬᠣᠲᠠ ᠶᠢᠨ ᠪᠣᠯᠣᠳ ᠲᠡᠮᠦᠷ ᠦ᠋ᠨ ᠡᠮᠦᠨ᠎ᠡ ᠵᠠᠮ | | | Huimin |
| Xilongwangmiao | 西龙王庙 | ᠪᠠᠷᠠᠭᠤᠨ ᠯᠤᠤᠰ ᠤᠨ ᠰᠦᠮ᠎ᠡ | | | Huimin |
| Wulanfu Memorial Hall | 乌兰夫纪念馆 | ᠤᠯᠠᠭᠠᠨᠬᠦᠦ ᠶᠢᠨ ᠳᠤᠷᠠᠰᠬᠠᠯ ᠤᠨ ᠣᠷᠳᠣᠨ | | | Huimin |
| Affiliated Hospital | 附属医院 | ᠬᠠᠷᠢᠶᠠᠲᠤ ᠡᠮᠨᠡᠯᠭᠡ ᠶᠢᠨ ᠬᠣᠷᠢᠶ᠎ᠠ | | | Huimin |
| Xinhua Square | 新华广场 | ᠰᠢᠨᠬᠤᠸᠠ ᠲᠠᠯᠠᠪᠠᠢ | 2 | | Huimin/Xincheng |
| People's Hall | 人民会堂 | ᠠᠷᠠᠳ ᠤᠨ ᠬᠤᠷᠠᠯ ᠤᠨ ᠲᠠᠩᠬᠢᠮ | | | Xincheng |
| Jiangjunyashu | 将军衙署 | ᠵᠠᠩᠵᠤᠨ ᠤ ᠶᠠᠮᠤᠨ | | | Xincheng |
| Arts College | 艺术学院 | ᠤᠷᠠᠯᠢᠭ ᠤᠨ ᠳᠡᠭᠡᠳᠦ ᠰᠤᠷᠭᠠᠭᠤᠯᠢ | | | Saihan/Xincheng |
| Dongyinglu | 东影路 | ᠳ᠋ᠦᠩ ᠶᠢᠩ ᠵᠠᠮ | | | Saihan/Xincheng |
| Inner Mongolia Exhibition Hall | 内蒙古展览馆 | ᠥᠪᠥᠷ ᠮᠣᠩᠭᠣᠯ ᠤᠨ ᠦᠵᠡᠰᠬᠦᠯᠡᠩ ᠦᠨ ᠣᠷᠳᠣᠨ | | | Saihan/Xincheng |
| Inner Mongolia Museum | 内蒙古博物院 | ᠥᠪᠥᠷ ᠮᠣᠩᠭᠣᠯ ᠤᠨ ᠮᠦᠽᠧᠢ | | | Saihan/Xincheng |
| City Government | 市政府 | ᠬᠣᠲᠠ ᠶᠢᠨ ᠵᠠᠰᠠᠭ ᠤᠨ ᠣᠷᠳᠣᠨ | | | Saihan/Xincheng |
| Hohhot East Railway Station | 呼和浩特东站 | ᠬᠥᠬᠡᠬᠣᠲᠠ ᠶᠢᠨ ᠵᠡᠭᠦᠨ ᠥᠷᠲᠡᠭᠡ | NDC | | Xincheng |
| Houbutaqi | 后不塔气 | ᠬᠣᠢᠲᠤ ᠪᠤᠲᠠᠴᠢ | | | Saihan/Xincheng |
| Shilandai | 什兰岱 | ᠰᠢᠯᠠᠷᠳᠠᠢ | | | Saihan |
| Baita West | 白塔西 | ᠴᠠᠭᠠᠨ ᠰᠤᠪᠤᠷᠭ᠎ᠠ ᠶᠢᠨ ᠪᠠᠷᠠᠭᠤᠨ | HET | | Saihan |
| Bayan (Airport) | 坝堰（机场） | ᠪᠠᠶᠠᠨ ( ᠨᠢᠰᠬᠡᠯ ᠦᠨ ᠪᠠᠭᠤᠳᠠᠯ ) | HET | | Saihan |
