= Yili Health Valley station =

Station of Hohhot Metro

Yili Health Valley 伊利健康谷站
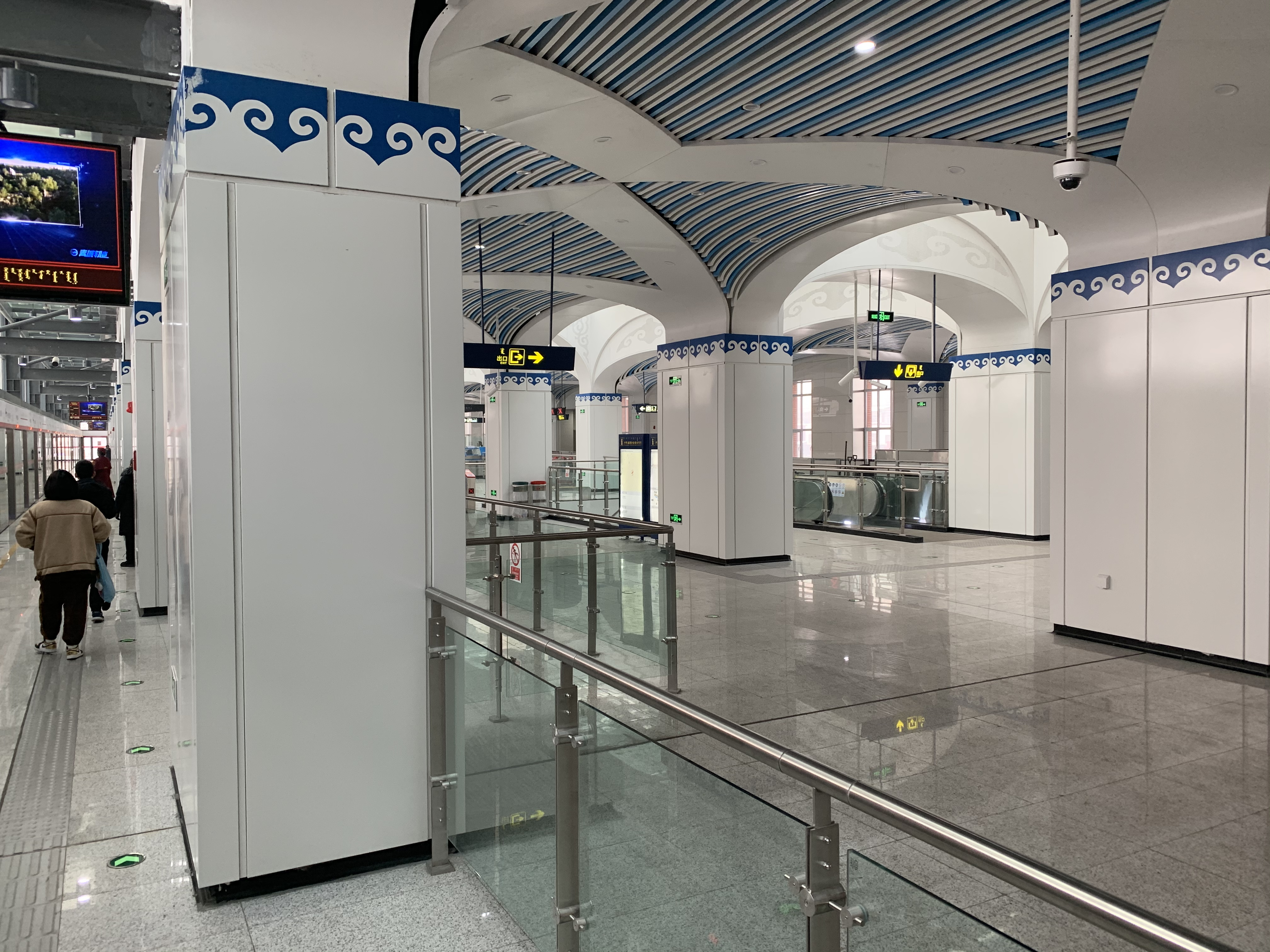
- Platform and station hall
- ᠢᠯᠢ ᠡᠷᠡᠭᠦᠯ ᠮᠡᠨᠳᠦ ᠶᠢᠨ ᠵᠢᠯᠠᠭ᠎ᠠ

General information
- Location: Tumed Left Banner, Hohhot, Inner Mongolia, China
- Coordinates: 40.783603°N 111.568375°E
- Line: Line 1

History
- Opened: 29 December 2019; 6 years ago

Services
Preceding station	Hohhot Metro	Following station
Terminus	Line 1	Xi'erhuanlu towards Bayan (Airport)
Location

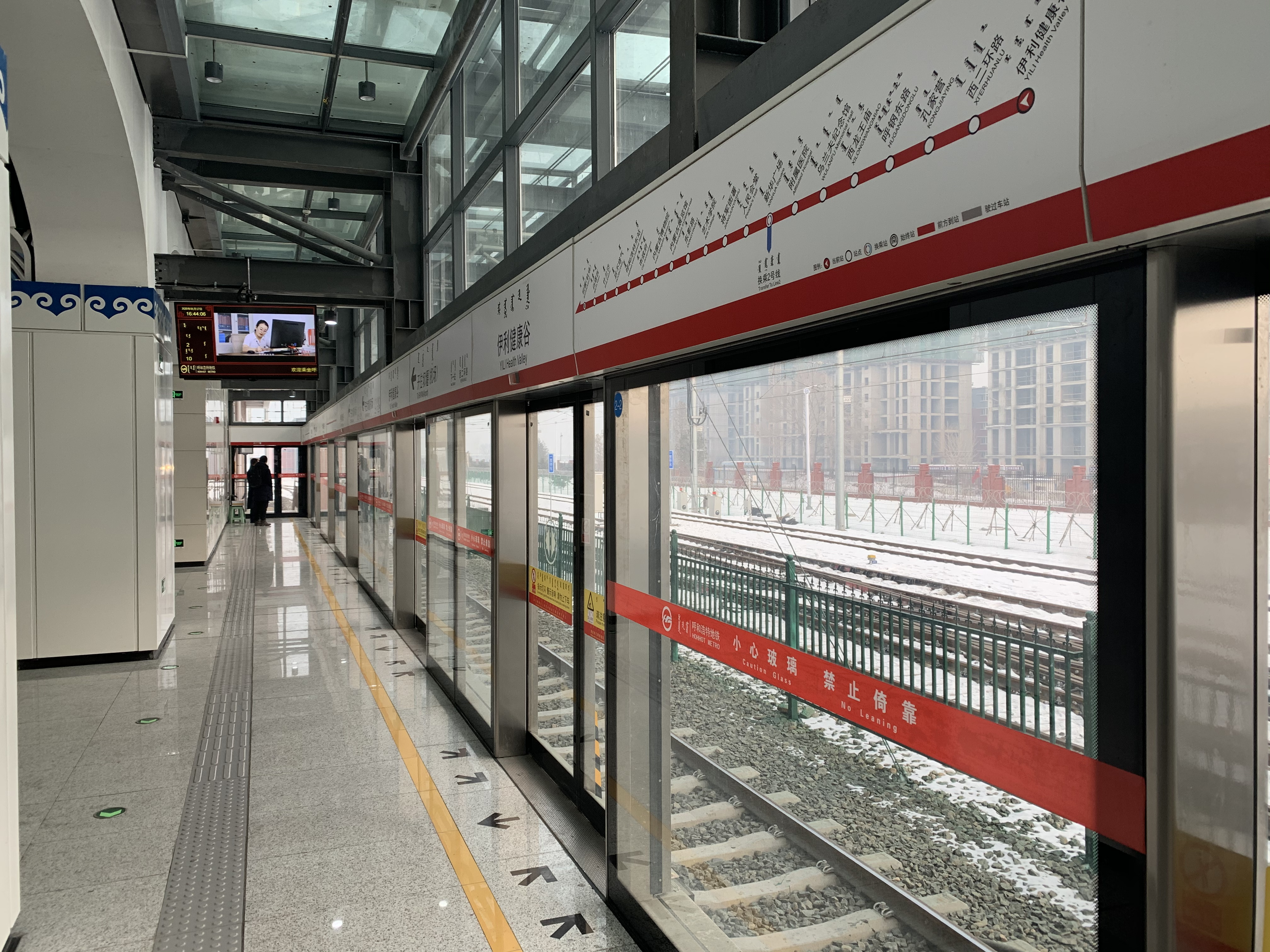
Platform

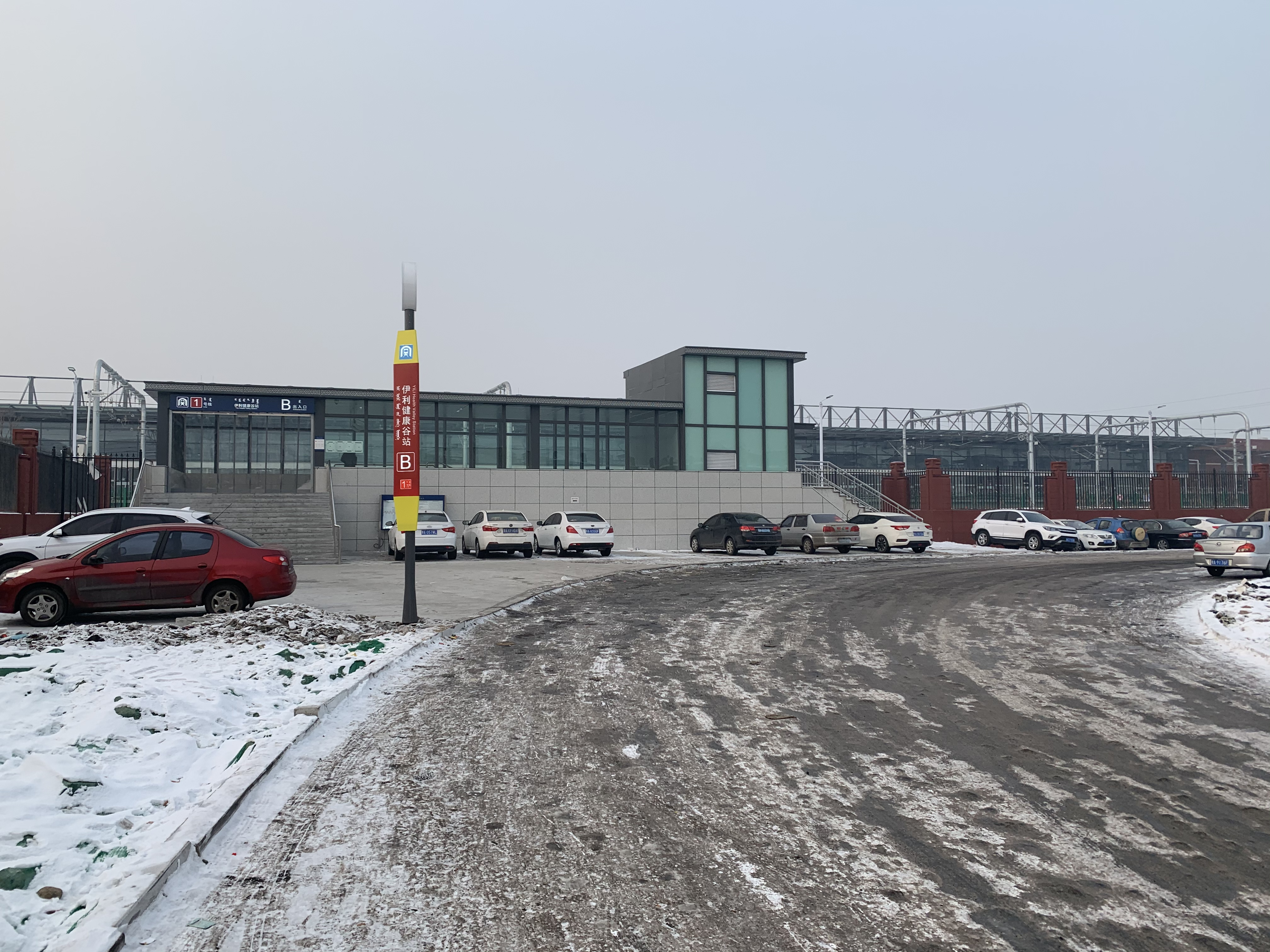
Exit B of Yili Health Valley station

Yili Health Valley station (Chinese: 伊利健康谷站; pinyin: Yīlì Jiànkāng Gǔ zhàn) is a station on Line 1 of the Hohhot Metro in Hohhot, Inner Mongolia, China. The station was called Sanjianfang station (Chinese: 三间房站; pinyin: Sānjiānfáng zhàn) during planning and construction. It serves as the western terminus of the line and opened on 29 December 2019. It was named for the nearby Yili Health Valley.
