= Bayan (Airport) station =

Metro station in Hohhot, China

Bayan (Airport) 坝堰（机场）站
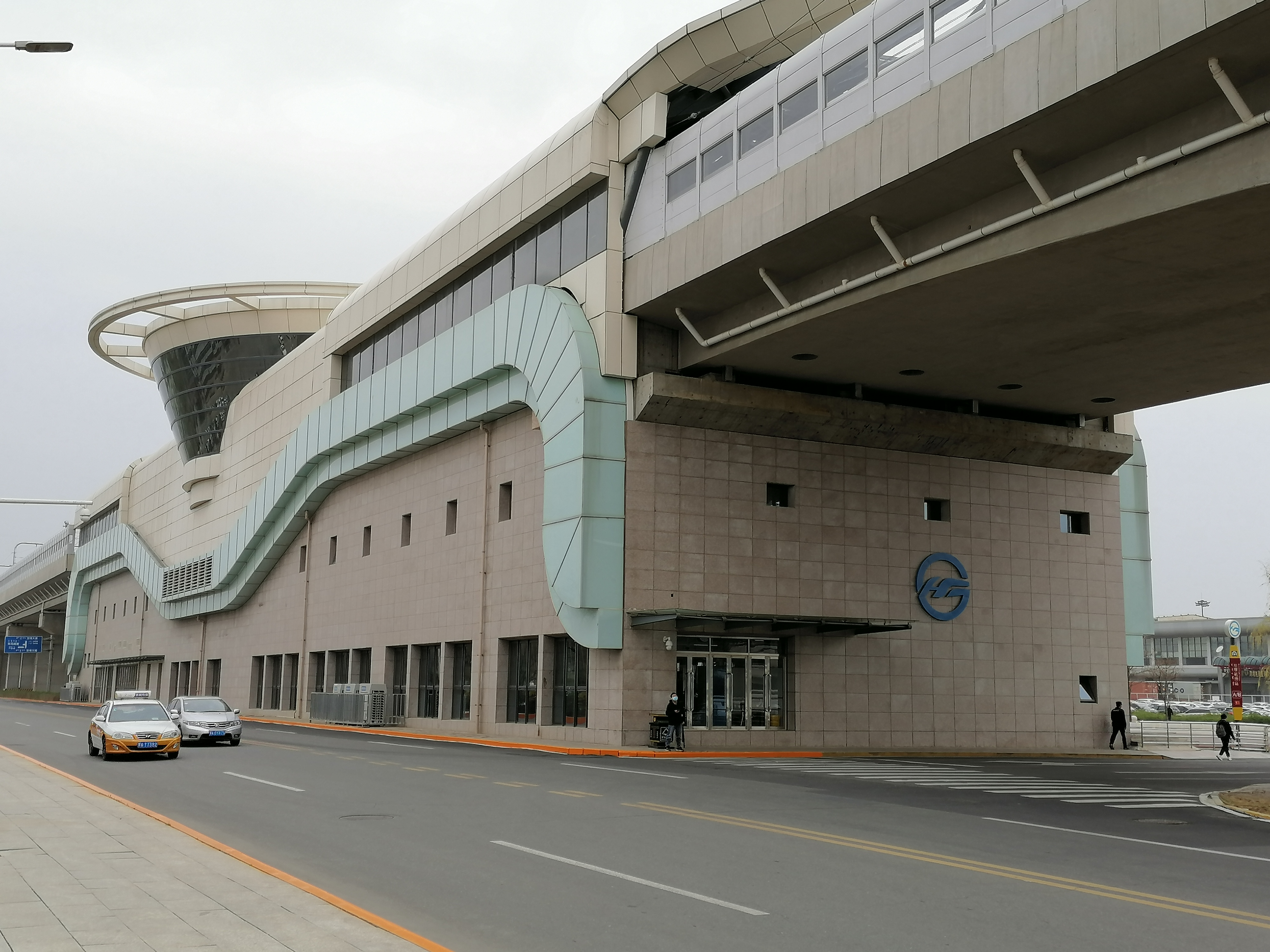
- ᠪᠠᠶᠠᠨ ( ᠨᠢᠰᠬᠡᠯ ᠦᠨ ᠪᠠᠭᠤᠳᠠᠯ )

General information
- Location: Saihan District, Hohhot, Inner Mongolia, China
- Coordinates: 40.856383°N 111.817737°E
- Line: Line 1

History
- Opened: 29 December 2019; 6 years ago

Services
Preceding station	Hohhot Metro	Following station
Baita West towards Yili Health Valley	Line 1	Terminus
Location

Bayan (Airport) station (Chinese: 坝堰（机场）站; pinyin: Bàyàn (Jīchǎng) zhàn) is a station on Line 1 of the Hohhot Metro and opened on 29 December 2019. It serves the nearby domestic terminal of Hohhot Baita International Airport and Bayan Village, and is the eastern terminus of the line.
