= Dazhao Temple =

Dazhao Temple may refer to:

- Jokhang, Lhasa
- Dazhao Temple (Hohhot)
