= Xilitu Zhao =

Shiretu Juu ᠰᠢᠷᠡᠭᠲᠤ ᠵᠤᠤ
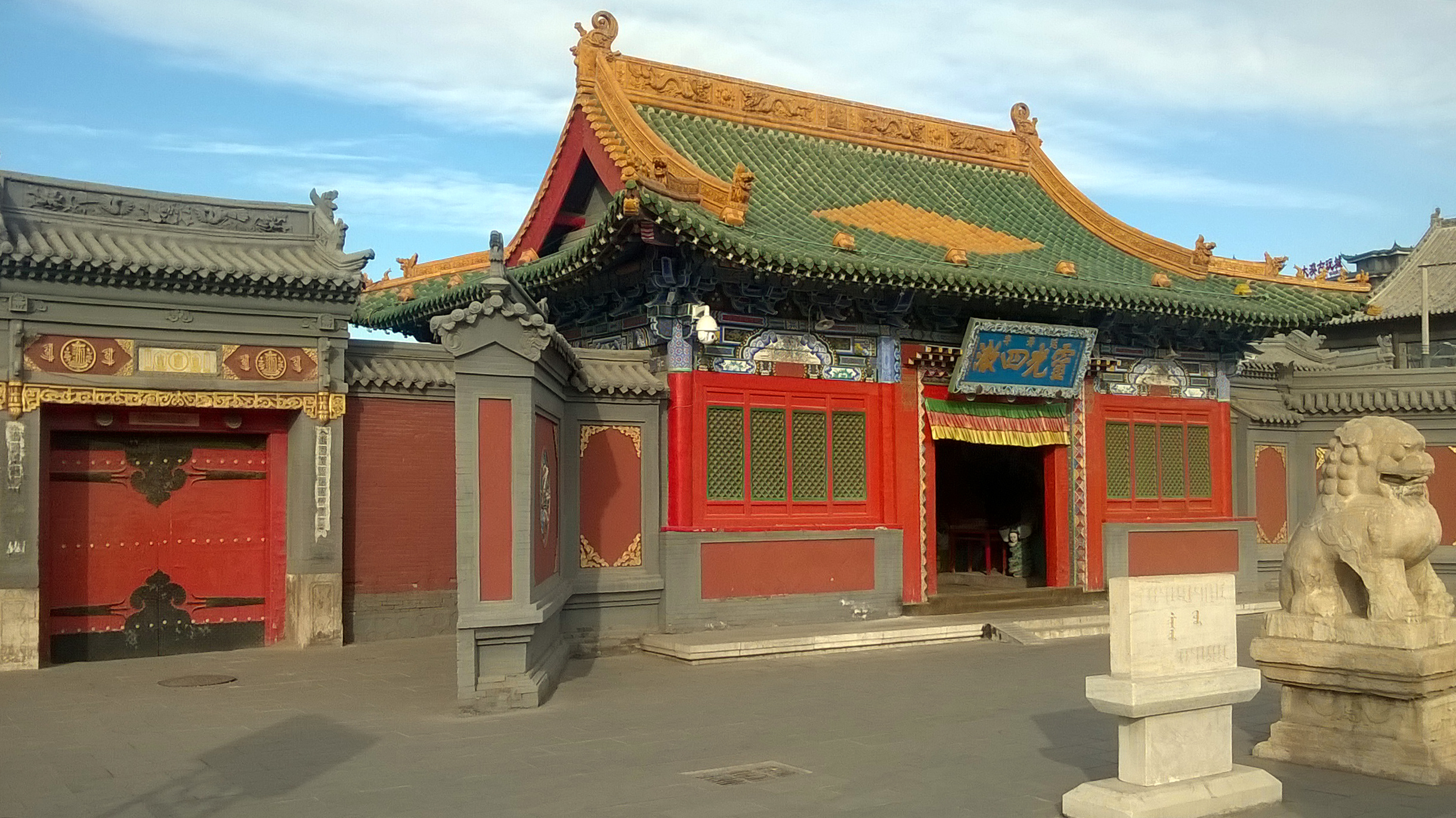
- 席力图召

Religion
- Affiliation: Tibetan Buddhism
- Sect: Gelug

Location
- Location: Hohhot, Inner Mongolia, China
- Interactive map of Shiretu Juu ᠰᠢᠷᠡᠭᠲᠤ ᠵᠤᠤ

Architecture
- Founder: The son of the Altan Khan
- Established: 1585

The Xilitu Zhao (when written in Chinese-character Buddhist syllabary 席力圖召), also known as Shiretu Juu or by formal Chinese name Yanshou Temple (延壽寺) is an ancient Tibetan Buddhist monastery of the Gelugpa sect in Hohhot, the capital of Inner Mongolia, China. The original temple was built in 1585, but was later destroyed by fire and rebuilt in the 19th century. It is located East of Dana Street in the Yuquan District, just across the road from the Da Zhao Temple.

The monastery which covers an area of 13,160 square meters is a distinct blend of Han and Tibetan architecture, reflecting its intercultural influences. This temple has acted as the official residence of a Living Buddha, the English translation of the Chinese term for an incarnate lama, since 1735 and remains so this day, housing the 11th Grand Living Buddha. The complex suffered damage during the Cultural Revolution (1966–1976) but has since been completely restored. While open to the public, the temple remains an active place of worship for Mongol monks and their disciples.
