= China Adolescents Science & Technology Innovation Contest =

National science competition in China

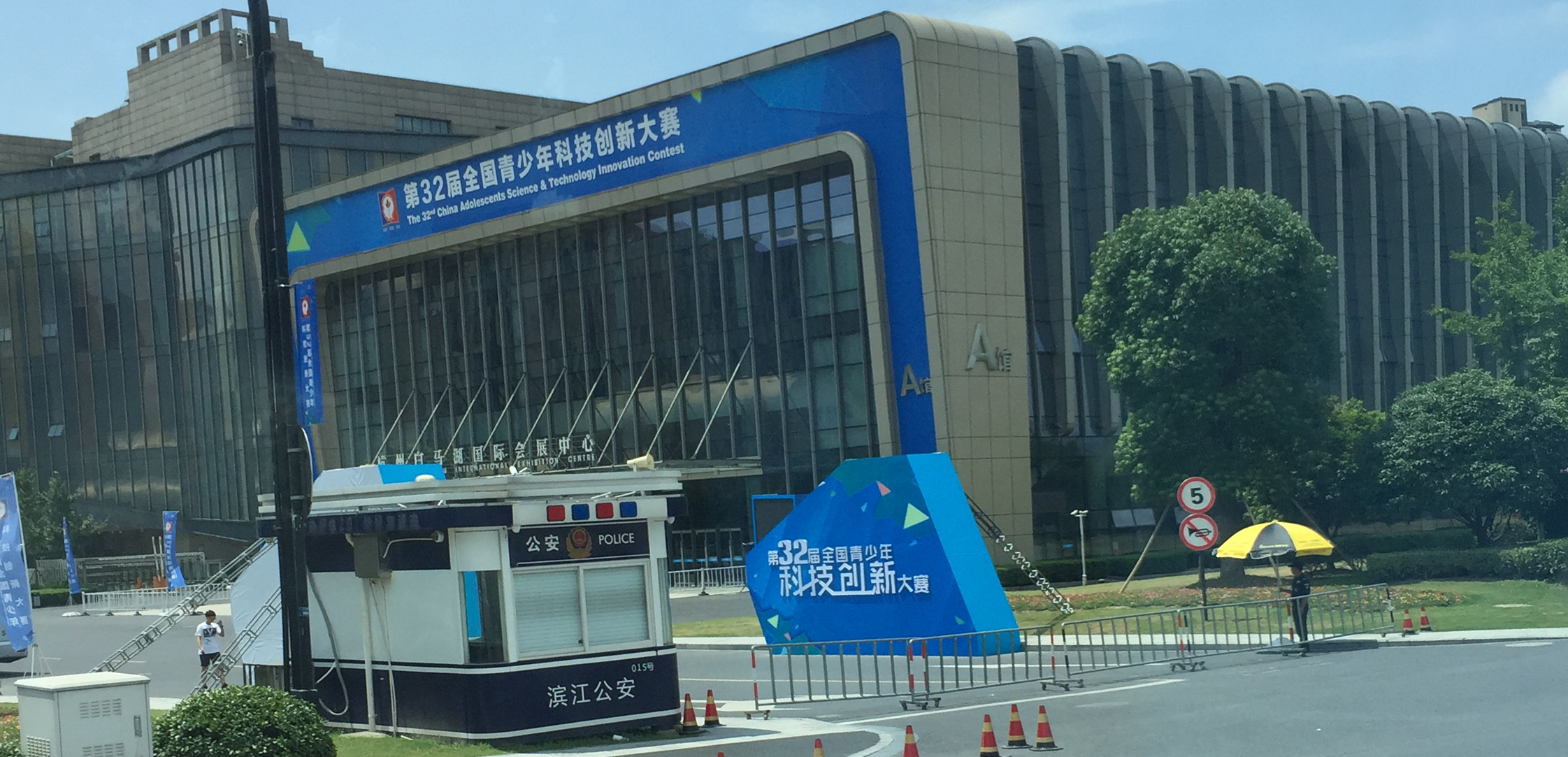
The 32nd CASTIC at Hangzhou, Zhejiang, China

China Adolescents Science & Technology Innovation Contest (CASTIC; Chinese: 全国青少年科技创新大赛) is one of the biggest national science competitions in China held by organizations including China Association for Science and Technology and Ministry of Education of the People's Republic of China. Every year, more than 10 million students from all parts of China submit their projects in local-level competitions and up to 500 projects are eventually selected for the CASTIC. A few top projects are further selected to participate in competitions including Broadcom Masters International, Intel International Science and Engineering Fair, or European Union Contest for Young Scientists.

== Location ==
=== Before 2002 ===
China Adolescents Innovation Contest and Science Seminar

- 1st (1982): Shanghai
- 2nd (1984): Kunming, Yunnan
- 3rd (1986): Lanzhou, Gansu
- 4th (1988): Beijing
- 5th (1990): Chengdu, Sichuan
- 6th (1992): Shenyang, Liaoning
- 7th (1994): Nanning, Guangxi
- 8th (1996): Tianjin
- 9th (1998): Hong Kong
- 10th (2000): Hefei, Anhui

China Adolescents Biology and Environmental Science Practice Project

- 1st (1991): Beijing
- 2nd (1993): Shanghai
- 3rd (1995): Changsha, Hunan
- 4th (1997): Xining, Qinghai
- 5th (1999): Hohhot, Inner Mongolia
- 6th (2001): Fuzhou, Fujian

=== After 2002 ===
In 2002, the biennial China Adolescents Innovation Contest and Science Seminar (Chinese: 全国青少年发明创造比赛和科学讨论会) and the biennial China Adolescents Biology and Environmental Science Practice Project (Chinese: 全国青少年生物与环境科学实践活动) were combined into CASTIC.

- 17th (2002): Zhengzhou, Henan
- 18th (2003): Lanzhou, Gansu
- 19th (2004): Chengdu, Sichuan
- 20th (2005): Beijing
- 21st (2006): Macau
- 22nd (2007): Kunming, Yunnan
- 23rd (2008): Ürümqi, Xinjiang
- 24th (2009): Jinan, Shandong
- 25th (2010): Guangzhou, Guangdong
- 26th (2011): Hohhot, Inner Mongolia
- 27th (2012): Yinchuan, Ningxia
- 28th (2013): Nanjing, Jiangsu
- 29th (2014): Beijing
- 30th (2015): Hong Kong
- 31st (2016): Shanghai
- 32nd (2017): Hangzhou, Zhejiang
- 33rd (2018): Chongqing
- 34th (2019): Macau
