= Inner Mongolia Police Professional College =

- 内蒙古警察职业学院
- Type: Public
- Established: 1948
- Location: Hohhot, Inner Mongolia, China
- Website: Official website at the Wayback Machine (archived 13 March 2023)

The Inner Mongolia Police Professional College (simplified Chinese: 内蒙古警察职业学院; traditional Chinese: 內蒙古警察職業學院) is a law enforcement education college in the Chinese city of Hohhot.

== History ==
The school's predecessor was the Inner Mongolia Public Security Cadre People's Police School (Chinese: 内蒙古公安干部人民警察学校), which was established in 1948. The school's current iteration was formed in April 2001. The Inner Mongolia Judicial School (Chinese: 内蒙古司法学校) merged into the school in October 2002. The Inner Mongolia Autonomous Region Public Security Department (Chinese: 自治区公安厅) oversees the school's staff and curriculum.

The Inner Mongolia Police Professional College is the sole law enforcement school in Inner Mongolia. It is a three-year junior college. In 2005, the Ministry of Education gave the school a "yellow card" (Chinese: 黄牌) that limited the number of students the school could enroll since it failed to fulfill national standards. By 2007, it had over 30,000 alumni in law and public security.

500 students attended the school in 2001. 1,000 students attended the school in each year between 2002 and 2004. After 2004, enrollment dropped to 500 students per year. By 2008, 80% of students graduating from the school did not have jobs by 2008 since Inner Mongolia's last significant police recruitment exam took place in 2003. Although there were civil service exams in the area after 2003, students from the college largely failed the exams as they were outperformed by students from nearby universities. The college chose not to accept students in 2008 owing to the school's having low enrollment and alumni's having difficult employment prospects.
