= Zhangjiakou–Hohhot dialect =

Jin dialect

Zhangjiakou–Hohhot
- 張呼片, 此地话
- Native to: China
- Region: Inner Mongolia, Zhangjiakou
- Language family: Sino-Tibetan: Sinitic; Chinese; Jin; Zhangjiakou–Hohhot
- Writing system: Chinese characters

Language codes
- ISO 639-3: –
- Glottolog: huhe1234 Huhehaote
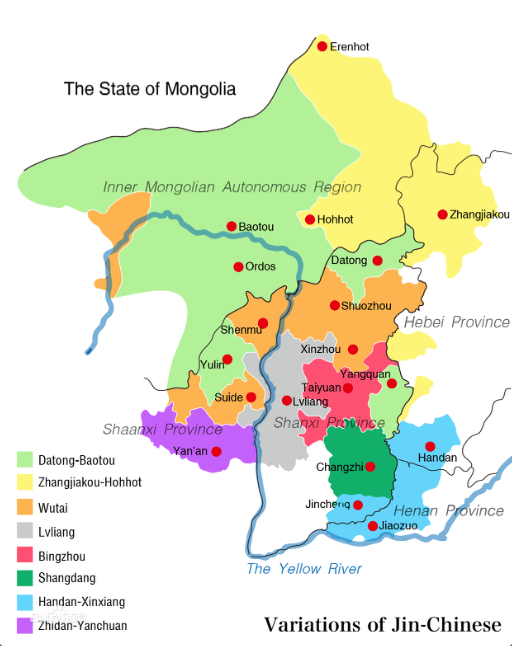
- Location of the Zhangjiakou–Hohhot dialect (yellow) spoken within China

Zhangjiakou–Hohhot (simplified Chinese: 张呼片; traditional Chinese: 張呼片; pinyin: Zhānghūpiàn) is a dialect of Jin, one of the principal varieties of Chinese. It is colloquially referred to by native speakers as Cǐdìhuà (此地话; lit.: local speech, or "this-place speech"). It is spoken in the city of Hohhot, in Inner Mongolia, and Zhangjiakou in Hebei Province in China. One of its sub-branches is Hohhot dialect (simplified Chinese: 呼和浩特话; traditional Chinese: 呼和浩特話; pinyin: Hūhéhàotèhuà), which is also locally referred as Hūshìhuà (呼市话; lit. Hu-city speech). The other sub-branch is the Zhangjiakou dialect (simplified Chinese: 张家口话; traditional Chinese: 張家口話; pinyin: Zhāngjiākǒuhuà).

There is notable dialectal variation within the two cities. People in the Jiucheng area (Yuquan District), especially the Muslim Hui minority, speak a dialect very similar to what is heard in neighbouring Shanxi province and is undoubtedly a branch of the Jin linguistic group. The Mandarin dialect in Xincheng District is a branched combination of the Jin, Hebei dialect, Northeastern Mandarin, and elements of the Manchu language, caused by the migration patterns to the region. It has thus created a distinct linguistic style. The two spoken forms of the Hohhot dialect are only partially intelligible to each other.

Like most Jin dialects, the Jiucheng Hohhot dialect uses the glottal stop and is mutually intelligible with many dialects in neighboring Shanxi. In its full-fledged form, however, it is only partially intelligible with Standard Chinese. Arguably the most eccentric sound is the "nge" sound used to express "I". Many expressions in the dialect have crossed over itself with the Mandarin taught in schools to create "Hohhot Mandarin", or what is commonly heard on the street.

Notable features of the Hohhot dialect include:

- A special intonation for yes–no questions, which is characterized by a prolonged contour at the end of the sentence.
- Mandarin completive "ba" (吧) is often changed into "và" (哇) especially in suggestions.
- "ya" (呀) is used at the end of a sentence to form future tense.
- Renjia (人家), an expression used to refer to someone in third person, is pronounced "niá".
- The word that corresponds to the Mandarin "wǒ" ("I") is pronounced "é" or "wě", which is possibly a weak form of the "nge" form. A vulgar slang term for "I' is "yé 爷 ", which is used mostly by less well-educated men, and those who want to sound tough and manly.
- Notable aspiration of p, t, and k sounds.

The above elements are generally seen in the Jin sub-branch of the "raw" Hohhot dialect, which has its own exclusive elements:

- The absence of the "zh", "ch", and "sh" sounds. They are respectively changed into "z", "c" and "s".
- The Mandarin "r" is non-existent. It is replaced with a soft "z" sound.
- "What", (什么 Shénma), is generally pronounced "seng", or "sheng" by local people.
- Na-li, the expression for "over there" is often pronounced "na-ha-r".

== Variation ==
The dialect spoken in Wuchuan County, about 60 km north of the city, has a recognizably different flavour. The same applies to the dialect in Siziwang Banner. The dialect around Tumed Left Banner, west of the city, is significantly different phonologically, but lexically similar. In Zhangjiakou, Hebei, however, the dialect seems relatively similar and has little variation.
