= Residence of Gurun Princess Kejing =

- 清固倫恪靖公主府
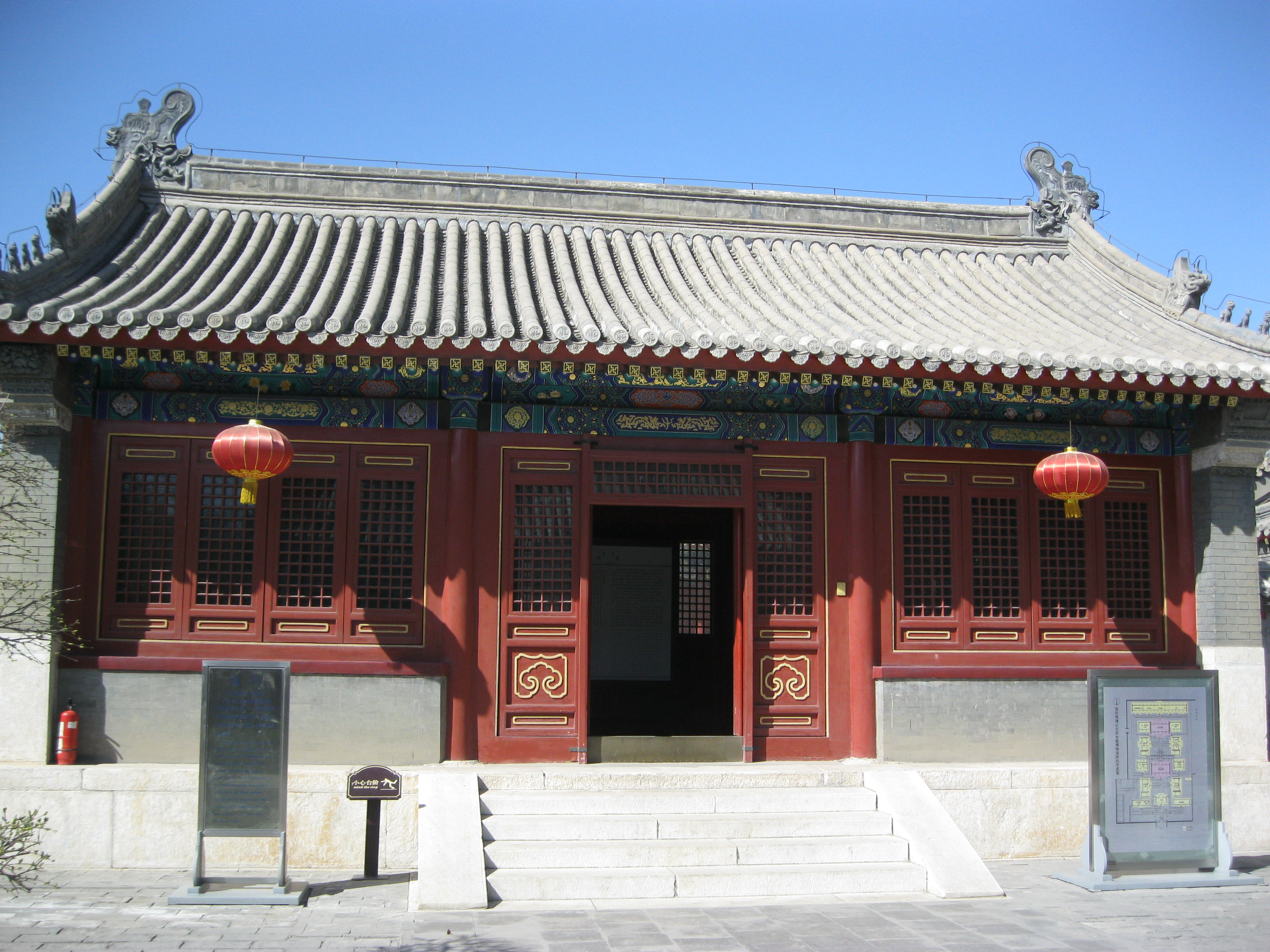
- Main hall of the Residence of Gurun Princess Kejing

- Location within Inner Mongolia Location within China
- Established: 1990
- Location: 62 Tongdao North Road, Xincheng, Hohhot, China
- Coordinates: 40.83699°N 111.64766°E
- Type: City museum, Historic site

The Residence of Gurun Princess Kejing (Chinese: 清固倫恪靖公主府; pinyin: Qīng gùlún kèjìng gōngzhǔ fǔ) is a Qing dynasty courtyard house in Inner Mongolia, China. It currently houses the Hohhot Municipal Museum (Chinese: 呼和浩特市博物館; pinyin: Hūhéhàotè shì bówùguǎn). It is listed as a Major Historical and Cultural Site Protected at the National Level.

== History ==
The mansion was where Gurun Princess Kejing lived after her marriage to a member of the Mongolian Borjigin clan. The Dzungar–Qing Wars meant that the territory now known as Mongolia was unsafe for a Qing princess, so the Kangxi Emperor decreed that she should reside in Hohhot, then known as Guihua City (Chinese: 归化城). The site for the residence was selected in 1703, and all materials and labour for its construction came from the area surrounding Hohhot. The residence was completed in 1705.

The residence was occupied by descendants of Gurun Princess Kejing until the 20th century. In 1923, it was taken over and used by Hohhot Municipal Normal School. The Hohhot Museum acquired the complex in 1990.

In 2001, the complex was listed as a Major Historical and Cultural Site Protected at the National Level by the State Administration of Cultural Heritage.

== Structure ==
The residential complex measures 180m from north to south, 63m from east to west. It is laid out symmetrically east-west, with the central axis from south to north featuring a spirit screen, main entrance, ceremonial entrance, main hall (called Jingyi Tang 靜宜堂), a house-style passage (Chinese: 垂花門; pinyin: chuíhuā mén), bedchamber, and a rear building (Chinese: 後罩房; pinyin: hòuzhào fáng). Each of the four internal courtyards and buildings along the central axis is flanked by opposing side buildings.

The building is only one storey high and the walls are very thick to protect against the cold winters experienced in Hohhot. The main hall has traditional latticed windows, whilst the bedchamber has windows set high into the wall that can be opened.

== Gallery ==
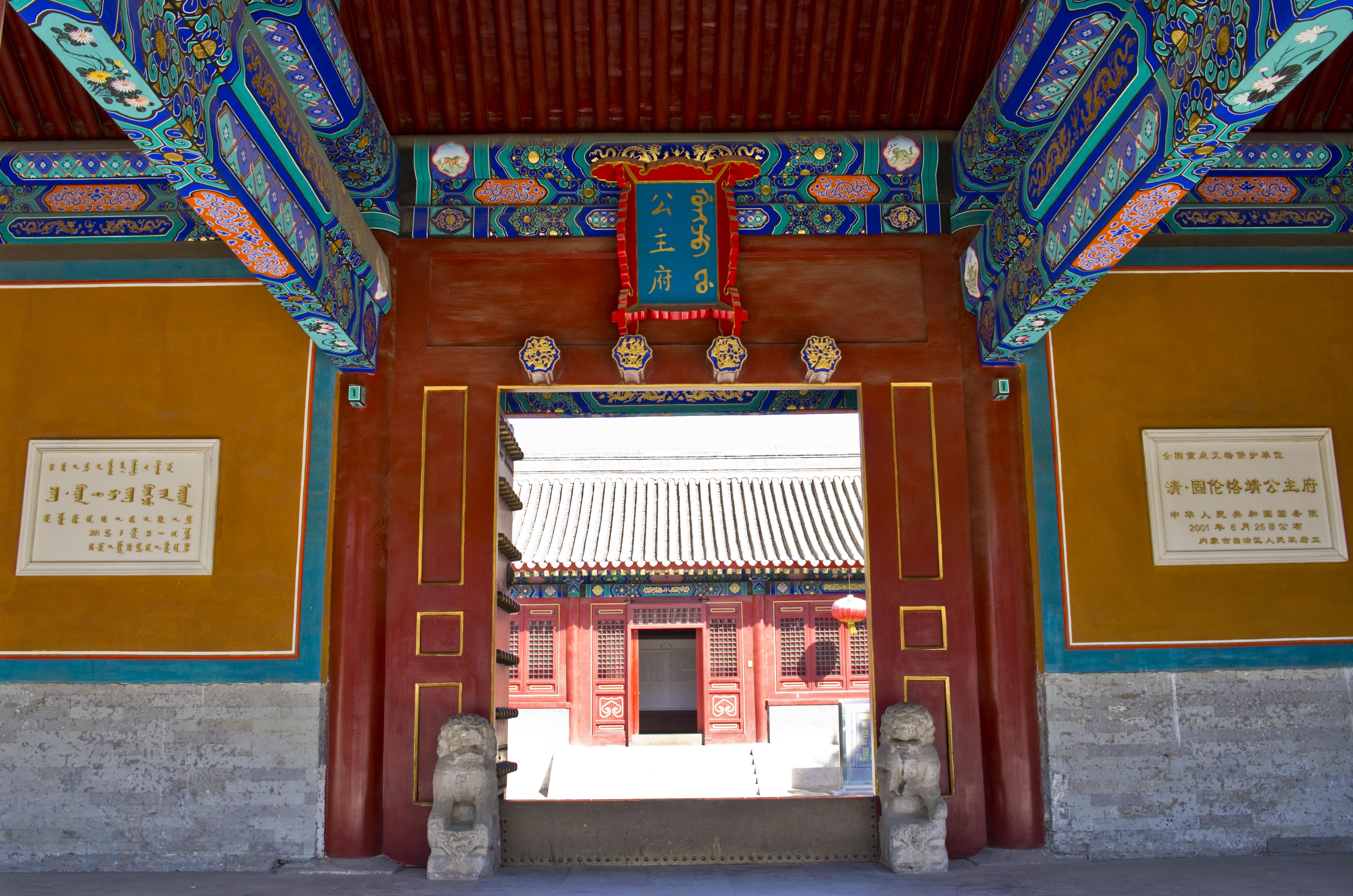
Main entrance

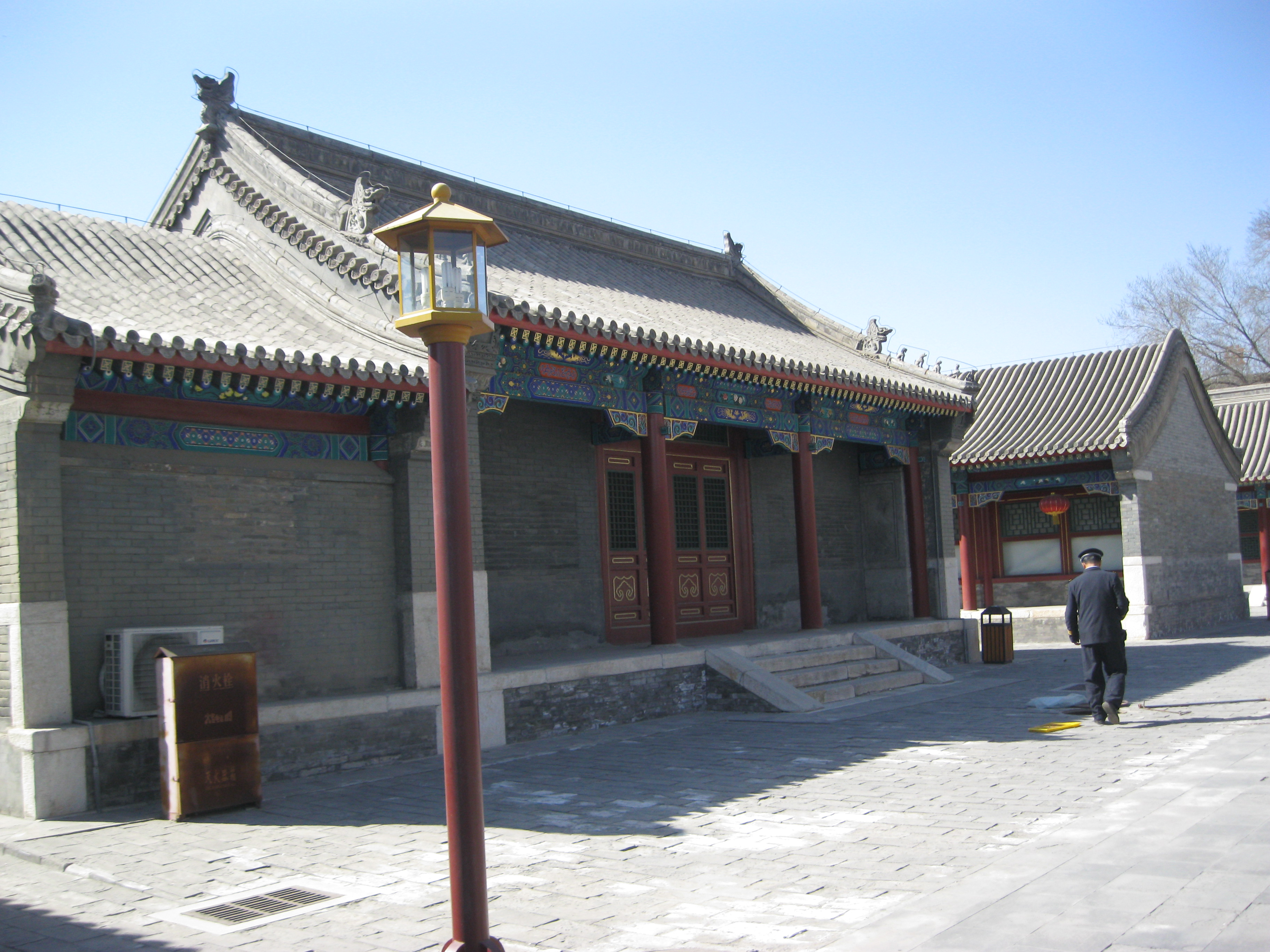
Bedchamber
