= Hohhot =

Hohhot 呼和浩特市 · ᠬᠥᠬᠡᠬᠣᠲᠠ Huhehot, Kweisui, Kuei-sui
- Prefecture-level city
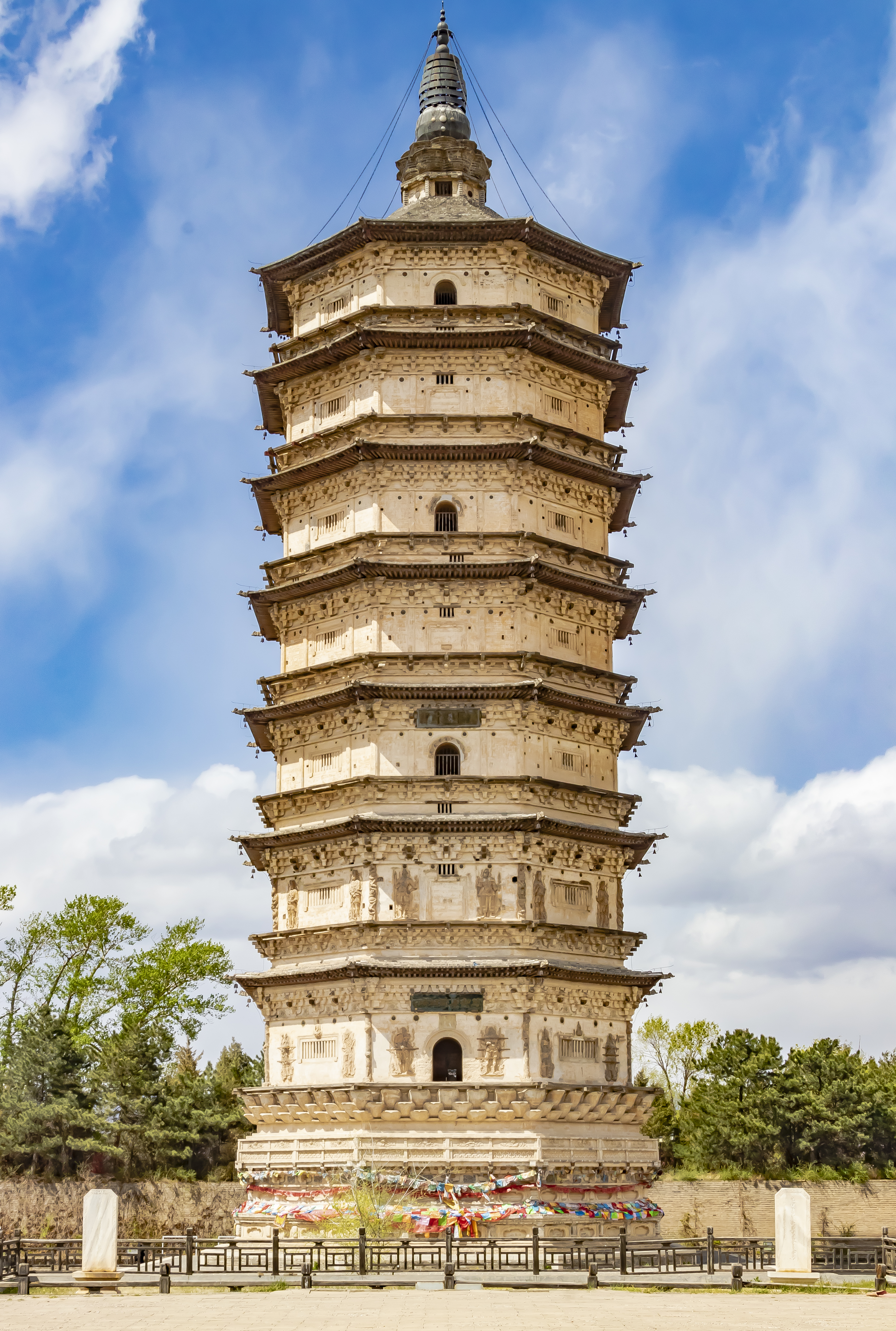
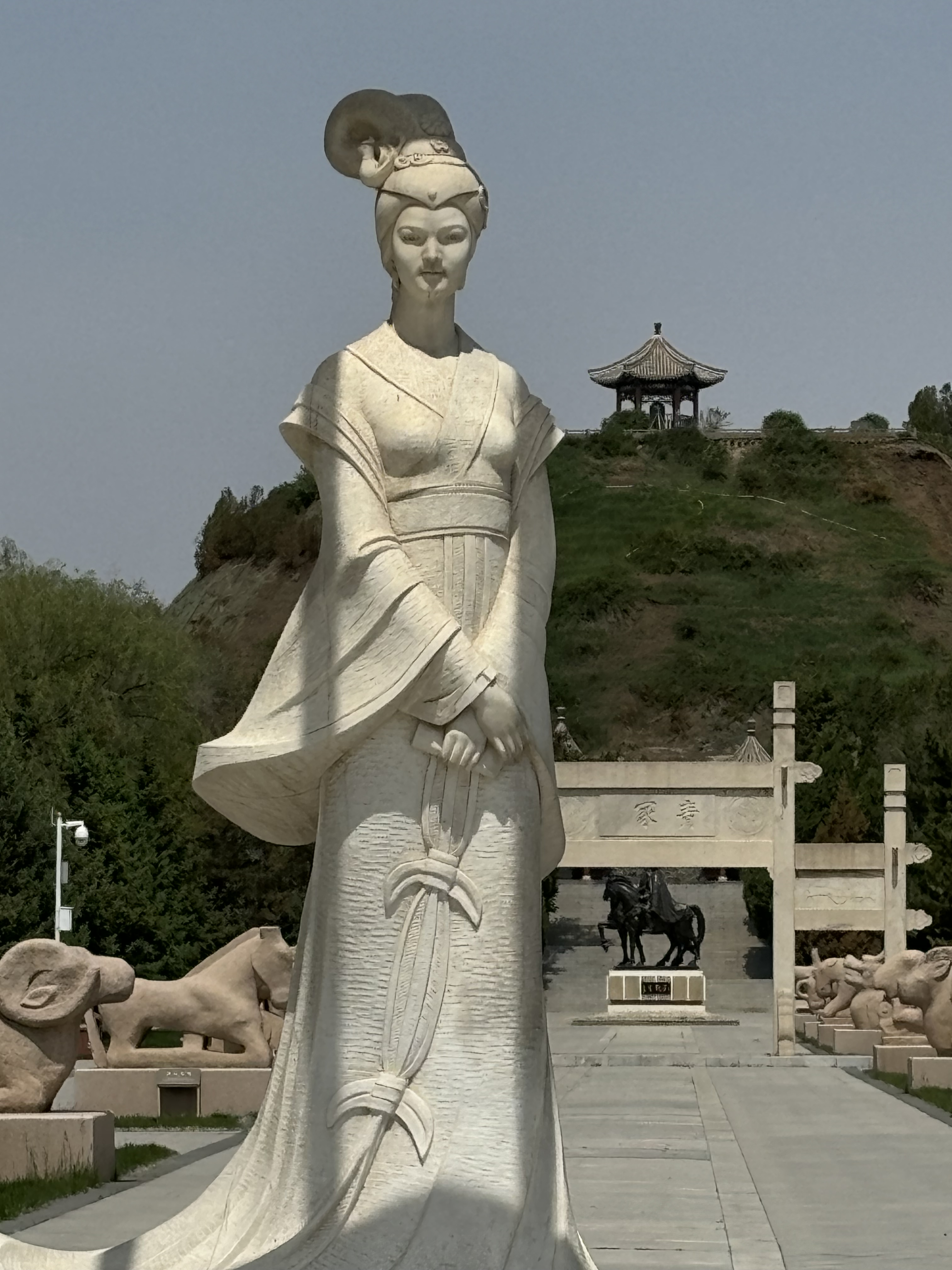
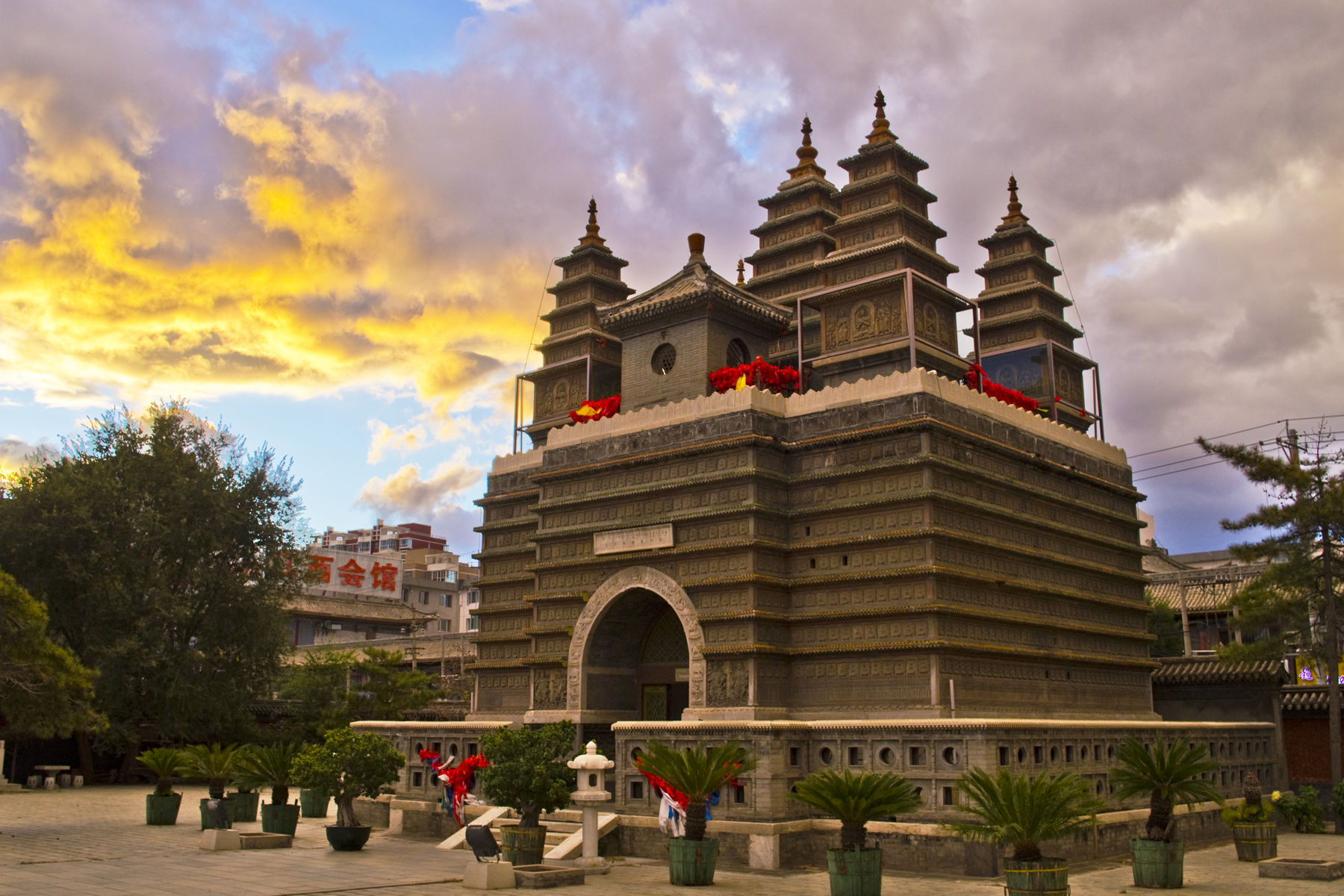
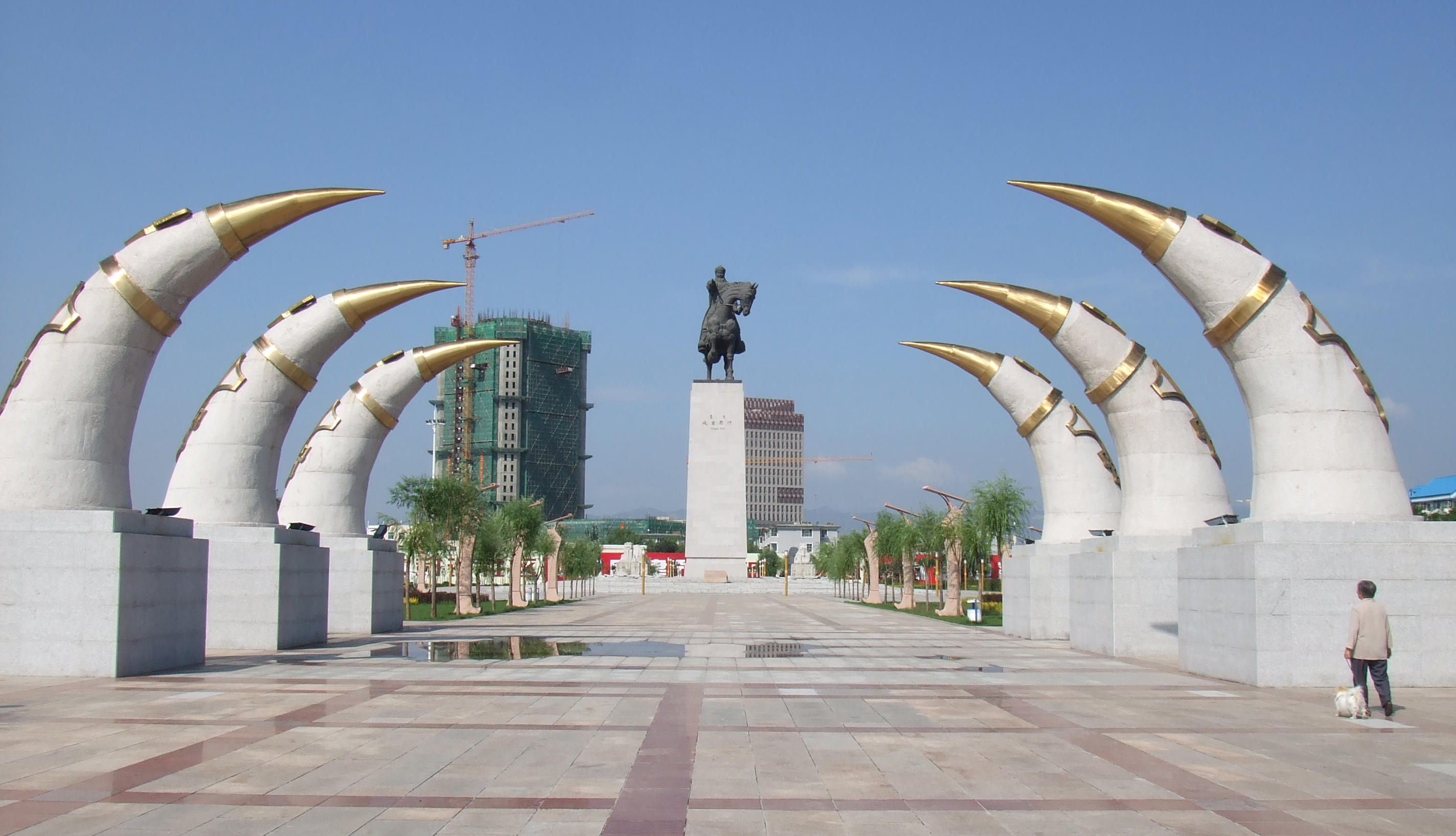
- Zhenhua Plaza Mosques of Hohhot White Pagoda Zhaojun Tomb Dazhao Temple Five Pagoda Temple Monument of Genghis Khan
- Interactive map of Hohhot
- Location of the city centre in Inner Mongolia Hohhot (China)
- Coordinates (Gongzhufu Park (公主府公园)): 40°50′31″N 111°44′56″E
- Country: China
- Region: Inner Mongolia
- County-level divisions: 10
- Township divisions: 116
- Established: 1580
- Municipal seat: Xincheng District

Government
  - Type: Prefecture-level city
  - Body: Hohhot Municipal People's Congress
  - CCP Secretary: Yu Huiwen
  - Congress Chairman: Chang Peizhong
  - Mayor: He Haidong
  - CPPCC Chairman: Bai Yongping

Area
  - Prefecture-level city: 17,186.1 km^{2} (6,635.6 sq mi)
  - Urban: 2,065.1 km^{2} (797.3 sq mi)
  - Metro: 4,830.1 km^{2} (1,864.9 sq mi)
- Elevation: 1,065 m (3,494 ft)

Population (2020 census)
  - Prefecture-level city: 3,446,100
  - Density: 200.52/km^{2} (519.34/sq mi)
  - Urban: 2,681,758
  - Urban density: 1,298.6/km^{2} (3,363.4/sq mi)
  - Metro: 2,944,889
  - Metro density: 609.70/km^{2} (1,579.1/sq mi)
  - Major ethnic groups: Han – 87.16%; Mongol – 9.98%; Hui – 1.45%

GDP
  - Prefecture-level city: CN¥ 309.1 billion US$ 49.6 billion
  - Per capita: CN¥ 101,492; US$ 16,295
- Time zone: UTC+08:00 (China Standard)
- Postal code: 010000
- Area code: 471
- ISO 3166 code: CN-NM-01
- License plate prefixes: 蒙A
- Local Dialect: Jin: Zhangjiakou-Hohhot dialect; Southern Mongolian
- Administrative division code: 150100
- Website: www.hohhot.gov.cn

Hohhot
- Hohhot as written in Mongolian

- The Chinese name of Hohhot: Hūhéhàotè

Chinese name
- Chinese: 呼和浩特
- Hanyu Pinyin: Hūhéhàotè
- Literal meaning: "Blue City" (in Mongolian)
Transcriptions
Standard Mandarin
- Hanyu Pinyin: Hūhéhàotè
- Bopomofo: ㄏㄨ ㄏㄜˊ ㄏㄠˋ ㄊㄜˋ
- Gwoyeu Romatzyh: Huherhawteh
- Wade–Giles: Hu^{1}-ho^{2}-hao^{4}-tʻê^{4}
- Tongyong Pinyin: Huhéhàotè
- Yale Romanization: Hūhéhàutè
- MPS2: Hūhéhàutè
- IPA: [xú.xɤ̌.xâʊ.tʰɤ̂]
other Mandarin
- Xiao'erjing: حُوحېحاوْتې
Yue: Cantonese
- Yale Romanization: Fūwòhhouhdahk
- Jyutping: Fu1wo4hou6dak6
- IPA: [fu˥.wɔ˩.hɔw˨.tɐk̚˨]

Abbreviation
- Chinese: 呼市
- Hanyu Pinyin: Hūshì
- Literal meaning: Ho[hhot] City
Transcriptions
Standard Mandarin
- Hanyu Pinyin: Hūshì
- Bopomofo: ㄏㄨ ㄕˋ
- Gwoyeu Romatzyh: Hushyh
- Wade–Giles: Hu^{1}-shih^{4}
- Tongyong Pinyin: Hushìh
- Yale Romanization: Hūshr̀
- MPS2: Hūshr̀
- IPA: [xú.ʂɻ̩̂]
other Mandarin
- Xiao'erjing: حُوشِ

Kweisui
- Traditional Chinese: 歸綏
- Simplified Chinese: 归绥
- Hanyu Pinyin: PRC Standard Mandarin: Guīsuí; ROC Standard Mandarin: Guīsuī
Transcriptions
Standard Mandarin
- Hanyu Pinyin: PRC Standard Mandarin: Guīsuí; ROC Standard Mandarin: Guīsuī
- Bopomofo: PRC: ㄍㄨㄟ ㄙㄨㄟˊ; ROC: ㄍㄨㄟ ㄙㄨㄟ
- Gwoyeu Romatzyh: PRC: Gueiswei; ROC: Gueisuei
- Wade–Giles: PRC: Kuei^{1}-sui^{2}; ROC: Kuei^{1}-sui^{1}
- Tongyong Pinyin: PRC: Gueisuéi; ROC: Gueisuei
- Yale Romanization: PRC: Gwēiswéi; ROC: Gwēiswēi
- MPS2: PRC: Guēisuéi; ROC: Guēisuēi
- IPA: PRC: [kwéɪ.swěɪ]; ROC: [kwéɪ.swéɪ]
other Mandarin
- Xiao'erjing: گُوَيسُوَي

Mongolian name
- Mongolian Cyrillic: Хөх хот
- Mongolian script: ᠬᠥᠬᠡᠬᠣᠲᠠ
Transcriptions
- SASM/GNC: Höh hot

Russian name
- Russian: Хух-Хото
- Romanization: Hooh-Hoto

Hohhot, (Note: /hoʊˈhɒt/; Mongolian: Classical: ᠬᠥᠬᠡᠬᠣᠲᠠ, Cyrillic: Хөх хот, Latin: Höh hot, Mongolian pronunciation: [ˈxɵx‿χɔʰt]; Chinese: 呼和浩特; pinyin: Hūhéhàotè; abbreviated 呼市; Hūshì) formerly known as Guihua or Kweisui (Guisui), (Note: traditional Chinese: 歸綏; simplified Chinese: 归绥; pinyin: PRC Standard Mandarin: Guīsuí, ROC Standard Mandarin: Guīsuī) is the capital and largest city of the northern Chinese autonomous region of Inner Mongolia, serving as the region's administrative, economic and cultural center. Its population was 3,446,100 inhabitants as of the 2020 census, of whom 2,944,889 lived in the metropolitan area consisting of 4 urban districts (including Hohhot Economic and Development Zone) plus the Tumed Left Banner.

The name of the city in Mongolian means "Blue City", although it is also wrongly referred to as the "Green City." The color blue in Mongol culture is associated with the sky, eternity and purity. In Chinese, the name can be translated as Qīng Chéng (Chinese: 青城; lit. 'Blue/Green City') The name has also been variously romanized as Kokotan, Kokutan, Kuku-hoton, Huhohaot'e, Huhehot, Huhhot, Huhot, or Köke qota.

The city is a seat of the Inner Mongolia University, the largest regional comprehensive university and was the only 211 Project University in Inner Mongolia.

== History ==
=== Early history ===
Yunzhong Commandery (Chinese: 雲中郡) was a historical commandery of China. Its territories were between the Great Wall and Yin Mountains, and correspond to part of modern-day Hohhot, Baotou and Ulanqab prefectures in Inner Mongolia. The central city of Yunzhong was in the suburbs of today's Hohhot.

The commandery was created during King Wuling of Zhao's reign after a successful campaign against the Linhu (林胡) and Loufan (樓煩) peoples. After the establishment of Qin and Han dynasty, the commandery became the frontier between Han and the Xiongnu. In early Han dynasty, the region saw frequent Xiongnu raids. However, from Emperor Wu's reign onwards, it became an important base of military operations in the wars against the Xiongnu. In 127 BC, it was from Yunzhong that General Wei Qing led a 40,000-men strong cavalry force and conquered the modern Hetao and Ordos regions.

In 2 AD, the commandery administered 11 counties, namely Yunzhong (雲中), Xianyang (咸陽), Taolin (陶林), Zhenling (楨陵), Duhe (犢和), Shaling (沙陵), Yuanyang (原陽), Shanan (沙南), Beiyu (北輿), Wuquan (武泉) and Yangshou (陽壽). The population totaled 38,303 households, or 173,270 people. During Eastern Han, 3 counties were abolished, while 3 new counties were added from Dingxiang Commandery. In 140 AD, the population was 5,351 households, or a population of 26,430. Toward the late Han dynasty, the area's population decreased sharply as residents fled from invading northern nomadic peoples, and the commandery was dissolved.

The Tuoba chieftain Gui (called Tuoba Gui) was able to refound the Dai empire in 386, and later renamed his state to Wei. From his capital at Shengle (near modern Helingeer). His descendants would, step by step, conquer the north of China, divide the Later Yan realm into two parts, and subdue the Xia (407–431), the Later Qin (384–417) and the many Liang and Yan empires.

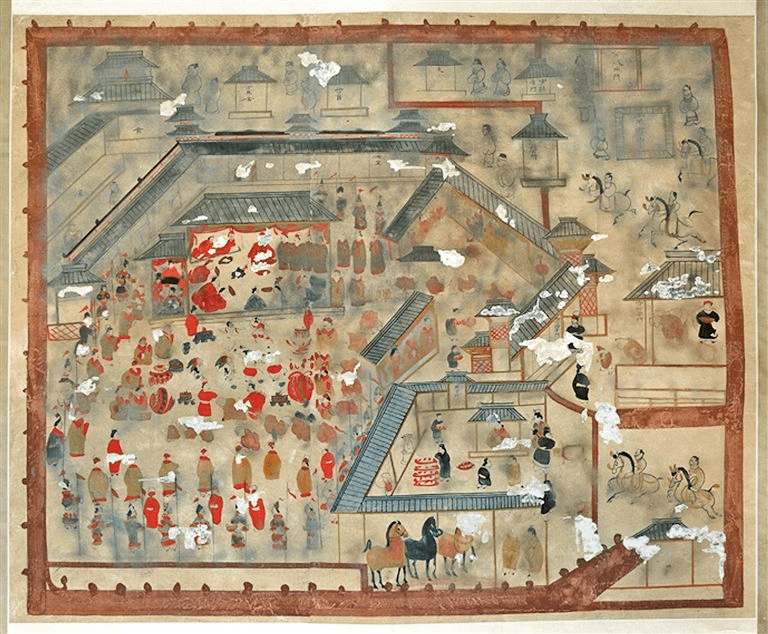
Mural of an Eastern Han era mufu conference, from a tomb in southern Hohhot

=== Ming and Qing era ===
In 1557, the Tümed Mongol leader Altan Khan began building the Da Zhao Temple on the Tümed plain in order to convince the Ming dynasty (1368–1644) government of his leadership of the southern Mongol tribes. The town that grew up around this temple was called the "Blue Town" (Kokegota in Mongolian). The Ming had been blockading the Mongols' access to Chinese iron, cotton, and crop seeds, in order to dissuade them from attacking the North China plain. In 1570, Altan Khan successfully negotiated the end of the blockade by establishing a vassal-tributary relationship with the Ming, who changed Kokegota's name to Guihua (traditional Chinese: 歸化; simplified Chinese: 归化; pinyin: Guīhuà; postal: Kweihua; lit. 'naturalization (belongs to + transform into one)') in 1575. The population of Guihua grew to over 150,000 in the early 1630s as local Mongol princes encouraged the settlement of Han Chinese merchants. There were occasional attacks on Guihua by Mongol armies, such as the total razing of the city by Ligdan Khan in 1631. Altan Khan and his successors constructed temples and fortresses in 1579, 1602 and 1727. The Tümed Mongols of the area had long since adopted a semiagricultural way of life. Hui merchants gathered north of the gate of the city's fortress, building a mosque in 1693. Their descendants formed the nucleus of the modern Huimin district.

After the Manchus founded the Qing dynasty (1644–1912), the Kangxi Emperor (reigned 1661–1722) sent troops to control the region, which was of interest to the Qing as a center of study of Tibetan Buddhism. Just 2 km northeast of Guihua the Qing built the strong garrison town of Suiyuan (traditional Chinese: 綏遠; simplified Chinese: 绥远; pinyin: PRC Standard Mandarin: Suíyuǎn, ROC Standard Mandarin: Suīyuǎn), from which they supervised the defense of southwestern Inner Mongolia against Mongol attacks from the north in 1735–39. Guihua and Suiyuan was merged into Shanxi province and became Guihua County (歸化縣; 归化县; Guīhuà Xiàn) of Qing China. French missionaries established a Catholic church in Guihua in 1874, but the Christians were forced to flee to Beijing during the antiforeign Boxer Rebellion of 1899–1901.

Statue of Altan Khan, considered the founder of Huhhot

=== Republican era ===
In 1913, the government of the new Republic of China united the garrison town of Suiyuan and the old town of Guihua as Guisui (traditional Chinese: 歸綏; simplified Chinese: 归绥; pinyin: PRC Standard Mandarin: Guīsuí, ROC Standard Mandarin: Guīsuī; postal: Kweisui). Guisui town was the center of Guisui County (歸綏縣; 归绥县; PRC: Guīsuí Xiàn, ROC: Guīsuī Xiàn) and the capital of Suiyuan Province in northern China. A bubonic plague outbreak in 1917 and the connection of Guisui to railway links in Shanxi, Shaanxi, Hebei, and Beijing helped renew the economy of Guisui town by forming links with eastern China and western China's Xinjiang province. In 1918, the American specialist on Inner Asia Owen Lattimore noted Guisui's ethnic composition as "a town purely Han Chinese except for the Lama monasteries ... the Tümeds are now practically nonexistent and the nearest Mongolians are to be sought at 50 or 60 miles [80 or 100 kilometres] distance on the plateau." During the progressive Japanese invasion of China in the 1930s, the Japanese created the puppet state of Mengjiang headed by Prince De, who renamed Guisui "Blue City" Hohhot; (Chinese: 厚和市; pinyin: Hòuhé shì). After the surrender of Japan in 1945, the Republic of China changed the name back to Guisui. The Chinese Communist Party's forces drove out General Fu Zuoyi, the Republic's commander in Suiyuan, during the Chinese Civil War, and after the Chinese Communist Revolution in 1949, Guisui was renamed Hohhot.

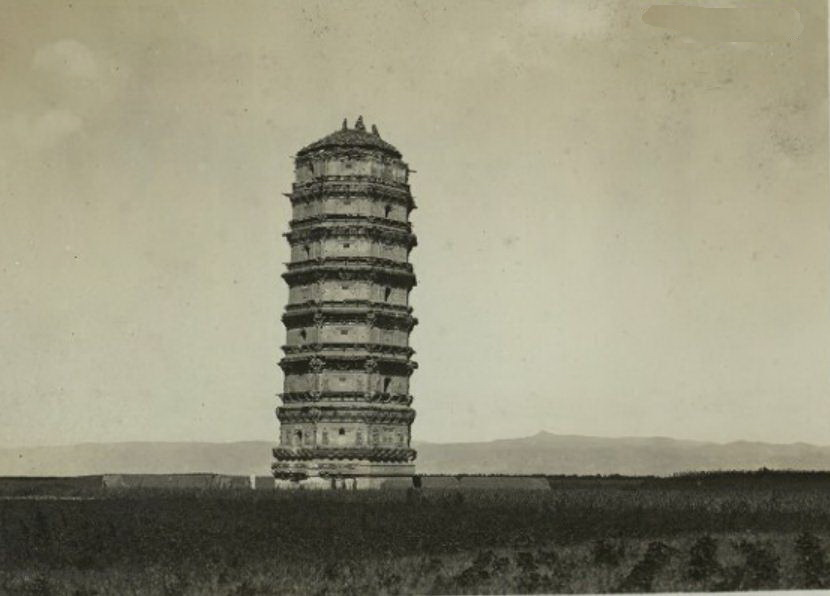
Wanbu Huayanjing Pagoda (Baita Pagoda) in Hohhot, 1942

=== People's Republic era ===
During the Civil War, seeking the support of separatist Mongols, the Communists established the Inner Mongolia Autonomous Region in Mongol-minority areas of the Republic's provinces of Suiyuan, Xing'an, Chahar, and Rehe. Guisui was chosen as the region's administrative centre in 1952, replacing Zhangjiakou. In 1954, after the establishment of the People's Republic of China, the city was renamed from Guisui to Hohhot, though with a different Chinese pronunciation of Huhehaote.

The city has seen significant development since China's reform and opening up began. The city's far east side began development around 2000 and is now home to the municipal government, most of the Autonomous Region's administrative buildings, an artificial lake called Ruyi He, and a large number of condominiums, mostly built by the local real estate company Gold Horse International Inc. The Hohhot City Stadium, built on the city's north side, was finished in 2007.

A city with a rich cultural background, Hohhot is known for its historical sites and temples and is one of the major tourist destinations of Inner Mongolia. It is also nationally known as the home of China's dairy giants Mengniu and Yili, and was declared "Dairy Capital of China" by the China Dairy Industry Association and the Dairy Association of China in 2005.

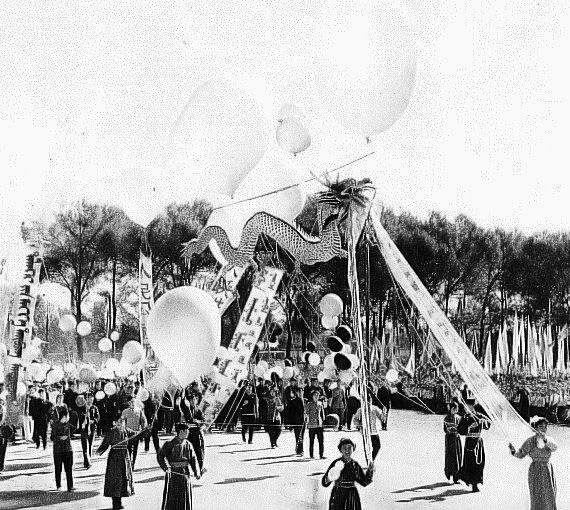
People's Republic 10th Anniversary Parade in Hohhot

== Geography ==
Located in the south central part of Inner Mongolia, Hohhot is encircled by the Daqing Shan (Chinese: 大青山; lit. 'Great blue Mountains') to the north and the Hetao Plateau to the south.

The city's antipodal location is 22 kilometres (14 mi) from the village of Los Menucos in Río Negro Provence, Argentina.

Hohhot from above showing the Daqing Shan mountains to the north, 2023

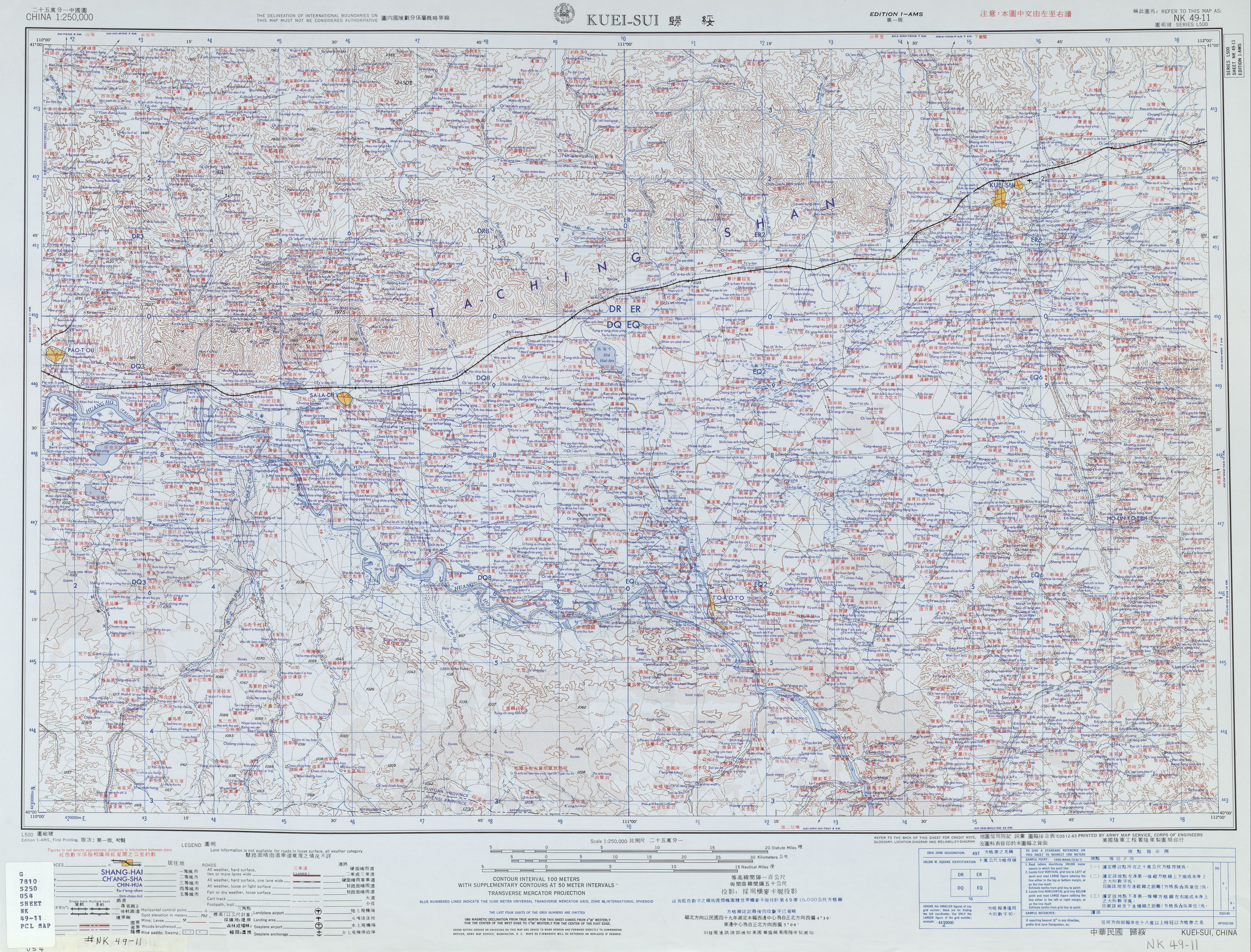
Map including Hohhot (labeled as KUEI-SUI) (US Army, 1963)

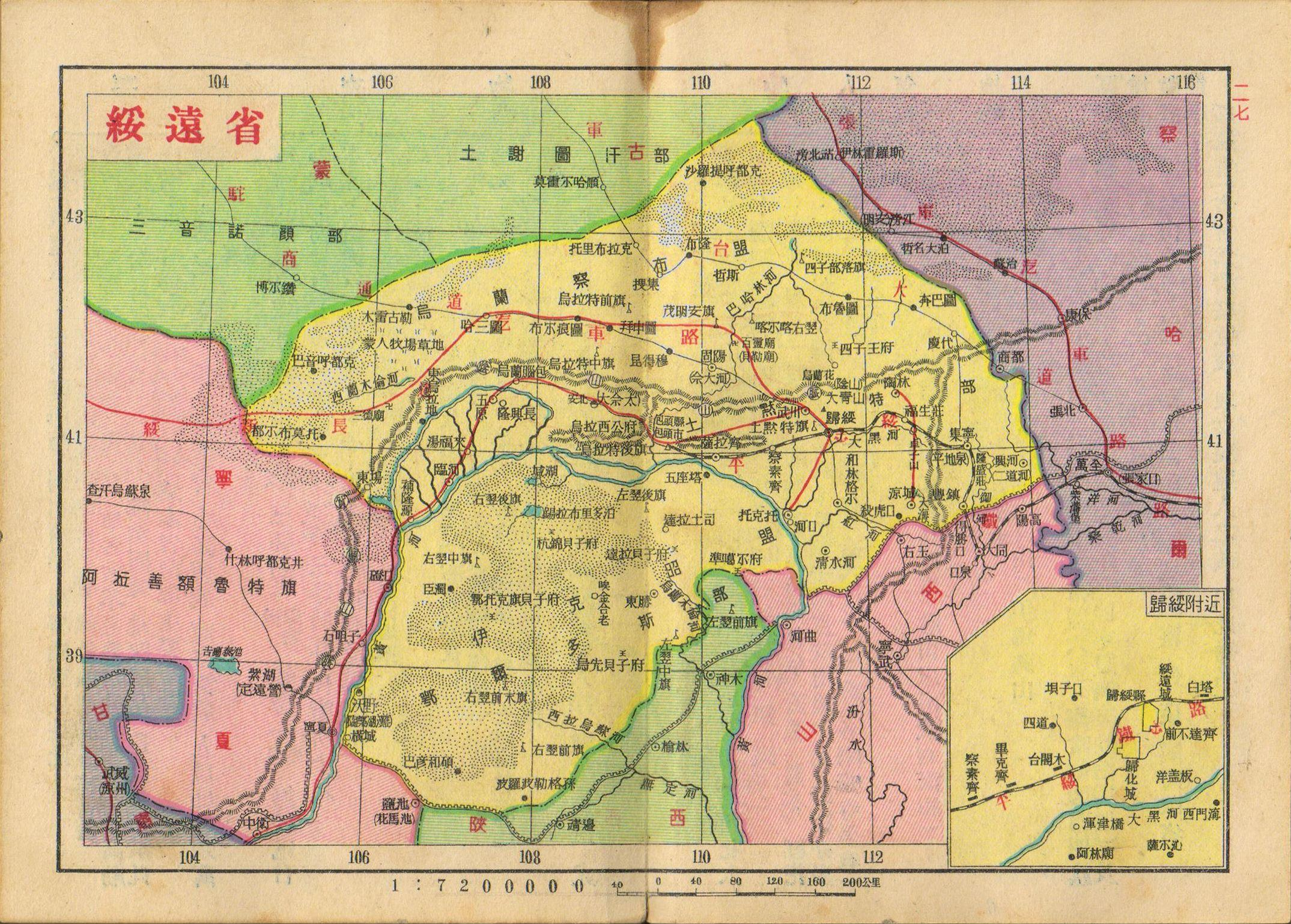
Map of the former Suiyuan province, with detail of Hohhot (as "Guisui") in the lower right, 1936

=== Climate ===
Hohhot features a cold semi-arid climate (Köppen BSk), marked by long, cold, and very dry winters; hot, somewhat humid summers; strong winds (especially in spring); and monsoonal influence. The coldest month is January, with a daily mean of −10.7 °C (12.7 °F), while July, the hottest month, averages 23.2 °C (73.8 °F). The annual mean temperature is 7.6 °C (45.7 °F), and the annual precipitation is 411 millimetres (16.2 in), with more than half of it falling in July and August alone. Variability can be very high, however: in 1965 Hohhot recorded as little as 155.1 mm (6.11 in) but six years before that, as much as 929.2 mm (36.58 in), of which over a third (338.6 mm (13.33 in)) only in July.

Hohhot is a popular destination for tourists during the summer months because of the nearby Zhaohe grasslands. More recently, due to desertification, the city sees sandstorms on almost an annual basis. With monthly percent possible sunshine ranging from 54 percent in November to 66 percent in September, sunshine is abundant year-round, the city receives 2,680 hours of bright sunshine annually. Extreme temperatures have ranged from −32.8 °C (−27 °F) on 6 February 1951 to 38.9 °C (102 °F) on 30 July 2010, though unofficially a record low of −36.2 °C (−33 °F) was recorded in January 1930.

Climate data for Hohhot, elevation 1,154 m (3,786 ft), (1991–2020 normals, extremes 1951–present)
Month	Jan	Feb	Mar	Apr	May	Jun	Jul	Aug	Sep	Oct	Nov	Dec	Year
Record high °C (°F)	10.6 (51.1)	17.0 (62.6)	23.7 (74.7)	33.4 (92.1)	35.0 (95.0)	36.7 (98.1)	38.9 (102.0)	36.8 (98.2)	32.7 (90.9)	26.5 (79.7)	20.4 (68.7)	11.6 (52.9)	38.9 (102.0)
Mean daily maximum °C (°F)	−4.8 (23.4)	0.8 (33.4)	8.4 (47.1)	17.1 (62.8)	23.4 (74.1)	27.8 (82.0)	29.1 (84.4)	27.2 (81.0)	22.1 (71.8)	14.5 (58.1)	4.7 (40.5)	−3.3 (26.1)	13.9 (57.1)
Daily mean °C (°F)	−10.7 (12.7)	−5.7 (21.7)	1.7 (35.1)	10.0 (50.0)	16.6 (61.9)	21.4 (70.5)	23.2 (73.8)	21.4 (70.5)	15.6 (60.1)	7.7 (45.9)	−1.3 (29.7)	−8.8 (16.2)	7.6 (45.7)
Mean daily minimum °C (°F)	−15.3 (4.5)	−11 (12)	−4.2 (24.4)	3.0 (37.4)	9.2 (48.6)	14.7 (58.5)	17.4 (63.3)	15.7 (60.3)	9.7 (49.5)	2.1 (35.8)	−5.8 (21.6)	−13.1 (8.4)	1.9 (35.4)
Record low °C (°F)	−36.2 (−33.2)	−32.8 (−27.0)	−21.1 (−6.0)	−12.2 (10.0)	−4 (25)	2.3 (36.1)	8.3 (46.9)	4.6 (40.3)	−3.9 (25.0)	−11.1 (12.0)	−20.5 (−4.9)	−29.1 (−20.4)	−36.2 (−33.2)
Average precipitation mm (inches)	2.2 (0.09)	4.6 (0.18)	9.8 (0.39)	13.5 (0.53)	33.3 (1.31)	54.6 (2.15)	115.2 (4.54)	84.6 (3.33)	61.0 (2.40)	20.9 (0.82)	8.3 (0.33)	3.4 (0.13)	411.4 (16.2)
Average precipitation days (≥ 0.1 mm)	2.2	2.3	3.1	3.6	6.7	9.9	12.4	10.7	9.1	4.8	2.9	2.2	69.9
Average snowy days	3.4	3.6	3.7	1.4	0.2	0	0	0	0.1	0.6	3.4	3.8	20.2
Average relative humidity (%)	56	47	39	33	36	44	56	59	57	54	54	55	49
Average dew point °C (°F)	−18 (0)	−16 (3)	−12 (10)	−8 (18)	−1 (30)	7 (45)	13 (55)	12 (54)	6 (43)	−2 (28)	−10 (14)	−16 (3)	−4 (25)
Mean monthly sunshine hours	159.0	188.3	237.1	262.8	281.5	262.3	252.1	251.0	233.0	223.9	174.4	155.5	2,680.9
Percentage possible sunshine	53	62	64	65	63	58	55	63	66	59	54	60	60
Source 1: China Meteorological Administration
Source 2: Weather China all-time extreme temperature Source 3: Time and Date (dewpoints, 1985–2015), Pogodaiklimat.ru (extremes)

== Administrative divisions ==
The city is administratively at the prefecture-level, meaning that it administers both its urban area and the rural regions in its vicinity. The administrative area includes 4 counties, 4 districts, and a county-level banner; they are further divided into 20 urban sub-districts, and 96 townships. The data here represented is in km^{2} and uses data from the 2010 Census.

Map
English name	Mongolian	Simplified Chinese	Pinyin	Area	Population	Density
City Proper
Huimin District (Hodong'arad District)	ᠬᠣᠳᠣᠩ ᠠᠷᠠᠳ ᠤᠨ ᠲᠣᠭᠣᠷᠢᠭ (Qotoŋ Arad-un toɣoriɣ)	回民区	Huímín Qū	194.4	394,555	2,030
Xincheng District (Xinhot District)	ᠰᠢᠨ᠎ᠡ ᠬᠣᠲᠠ ᠲᠣᠭᠣᠷᠢᠭ (Sin-e Qota toɣoriɣ)	新城区	Xīnchéng Qū	660.6	567,255	859
Yuquan District	ᠢᠤᠢ ᠴᠢᠤᠸᠠᠨ ᠲᠣᠭᠣᠷᠢᠭ (Iui čiuvan toɣoriɣ)	玉泉区	Yùquán Qū	207.2	383,365	1,850
Saihan District	ᠰᠠᠶᠢᠬᠠᠨ ᠲᠣᠭᠣᠷᠢᠭ (Sayiqan toɣoriɣ)	赛罕区	Sàihǎn Qū	1,002.9	635,599	634
Rural
Togtoh County	ᠲᠣᠭᠲᠠᠬᠤ ᠰᠢᠶᠠᠨ (Toɣtaqu siyan)	托克托县	Tuōkètuō Xiàn	1,407.8	200,840	143
Wuchuan County	ᠦᠴᠤᠸᠠᠨ ᠰᠢᠶᠠᠨ (Üčuvan siyan)	武川县	Wǔchuān Xiàn	4,682.3	108,726	23
Horinger County	ᠬᠣᠷᠢᠨ ᠭᠡᠷ ᠰᠢᠶᠠᠨ (Qorin Ger siyan)	和林格尔县	Hélíngé'ěr Xiàn	3,447.8	169,856	49
Qingshuihe County	ᠴᠢᠩ ᠱᠦᠢ ᠾᠧ ᠰᠢᠶᠠᠨ (Čiŋ šüi hė siyan)	清水河县	Qīngshuǐhé Xiàn	2,859	93,887	33
Tumed Left Banner (Tumed Jun Banner)	ᠲᠦᠮᠡᠳ ᠵᠡᠭᠦᠨ ᠬᠣᠰᠢᠭᠤ (Tümed Jegün qosiɣu)	土默特左旗	Tǔmòtè Zuǒ Qí	2,765	312,532	113

== Demographics ==
Historical population
Year	Pop.	±%
1953	792,600	—
1964	1,118,600	+41.1%
1982	1,645,200	+47.1%
1990	1,911,600	+16.2%
2000	2,437,900	+27.5%
2010	2,866,600	+17.6%
Population size may be affected by changes on administrative divisions.

The urban population of Hohhot has increased rapidly since the 1990s. According to the 2010 Census, the population of Hohhot had reached 2,866,615 people, 428,717 more inhabitants than in 2000 (the average annual demographic growth for the period 2000–2010 was of 1.63 percent). Its built-up (or metro) area is home to 1,980,774 inhabitants (4 urban districts).

The majority of the population of Hohhot are Han Chinese, representing 87.16 percent of the total population in 2010. Most Han in Hohhot, if their ancestry is traced several decades back, have ancestors from Shanxi, northeast China, or Hebei. Most Mongols in the city speak Chinese. A 1993 survey conducted by Inner Mongolia University found that only 8 percent of Tümed Mongols (the majority tribe in Hohhot) could speak the Mongolian language. A significant portion of the population is of mixed ethnic origin. According to the anthropologist William Jankowiak, author of the book Sex, Death, and Hierarchy in a Chinese City (1993), there is "relatively little difference between minority culture and Han culture" in Hohhot, with differences concentrating around relatively minor attributes such as food and art, and similarities abounding over fundamental issues of ethics, status, life goals, and worldview.

Ethnic groups in Hohhot, according to the 2000 census, were:

Ethnicity	Population	Percentage
Han Chinese	2,115,888	88.42%
Mongol	204,846	8.56%
Hui	38,417	1.61%
Manchu	26,439	1.10%
Daur	2,663	0.11%
Korean	1,246	0.05%
Miao	443	0.02%

== Economy ==
Production line at Yili Dairy Headquarters

Hohhot is a major industrial center within Inner Mongolia. Together with Baotou and Ordos, it accounts for more than 60 percent of the total industrial output of Inner Mongolia. After Baotou and Ordos, it is the third-largest economy of the province, with GDP of RMB 247.56 billion in 2012, up 11.0 percent year on year. Hohhot accounted for approximately 15.5 percent of the province's total GDP in 2012. It is also the largest consumer center in the region, recording ¥102.2 billion retail sales of consumer goods in 2012, an increase of 14.9 percent from 2011. The city has been a central developmental target for the China Western Development project being pursued by the Central Government. There are many famous enterprises located in Hohhot, including China's largest dairy producer by sales revenue, the Inner Mongolia Yili Industrial Group, and the China Mengniu Dairy Co.

Hailang Plaza

As the economic center of Inner Mongolia, Hohhot's urban area has expanded greatly since the 1990s. CBDs have grown rapidly in all the city's major districts. The completion of a new office tower for the Municipal Government in Eastern Hohhot marked a shift of the city center to the east. Hailiang Plaza (海亮广场), a 41-floor tower constructed in the city center, became one of the few notable department stores for luxury merchandise in the city.

=== Major development zones ===
- Hohhot Economic and Technological Development Zone
- Hohhot Export Processing Zone

== Culture ==
Due to its relatively diverse cultural make-up, and despite its characteristics as a mid-sized Chinese industrial city, the Hohhot street scene has no shortage of ethnic minority elements. Tongdao Road, a major street in the old town area, is decorated with Islamic and Mongol exterior designs on all its buildings. A series of government initiatives in recent years have emphasized Hohhot's identity with ethnic minority groups, especially in increasing Mongol-themed architecture around the city. By regulation, all street signs and public transportation announcements are in both Chinese and Mongolian.

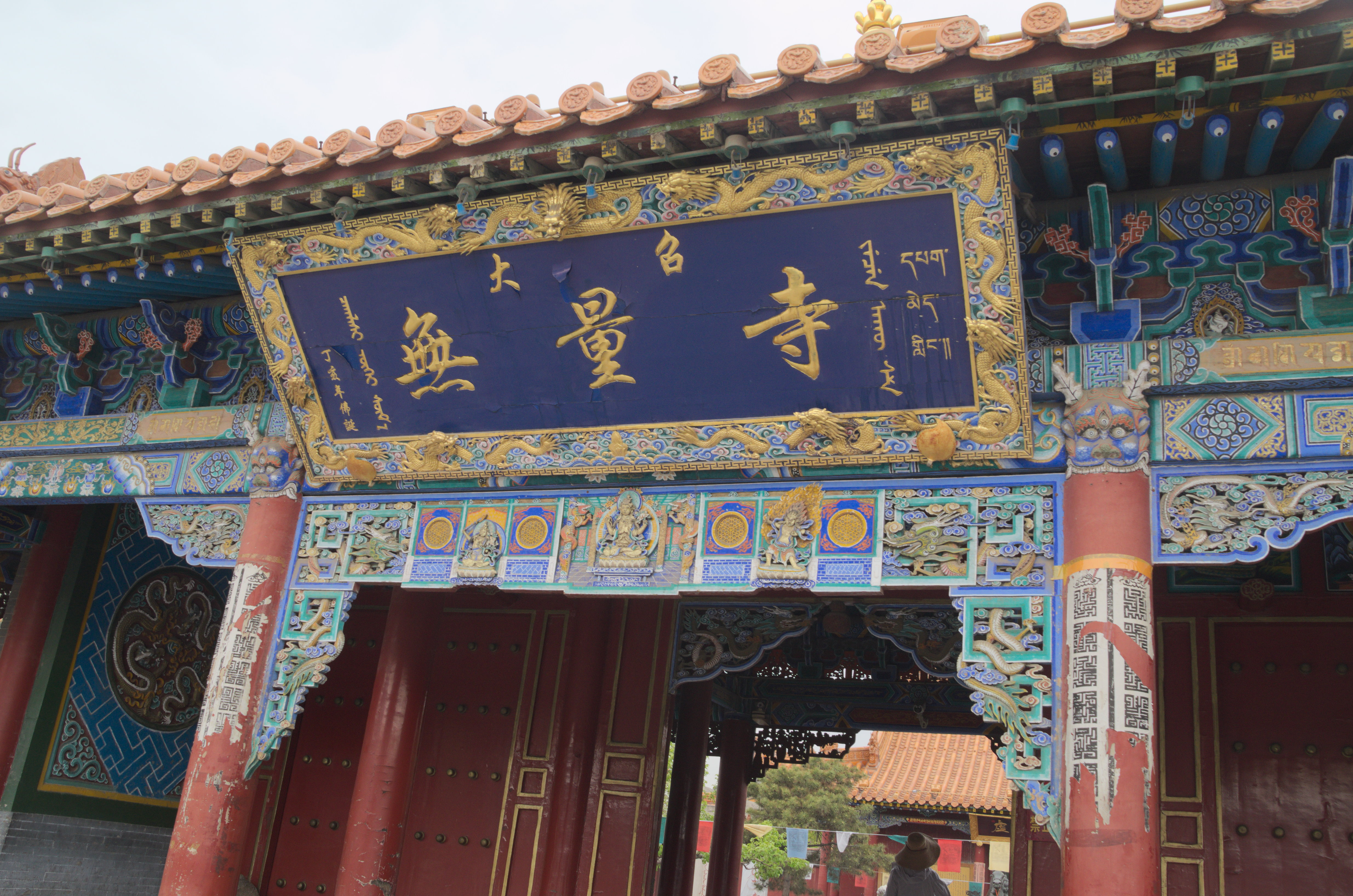
A sign in Mongolian, Chinese, Tibetan, and Manchu at the Dazhao temple in Hohhot.

=== Dialect ===
Older Hohhot residents mostly tend to converse in the Hohhot dialect, a branch of the Jin language from neighbouring Shanxi province. This spoken form can be difficult to understand for speakers of other Mandarin Chinese dialects. The newer residents, mostly concentrated in Xincheng and Saihan Districts, speak Hohhot-based Mandarin, the majority also with a noticeable accent and some unique vocabulary.

=== Religion ===
Hohhot has a diverse range of religions with a long history in the city, and since the 2000s there has been a boom in the construction or re-construction of religious sites. In the 2010s, the Old City and Hui district hosted 12 Buddhist monasteries, a dozen or so Chinese temples, six mosques, a Catholic church and five Protestant churches.

Xilitu Zhao, Tibetan Buddhist monastery

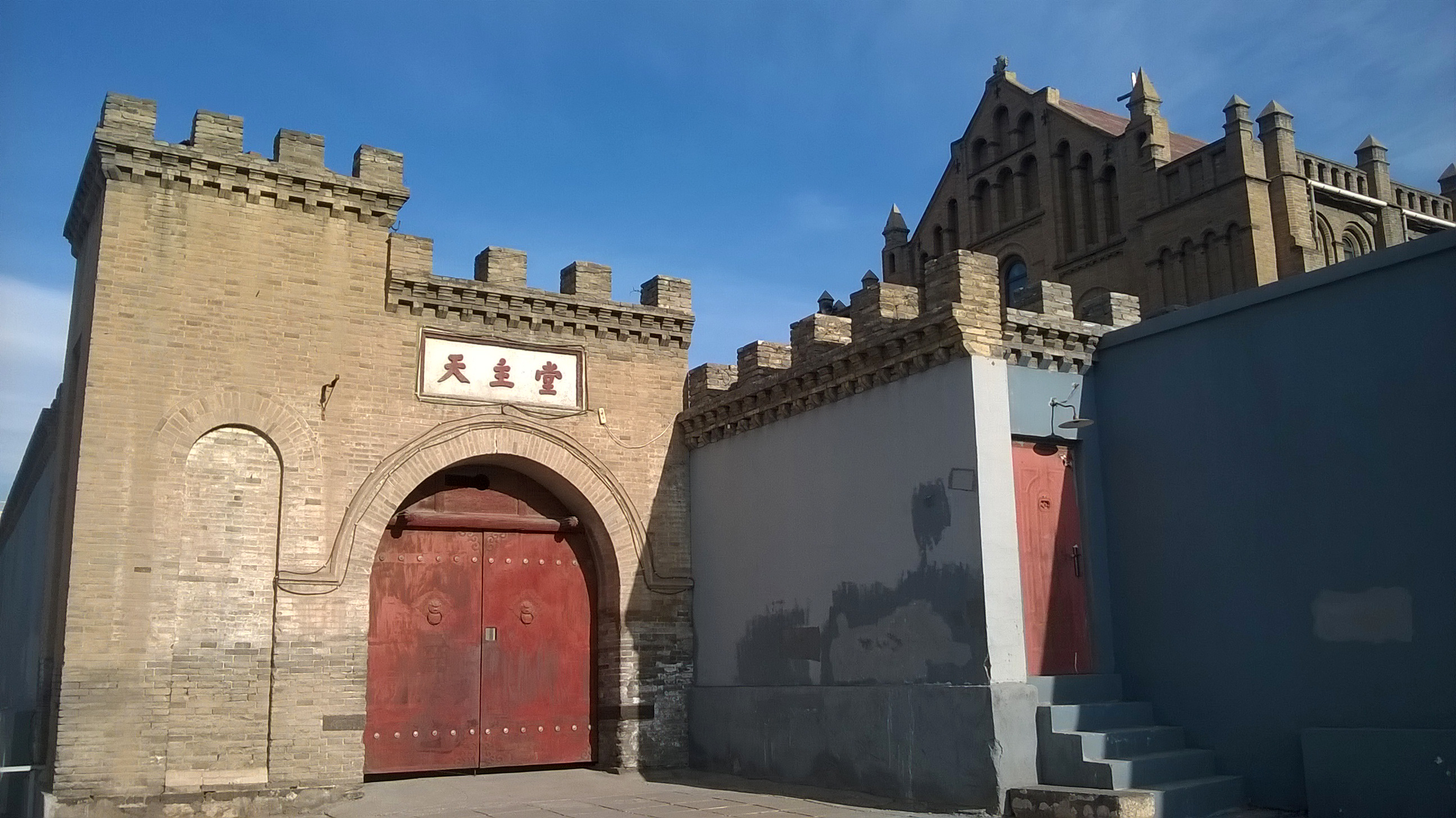
Sacred Heart Cathedral, Hohhot

Great Mosque of Hohhot

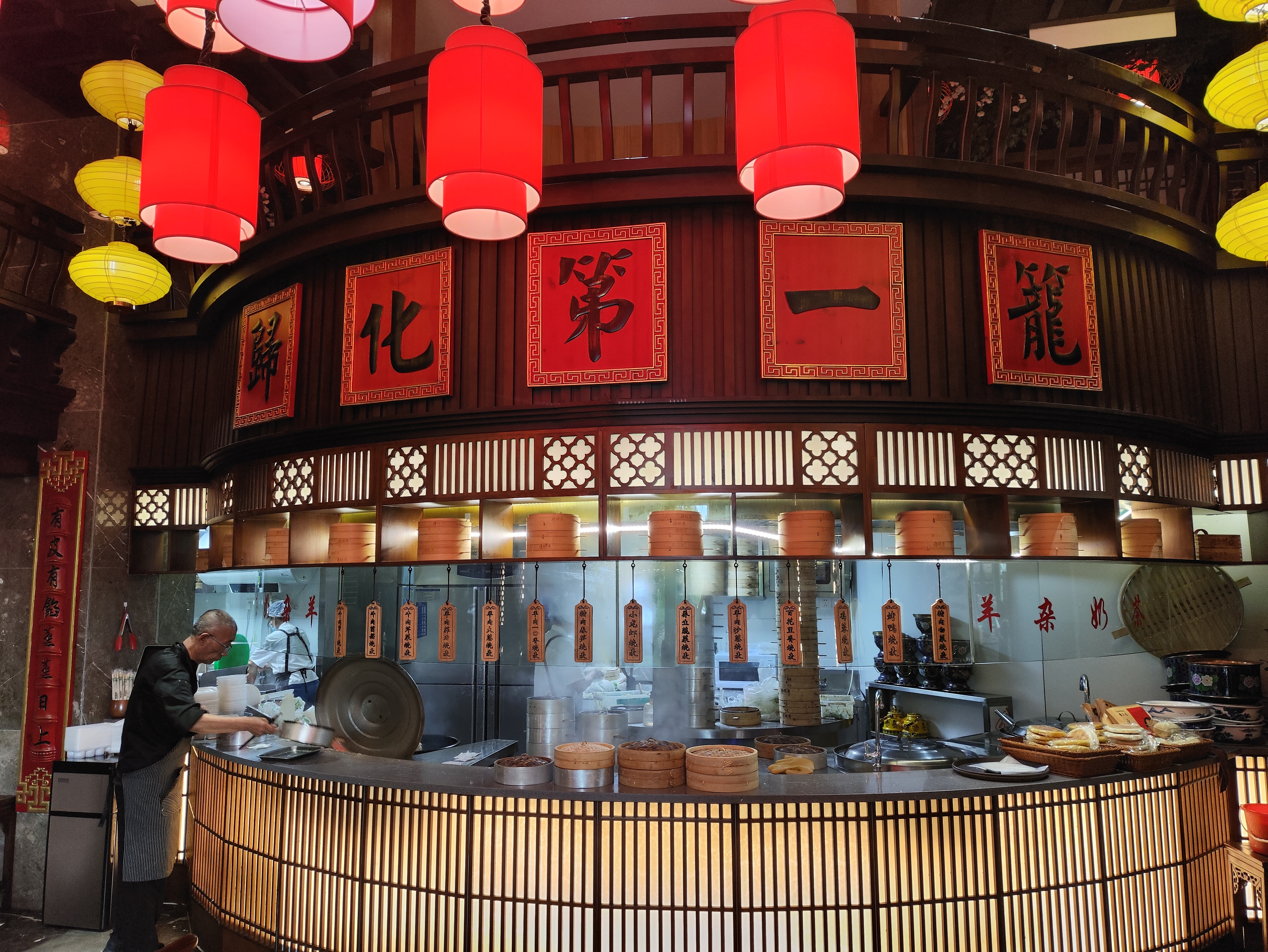
Kitchen of a shaomai restaurant

=== Cuisine ===
Food specialty in the area is mostly focused on Mongol cuisine and dairy products. Commercially, Hohhot is known for being the base of the nationally renowned dairy giants Yili and Mengniu. The Mongol drink suutei tsai (Chinese: 奶茶; pinyin: nǎichá; lit. 'milk tea'), has become a typical breakfast selection for anyone living in or visiting the city. The city also has rich traditions in the making of hot pot and shaomai, a type of traditional Chinese dumpling served as dim sum.

== Transportation ==
=== Airport ===
Hohhot's Baita International Airport (IATA:HET) is located about 14.3 km (8.9 mi) east of the city centre by car. It has direct flights to larger domestic cities including Beijing, Tianjin, Shanghai, Shenzhen, Chengdu, and others. It also has flights to Taichung, Hong Kong, and Ulaanbaatar, Mongolia.

Board of a Huhhot to Shanghai train

=== Railway ===
Hohhot lies on the Jingbao Railway from Beijing to Baotou, and is served by two railway stations: Hohhot railway station and Hohhot East railway station. The line began operation in 1921. Trains to Beijing link to destinations to the south and the northeast. The most prominent rail link with Beijing is the overnight K90 train, which has served the Hohhot-Beijing line since the 1980s and is referred to colloquially as the "9-0". Westbound trains go through Baotou and Lanzhou. There are also rail links to most major Inner Mongolian cities and to Ulaanbaatar, Mongolia.

Because the quickest trip to Beijing takes around six and a half hours despite the relatively close proximity of the two cities, plans for high-speed rail were discussed extensively prior to the construction of a high-speed railway station beginning in 2008. The station was completed in 2011 and initially serviced only ordinary lines. In January 2015, CRH opened its first D-series (dongchezu) route in Inner Mongolia in the Baotou-Hohhot-Jining corridor, shortening travel time between Inner Mongolia's two largest cities to a mere 50 minutes. This line reached a maximum speed of 200 km/h (124 mph) between Hohhot and Baotou. Another high-speed rail line linking Hohhot to Zhangjiakou and the planned Beijing-Zhangjiakou railway are due for completion in 2017, and are designed to operate at 250 km/h (155 mph). The section between Hohhot and Ulanqab (Jining) opened in August 2017; travel time between the two cities was shortened to 40 minutes.

=== Expressways ===
An expressway built in 1997 (then known as the Hubao Expressway) links Hohhot with Baotou. In recent years this expressway has been expanded eastwards to Jining and Zhangjiakou, and on to Beijing as part of the G6 Beijing–Lhasa Expressway (Jingzang Expressway). The city is on the route of China National Highway 110, which runs from Yinchuan to Beijing. China National Highway 209 begins in Hohhot and carries traffic southbound towards southern China, with its terminus in Guangxi. Hohhot is connected to its northern counties by the Huwu Highway, which was completed in 2006. Previously, travel to the northern counties had required lengthy navigation through mountainous terrain.

Long-distance buses connect Hohhot to outlying counties, the cities of Baotou, Wuhai, and Ordos, and other areas in Inner Mongolia.

=== Public transport and roadways ===
Hohhot's major north–south thoroughfares are called roads (Lu) and its east–west thoroughfares are called streets (Jie). The largest elevated interchange is near the site of the city's Drum Tower (Gulou), after which it is named. Several major streets are named after Inner Mongolian leagues and cities; among these, Hulun Buir, Jurim (now Tongliao), Ulaanhad (Now Chifeng), Xilin Gol, and Xing'an run north–south, while Bayannur, Hailar, Ulaanqab, and Erdos run east–west.

The city's public transit system is composed of nearly one hundred bus routes and a large fleet of taxicabs, which are normally green or blue. Bus fare is 1 yuan; taxi fares begin at 8 yuan.

Concourse of Xinhua Square Station, Hohhot Metro

=== Metro ===
The Hohhot Metro is in operation.

The red line (Line 1) is 21.719 km (13.5 mi) long.

The blue line (Line 2) is 27.32 km (17.0 mi) long.

== Education ==
Universities located in Hohhot include:

- Inner Mongolia University of Finance and Economics
- Inner Mongolia University, only 211 Project University in Inner Mongolia.
- Inner Mongolia University of Agriculture
- Inner Mongolia Normal University
- Inner Mongolia University of Technology
- Inner Mongolia College of Medicine
- Inner Mongolia College of Finance and Economics
- Inner Mongolia Police Professional College
- Hohhot College of Education
- Honder College of Inner Mongolia Normal University

High Schools located in Hohhot include:

- Hohhot No.2 Middle School
- Affiliated Middle School to Inner Mongolia Normal University
- Hohhot experimental middle school
- Hohhot No.1 Middle School

Hohhot has hosted the 39th China Adolescents Science & Technology Innovation Contest and had hosted it 2 times before.

== Sports ==
Hohhot lacked a professional soccer team until Shenyang Dongjin F.C. relocated to Hohhot, changing their name to Hohhot Dongjin, in 2012. They played at Hohhot City Stadium, which was newly built in 2007. The club finished in the bottom of the league in the 2012 season and was and relegated to League Two. After playing half a season at Hohhot in 2013, the team relocated to Liaoning and chose Benxi City Stadium as their new home court.

On 14 January 2015, Taiyuan Zhongyou Jiayi F.C. moved to Hohhot and changed their name to Nei Mongu Zhongyou F.C. The team play in China League One and chose Hohhot City Stadium as their home in 2015. The team had been first established as Shanxi Jiayi F.C. on 8 October 2011.

== Notable landmarks ==
There were over 50 Ming and Qing Buddhist temples and towers in Guihua and Suiyuan.

- Zhaojun Tomb (昭君墓), located about nine kilometers south of the city center. It is said to be the tomb of Wang Zhaojun, a woman of the Han Empire who married a Xiongnu Chanyu (king).
- Baita Pagoda (白塔), located in the eastern rural area nearing the airport. It was constructed during the Liao dynasty. The airport of Hohhot is named after Baita Pagoda.
- Da Zhao Temple (大召), located in the centre of Guihua town. It was constructed in the Northern Yuan dynasty and is the oldest Buddhist lama monastery in the city.
- Temple of the Five Pagodas (五塔寺), located in the eastern part of Guihua town. It was completed in the Qing dynasty, with architecture very similar to that of Indian temples. On its walls there are more than 1,500 figures of Buddha.
- Residence of Gurun Princess Kejing (固倫恪靖公主府), located at the foot of Yinshan Mountain. It was the mansion of Gurun Princess Kejing of the Qing dynasty, who was married to a Mongol prince.
- Residence of the General (將軍衙署), located in the centre of Suiyuan town. It was the residence and office building of Suiyuan Generals of the Qing dynasty.
- Great Mosque of Hohhot (清真大寺), located out of the northern gate of Guihua town. It was constructed during the Qing dynasty.
- Inner Mongolia Museum (内蒙古博物院). Main exhibits include dinosaur fossils, historical artifacts of nomadic peoples, and the cultural life of modern nomadic peoples.
- Qingcheng Park (青城公园), formerly People's Park, in the city center
- Wusutu Zhao Monastery, located at the foot of the Daqing Mountains.

== See also ==
- Manhan folk song
- Suiyuan Province

== Bibliography ==
- Perkins, Dorothy (1999). Encyclopedia of China: The Essential Reference to China, Its History and Culture. 1st paperback edition: 2000. New York: Roundtable Press Book. ISBN 0-8160-4374-4 (pbk).
