= Residence of the General =

Largest and best-preserved general office in China

The Residence of the General (Chinese: 将军衙署; pinyin: jiāng jun yá shǔ) is the largest and best-preserved general office in China of the highest ranking frontier garrison in Qing Dynasty. It was set up by the Qing Dynasty to enhance the stability of the northwest frontier, prevent the Junggar Division of Mongolia from invading the northwest frontier of the Qing Dynasty again, and protect the subjects. It is an important part of the Eight Banners garrison system. Since it was the residence of the garrison generals in Suiyuan City, it is called the General's Bureau, which has a history of more than 270 years and has important historical value.

== Decoration ==
The General's Bureau has a rigorous and symmetrical architectural style, which is in line with the specifications of the first-class government official. It covers an area of 30,000 square meters and has 132 houses. The existing buildings are divided into three categories, namely construction built in Qing Dynasty, construction in period of Republic and other buildings. The building complex consists of three parts, which are buildings on the left, buildings in the middle and buildings on the right. It is a rectangle with the length from north to south and the width from east to west.

== History ==
Since the Qing Dynasty, 78 generals have served here in the General's Bureau, which is the organization that has jurisdiction over the Eight Banners stationed in Suiyuan City, the Tumd Banner in Guihua City, the Wulanchabu League as well as the Ikh Juu League, and the control of Xuhuan and Datong's Green-Flag Army. Since its establishment, it has been the political and military center of Suiyuan ruled by the Qing government.
