= Zhaojun Tomb =

Tomb near Hohhot, Inner Mongolia

Coordinates: 40°42′28″N 111°41′01″E

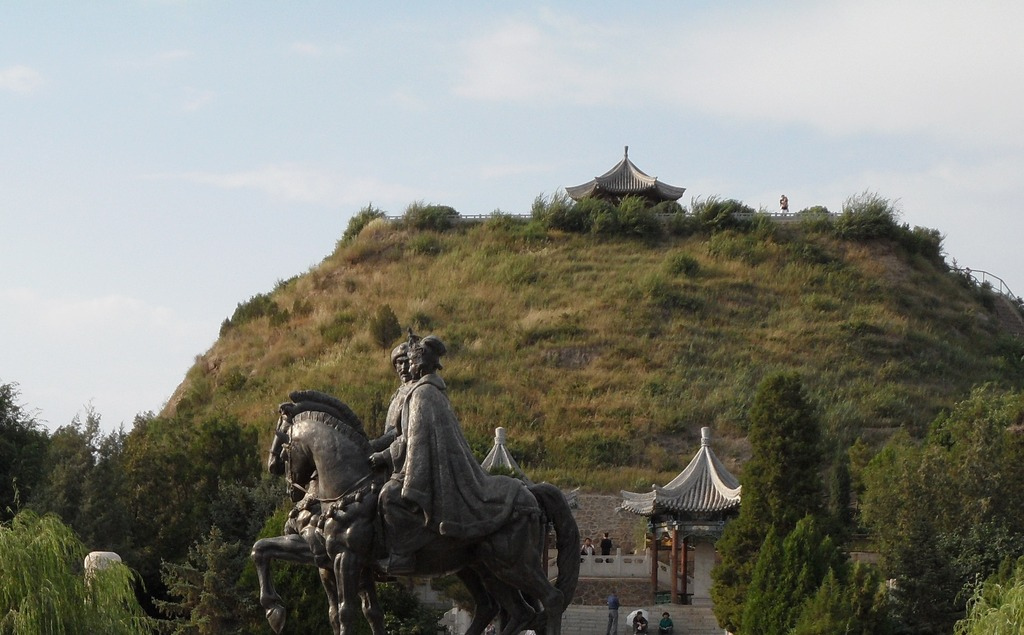
Tomb of Wang Zhaojun

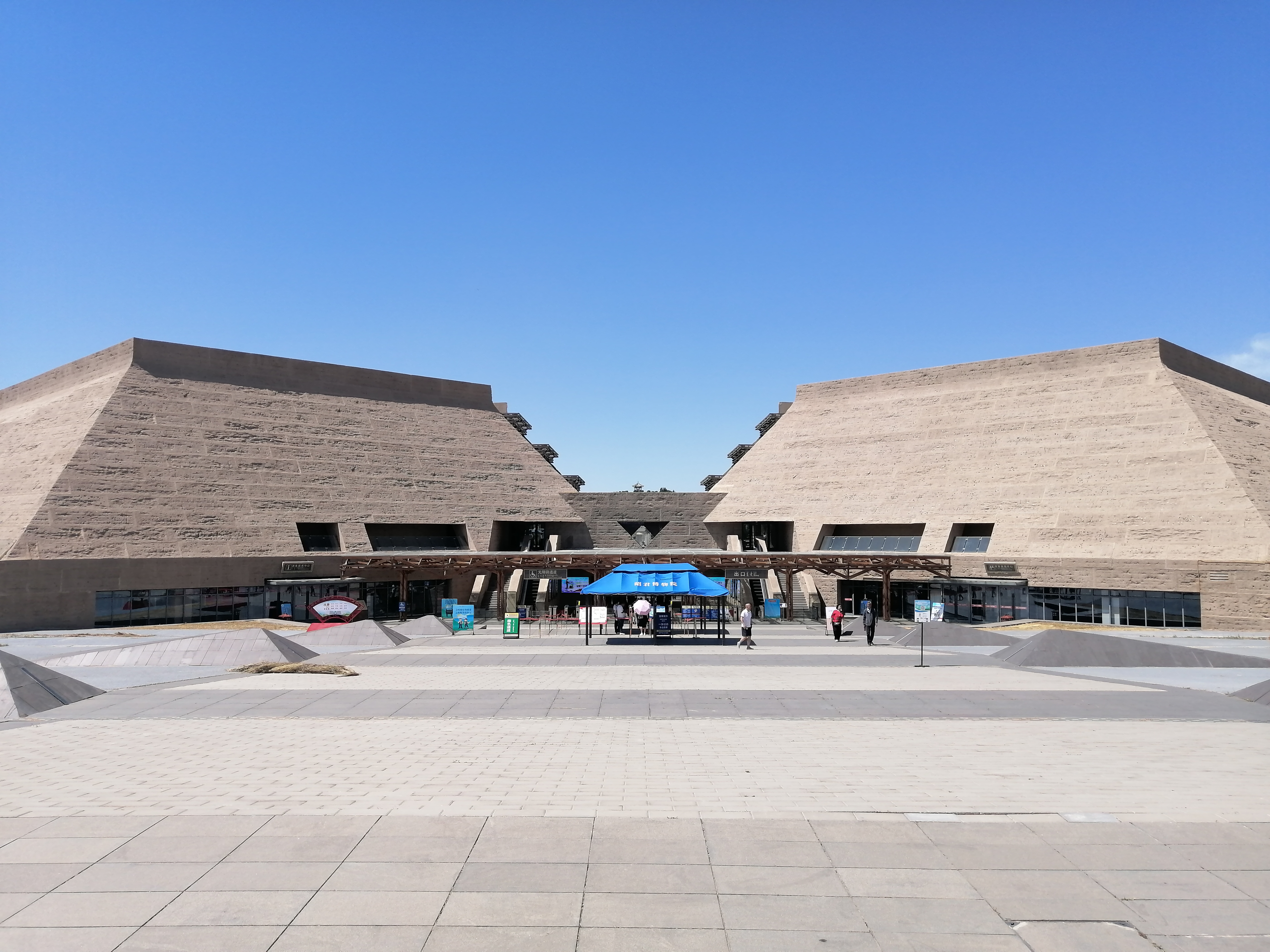
Zhaojun Museum, where the Zhaojun Tomb is located

The Zhaojun Tomb (Chinese: 昭君墓; pinyin: Zhāojūn Mù), located by the Da Hi River nine kilometers south of Hohhot, Inner Mongolia, is said to be the resting place of Wang Zhaojun, a commoner woman from the Han dynasty who married a Xiongnu Chanyu, nomadic chieftain from the steppes. The tomb is also referred to by its Mongolian name, Temür Urkhu (Chinese: 特木爾烏爾虎), meaning "Iron Wall". Another nickname, "Green Mound" (Chinese: 青塚; pinyin: Qīng Zhǒng), refers to a legend that in autumn, when grass and trees wither, those plants on the cemetery mound continue to prosper.

The tomb, one of the major attractions in the city of Hohhot, occupies some 13,000 m^{2} of land, with a 33-metre mound containing Zhaojun's coffin. The tomb is honorary, Wang Zhaojun is not actually buried here. Her true grave and cause of death is unknown. Still the "tomb" is visited by thousands of Chinese tourists each year and is noted for its attractive scenery.

The first Chinese mention of the cemetery in written record is in the Tang dynasty, by Du You (杜佑) in A Comprehensive Guide (通典). Former Chinese head of state Dong Biwu wrote the inscription on the entrance plaque to the tomb.
