= Wusutu Zhao Monastery =

Coordinates: 40°49′39″N 111°33′32″E

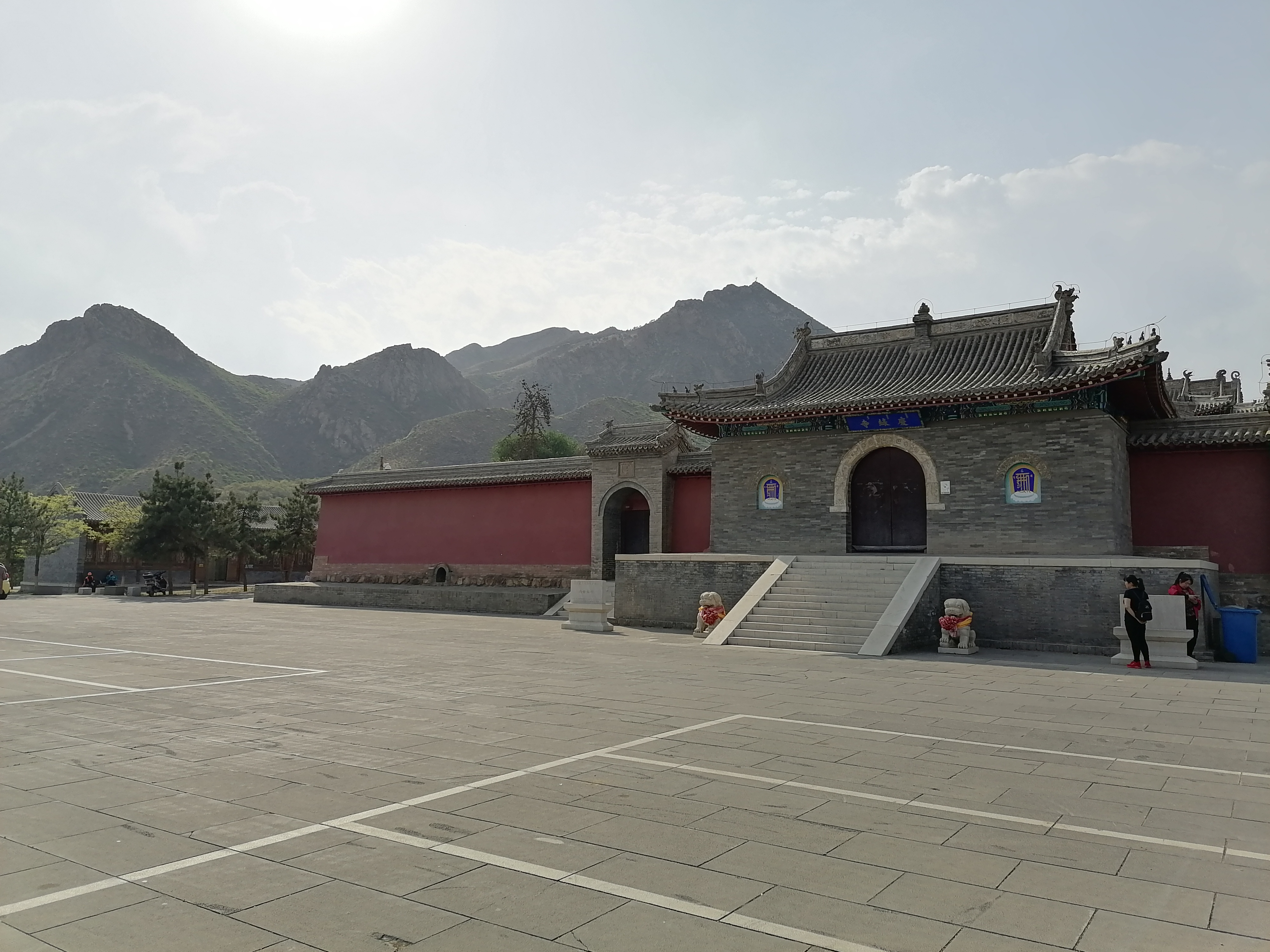

Religion
- Affiliation: Tibetan Buddhism
- Sect: Gelug

Location
- Location: Hohhot, Inner Mongolia, China
- Country: China
- Interactive map of Wusutu Zhao Monastery

Wusutu Zhao is a Tibetan Buddhist monastery in the city of Hohhot in Inner Mongolia in northern China.

Built in 1606 the predominantly Mongol styled architecture includes some Chinese and Tibetan features. Inside the monastery there are Ming dynasty murals on display as well as intricate woodcarvings with imperial dragon motifs.

The name Wusutu means "near to water" in Mongolian. The temple is located at the foot of the Daqing Mountains, near Xiwusutucun village.
