= Gold Horse International =

Chinese real estate Company

- Type: Public company
- Industry: Brick and mortar business
- Founded: 1980
- Headquarters: Hohhot, People's Republic of China
- Key people: Liankuan Yang CEO; Adam Wassermann CFO
- Products: Apartments
- Revenue: ▲US$ 37.63 million (2011)
- Number of employees: 136

Gold Horse International Inc. (GHII) is a Chinese real estate company based in Hohhot.

The company consists of two subsidiaries, namely Gold Horse International Inc. in Nevada, United States as well as Global Rise International Ltd.. It controls and operates various apartment buildings and hotels in the Inner Mongolian city of Hohhot in the People's Republic of China (PRC). Additionally, the company continuously finances and sells condominiums there. On behalf of Gold Horse International, the Jin Ma Construction Company Ltd. is assigned to develop and build new apartment buildings in Hohhot. Therefore, Gold Horse International has been capable to provide construction and general contractor services in Hohhot to private developers and especially to the local and regional Chinese governments for over three decades. Today, Gold Horse International has a quasi-monopoly on the housing market in the central and eastern part of Inner Mongolia.
