= Dazhao Temple (Hohhot) =

Gelug monastery of Hohhot, Inner Mongolia

Coordinates: 40°47′53″N 111°38′48″E

Dazhao
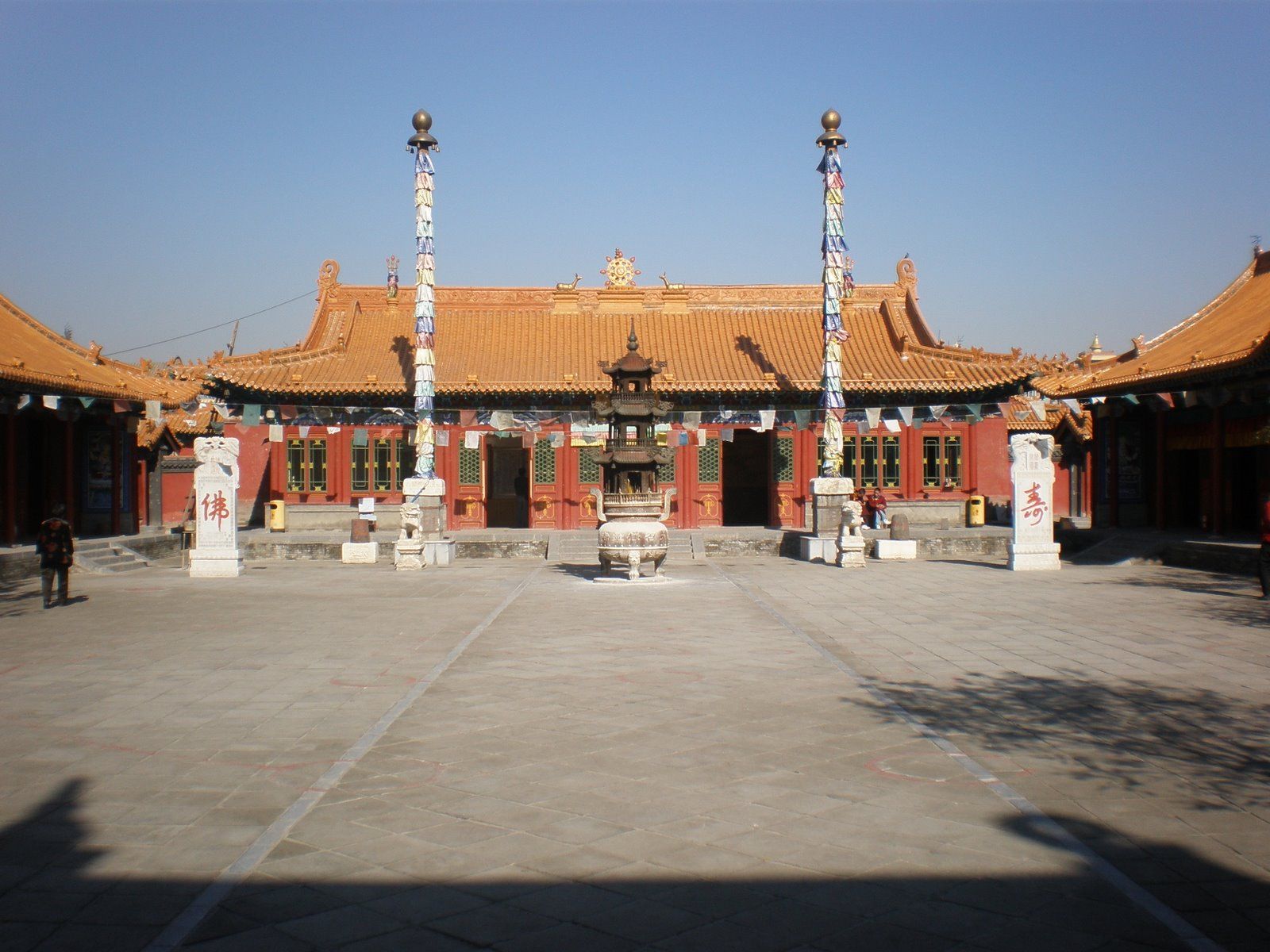

Religion
- Affiliation: Tibetan Buddhism
- Sect: Gelug

Location
- Location: Hohhot, Inner Mongolia, China
- Country: China
- Interactive map of Dazhao

Architecture
- Founder: Altan Khan
- Established: 1579 or 1580

Dazhao Temple

Chinese name
- Chinese: 大召寺
- Literal meaning: Great Juu (Mongolian Temple) Temple
Transcriptions
Standard Mandarin
- Hanyu Pinyin: Dàzhào Sì
- Wade–Giles: Ta-chao Ssu

Hongci Temple
- Chinese: 弘慈寺
- Literal meaning: Temple of Great Compassion
Transcriptions
Standard Mandarin
- Hanyu Pinyin: Hóngcí Sì
- Wade–Giles: Hung-tz'u Ssu

Wuliang Temple
- Traditional Chinese: 無量寺
- Simplified Chinese: 无量寺
- Literal meaning: Temple of Immeasurability; Immeasurable Temple
Transcriptions
Standard Mandarin
- Hanyu Pinyin: Wúliàng Sì
- Wade–Giles: Wu-liang Ssu

Silver Buddha Temple
- Traditional Chinese: 銀佛寺
- Simplified Chinese: 银佛寺
Transcriptions
Standard Mandarin
- Hanyu Pinyin: Yínfó Sì
- Wade–Giles: Yin-fo Ssu

Tibetan name
- Tibetan: དཔག་མེད་གླིང་།།
Transcriptions
- Wylie: dpag med gling

Mongolian name
- Mongolian script: ᠴᠠᠭᠯᠠᠰᠢ ᠦᠭᠡᠢ ᠰᠦᠮ᠎ᠡ
Transcriptions
- SASM/GNC: čaɣlasi ügei süm-e

Manchu name
- Manchu script: ᠵᡝᠴᡝᠨ ᠠᡴᡡ ᠰᡟ
- Romanization: ječen akū sy

Dazhao Temple, also known as the Hongci or Wuliang Temple and as the Ih Juu (Mongolian: ᠶᠡᠬᠡ
ᠵᠤᠤ Yeke Juu, SASM/GNC Ih Jûû, "Great Temple"), is a Tibetan Buddhist monastery of the Gelugpa order in the city of Hohhot in Inner Mongolia in North China. It is the oldest and largest temple in the city and is located West of Danan Street in the Yuquan District.

In 1557, when the Tümed Mongol leader Altan Khan began its construction, it was the first building of Hohhot; the rest of the city subsequently growing around it. The temple is said to have been completed in 1579 during the Ming dynasty.

The Dazhao Temple owes its fame to its astounding 10 ft (3.0 m) silver Sakyamuni Buddha statue. The 3rd Dalai Lama, Sonam Gyatso, visited the temple in 1586 and consecrated the silver Buddha statue. As a consequence, Hohhot became a religious center for people from all over Mongolia who came to receive its blessings.

The temple also has a shrine that was dedicated to the Kangxi Emperor in the late 17th century and murals in the hallway that commemorate his visit. Dazhao Temple also exhibits an impressive collection of musical instruments and dragon sculptures relating to Mongol legends.

The monastery is a venue for Buddhist festivals held throughout the year.

== Structure ==
The plane layout of Dazhao is in the form of Han Temple, covering an area of over 30,000 square meters, of which the building area is more than 8,000 square meters. The main buildings include Shanmen, Tianwang Hall, Bodhi Temple, Jiujian Building, Jingtang Hall and Buddhist Temple. Etc., where the hall and the Buddhist temple are linked together, collectively referred to as the "Dadian", the main hall is the only lama temple with the combination of Chinese and Tibetan styles in the entire temple. There is a double-decked three-story front hall, a guard hall and a Buddhist temple. There is a 2.55-meter-high silver Buddha statue in the middle of the Buddhist temple. Therefore, the Wuliang Temple is also known as the "Silver Buddha Temple". The front of the Silver Buddha is Tongtian column. There is a dragon plate on it. The left and right sides of the Silver Buddha are Tsongkhapa and the bronze statues of the Dalai Lama III and IV; in addition, under the eaves of the Dazhao Gate, there is the name of "The First Spring of the Jiubian". "The First Spring of the Jiubian" refers to the Yuquan Well before the Dazhao. It is said that the Kangxi Emperor was trying to calm the chaos of the Mongolian Oirat Ministry. The triumphant return came over the Dazhao, the horseshoes stepped on the ground, and there was a spring. Inscription on the inscription: Spring water "It is light and clear, its taste is sweet and beautiful."

== Decoration ==
There are Shanmen, Chudian, Jingtang, Jiujian building and Buddhist Temples in the buildings of Dazhao. Among them, the Hall and the Temple are closely linked together. They are commonly known as the Great Hall. There are statues and murals in the Buddha Hall. The silver Buddha image has undergone four hundred years of change, and it is still intact. The building of the Dazhao Temple is exquisite. The main hall is a common Tibetan-style lama temple system. The rest is built according to the style of traditional Chinese temples. The hall is dedicated to a silver-cast Buddha statue of Sakyamuni, so it is also called "Silver Buddha Temple". There are also many cultural relics in the collection, which is a precious material for studying Mongolian history and religious culture.

When the Shunzhi Emperor of the Qing dynasty greeted Lai V to Beijing, he rested in the Grand Call. After the Kangxi Emperor cast the "Emperor of the Emperor Long" gold medal for the Silver Buddha of the Great Hall, the Grand Call was honored as the "Emperor Temple."

During the reign of the Kangxi Emperor of the Qing dynasty (1662-1721), the scale of the temple was expanded, and the hall was changed to yellow glazed tiles. There is a 2.55-meter-high silver cast Sakyamuni statue in the Buddhist temple. There is a pair of golden woodcarving dragons in front of Sakyamuni, which lie on the wooden pillars. On the square of the white marble in front of the temple, there is a pair of hollow iron lions cast in the 7th year of the reign of the Qing Dynasty (AD 1627).

There are three tall statues of Buddhas and Bodhisattvas standing in the hall. There are huge paintings on the walls of the temple depicting Kangxi's private visit to Mingyue Building. Behind are the statues of Dalai IV, Tumote Mongolian Yundan Gyatso and Dalai V, two Buddha statues in the Ming and Qing Dynasties, two Buddha statues in woodcarving, two dragons in wood carvings, and 108 Ganzhuer Scripture. Copper casting gold plated instruments, medicines, etc. Under the front door of the hall, there is a pair of hollow iron lions that were minted in the 7th year of the reign (AD 1627), and they are proud of their artistic level. In the courtyard there is an iron incense burner cast in the Qing Dynasty, engraved with the name of a Mongolian craftsman.

== History ==
In the sixth year of Ming Wanli (AD 1578), Mongolian Tumut Aletan Khan greeted Tibet's Dalai III Saonan Gyatso to start the construction of the big call. In the second year, the Wanli Emperor gave the name "Hongci Temple", which was worshipped in the temple. Silver Sakyamuni image, also known as "Silver Buddha Temple"

The temple was built in the eighth year of Wanli (AD 1580) and was the earliest temple built in Hohhot. According to the report, after the construction of the temple, the Tumut Alatan Khan decided to build a second city temple. With the support of the Ming court, the seven years of Wanli (AD 1579) officially started construction. The newly built city temple separates the city from the temple. The temple is in the west of the city, and the second year is completed. The city is completed after another year. Ming Tingci Temple is named Hongci Temple, which is the Dazhao Temple. The city is named Guihua City, the old city of Hohhot.

In 1586, Dalai III came to Hohhot and visited the Grand Call. He presided over the Silver Buddha "Opening Fa Conference". Since then, Dazhao has become a famous monasteries in the Mongolian region. Mongolian ministries have sent people to Hohhot to pay homage. For example, in 1586, the Ark of the Khalkha Mongolian Moh, which was built in Mobei, was the drawing of the Hohhot Grand Call.

In 1640, the emperor Hong Taiji ordered the re-construction and expansion of the Grand Call. After the completion of the work, the emperor gave the temples of Manchu, Mongolian and Han, and the Chinese name "Hongci Temple" was changed to "Wuliang Temple". This is the origin of today's Dazhao Han name "Wuliang Temple". In 1652, the Dalai Lama of Tibet passed through Hohhot and was stationed in the Dazhao Temple. The bronze statue of Dalai Lama was also provided in the Dazhao Temple.

The Qing Dynasty's Hohhot Zasakda Lama Printing Office was opened in the Grand Salary. In 1698, the Kangxi Emperor appointed Nezito to the Lama at the Bada Temple in Hohhot. Nezitoin II invited the Kangxi Emperor to use his own temple property to repair the Dazhao. At that time, due to the disrepair of the Dazhao, the glazed tiles were damaged, and the hall was changed to yellow glazed tiles.

After the founding of the People's Republic of China, the Chinese government invested heavily in the large-scale repair of the Dazhao, and demolished the dilapidated houses and commercial buildings on the street around the temple, so that the Dazhao was on the side of the street and the two temples were magnificent. It reappeared the style of "zhao city" in the Ming and Qing dynasties.

== Cultural relics ==
The collections of Dazhao Temple are extremely rich. Silver Buddha, dragon carvings and murals are the three most famous cultural relics of Dazhao Temple. They are historical relics of the Ming dynasty and have a very high level of craftsmanship and ornamental value.

=== Silver Buddha ===
The Silver Buddha is a statue of Sakyamuni, which is enshrined in the Buddhist temple. It is made by Nepalese craftsmen and is made of 30,000 pure silver. It has been more than 400 years since it is one of the largest silver Buddhas in China. The Buddha statue is sitting up to 3 meters and is made of pure silver. According to historical records, when the Silver Buddha was completed in the same year, the Dalai Lama of the Republic of Tibet, Sonam Gyatso, visited the Grand Call and held the "Opening Fa Conference" for the Silver Buddha. Dazhao also has the title of "Silver Buddha Temple".

=== Dragon sculpture ===
The dragon carving refers to the two vivid golden dragons in front of the silver Buddha. The height is about 10 meters. They are carved on two Tongtian columns. They are viewed from the bottom, the double dragons are flying, the claws are dancing, and the cloth is hovering. The dragon's sculptures are powerful, showing the exquisite craftsmanship of the dragon carving art of the Ming Dynasty. According to legend, it is made of clay and slurry stone. The craft is very elegant and it is the best in the temple.

=== Mural ===
A mural is a major feature of the big call. The theme is rich and the picture is vivid. The content is based on Buddhist figures and stories, depicting various scenes of heaven, earth and hell. Among them, the Buddha is the most exquisite and fascinating. The picture is both coherent and independent. The whole picture shows more than 770 people, such as the god Buddha and the mortal. The scene is grand and quite spectacular, reflecting the superb level of Chinese Ming Dynasty painting art. The large-scale murals are drawn in natural stone, and although it has been going on for centuries, it is still beautiful.
