= Modern Hebrew grammar =

Grammatical rules of the modern-day Hebrew language

The grammar of Modern Hebrew shares similarities with that of its Biblical Hebrew counterpart, but it has evolved significantly over time. Modern Hebrew grammar incorporates analytic constructions, expressing such forms as dative, allative, and accusative using prepositional particles rather than morphological cases.

Modern Hebrew grammar is also fusional synthetic: inflection plays a role in the formation of verbs and nouns (using non-concatenative discontinuous morphemes realised by vowel transfixation) and the declension of prepositions (i.e. with pronominal suffixes).

== Representation of Hebrew examples ==
Examples of Hebrew here are represented using the International Phonetic Alphabet (IPA) as well as native script. Although most speakers collapse the phonemes /ħ, ʕ/ into /χ, ʔ/, the distinction is maintained by a limited number of speakers and will therefore be indicated here for maximum coverage. In the transcriptions, /r/ is used for the rhotic, which in Modern Hebrew phonology is more commonly a lax voiced uvular approximant [ʁ].

Hebrew is written from right to left.

== Syntax ==
Every Hebrew sentence must contain at least one subject, at least one predicate, usually but not always a verb, and possibly other arguments and complements.

Word order in Modern Hebrew is somewhat similar to that in English: as opposed to Biblical Hebrew, where the word order is verb-subject-object, the usual word order in Modern Hebrew is subject-verb-object. Thus, if there is no case marking, one can resort to the word order. Modern Hebrew is characterized by an asymmetry between definite objects and indefinite objects. There is an accusative marker, et, only before a definite object (mostly a definite noun or personal name). Et-ha is currently undergoing fusion and reduction to become ta.Consider ten li et ha-séfer ("give:2ndPerson.Masculine.Singular.Imperative to-me ACCUSATIVE the-book"), meaning "Give me the book," where et, though functioning syntactically as a case marker, is formally a preposition, and ha is the definite article. This sentence is realised phonetically as ten li ta-séfer.

=== Sentences with finite verbs ===
In sentences where the predicate is a verb, the word order is usually subject–verb–object (SVO), as in English. However, word order can change in the following instances:

- An object can typically be topicalized by moving it to the front of the sentence. When the object is a question word, this topicalization is almost mandatory. Example: לְמִי אָמַר? /leˈmi ʔaˈmar?/, literally "To-whom he-told?", means "Whom did he tell?" In other cases, this topicalization can be used for emphasis.
- Hebrew is a partly pro-drop language. This means that subject pronouns are sometimes omitted when verb conjugations are able to reflect gender, number, and person; otherwise the subject pronouns should be mentioned. Specifically, subject pronouns are always used with verbs in the present tense because present forms of verbs don't reflect person.
- Indefinite subjects (like English's a boy, a book, and so on) are often postponed, giving the sentence some of the sense of "there exists [subject]" in addition to the verb's normal meaning. For example, פָּנָה אֵלַי אֵיזֶשֶׁהוּ אָדָם שִׁבִּקֵּשׁ שֶׁאֶעֱזֹר לוֹ עִם מַשֶּׁהוּ /paˈna ʔeˈlaj ˈʔezeʃehu ʔaˈdam, ʃe-biˈkeʃ ʃe-ʔe.ʕeˈzor lo ʕim ˈmaʃehu/, literally "Turned to-me some man that-asked that-[I]-will-help to-him with something", means "A man came to me wanting me to help him with something." This serves a purpose somewhat analogous to English's narrative use of this with a semantically indefinite subject: "So, I'm at work, and this man comes up to me and asks me to help him." Indeed, outside of the present tense, mere existence is expressed using the verb to be with a postponed indefinite subject. Example: הָיְתָה סִבָּה שֶׁבִּקַּשְׁתִּי /hajˈta siˈba ʃe-biˈkaʃti/, literally "Was reason that-[I]-asked", means "There was a reason I asked."
- Definite subjects can be postponed for a number of reasons.
  - In some cases, a postponed subject can be used to sound formal or archaic. This is because historically, Hebrew was typically verb–subject–object (VSO). The Bible and other religious texts are predominantly written in VSO word order.
  - Sometimes, postponing a subject can give it emphasis. One response to הַתְחֵל /hatˈħel!/ ("Start") might be הַתְחֵל אַתָּה /hatˈħel aˈta!/ ("You start!").
  - A subject might initially be omitted and then added later as an afterthought, such as נַעֲשֶׂה אֶת זֶה בְּיַחַד אַתָּה וַאֲנִי /naʕaˈse ʔet ˈze beˈjaħad, aˈta vaʔanˈi/, literally "[We]'ll-do it together, you and-I", means "You and I will do it together" or "We'll do it together, you and I".

Generally, Hebrew marks every noun in a sentence with some sort of preposition, with the exception of subjects and semantically indefinite direct objects. Unlike English, indirect objects require prepositions (Hebrew "הוּא נָתַן לִי אֶת הַכַּדּוּר" /hu naˈtan li ʔet ha-kaˈdur/ (literally "he gave to-me direct-object-marker the ball) in contrast to English "He gave me the ball") and semantically definite direct objects are introduced by the preposition את /et/ (Hebrew "הוּא נָתַן לִי אֶת הַכַּדּוּר" /hu naˈtan li ʔet ha-kaˈdur/ (literally "he gave to-me direct-object-marker the ball) in contrast to English "He gave me the ball").

=== Nominal sentences ===
Hebrew also produces sentences where the predicate is not a finite verb. A sentence of this type is called משפט שמני /miʃˈpat ʃemaˈni/, a nominal sentence. These sentences contain a subject, a non-verbal predicate, and an optional copula. Types of copulae include:

- The verb להיות /lihiyot/ (to be):

While the verb to be does have present-tense forms, they are used only in exceptional circumstances. The following structures are used instead:
- While the past and future tenses follow the structure [sometimes-optional subject]-[form of to be]-[noun complement] (analogous to English, except that in English the subject is always mandatory), the present tense follows [optional subject]-[subject pronoun]-[noun complement].

- אַבָּא שֶׁלִּי הָיָה שׁוֹטֵר בִּצְעִירוּתוֹ. /ˈʔaba ʃeˈli haˈja ʃoˈter bi-t͡sʕiruˈto/ (my father was a policeman when he was young.)
- הַבֵּן שֶׁלּוֹ הוּא אַבָּא שֶׁלָּהּ. /ha-ˈben ʃeˈlo hu ˈʔaba ʃeˈlah/ (literally "the-son of-his he the-father of-hers", his son is her father.)
- יוֹסִי יִהְיֶה כִימָאִי. /ˈjosi jihˈje χimaˈʔi/ (Yossi will be a chemist)

- While לֹא /lo/ ("not") precedes the copula in the past and future tenses, it follows the copula (a subject pronoun) in the present tense.
- Where the past and future tenses are structured as [optional subject]-[form of to be]-[adjective complement] (analogous to English, except that in English the subject is mandatory), the present tense is simply [subject]-[adjective complement]. For example, הַדֶּלֶת סְגוּרָה /ha-ˈdelet sɡuˈra/, literally "the-door closed", means "the door is closed." That said, additional subject pronouns are sometimes used, as with noun complements, especially with complicated subjects. Example: זֶה מוּזָר שֶׁהוּא אָמַר כָּךְ /ze muˈzar ʃe-hu ʔaˈmar kaχ/, literally " it strange that-he said thus", means "that he said that is strange," i.e. "it's strange that he said that."

- The verbs הָפַךְ /haˈfaχ/, נֶהֱפַךְ /neheˈfaχ/ and נִהְיָה /nihˈja/ (to become):

When the sentence implies progression or change, the said verbs are used and considered copulae between the nominal subject and the non-verbal predicate. For instance:
- הַכֶּלֶב נִהְיָה עַצְבָּנִי יוֹתֵר מֵרֶגַע לְרֶגַע haˈkelev nihˈja ʕat͡sbaˈni joˈter me-ˈregaʕ le-ˈregaʕ/ (The dog became more angry with every passing moment)
- הֶחָבֵר שֶׁלִּי נֶהֱפַךְ לְמִפְלֶצֶת! /he-ħaˈver ʃeˈli neheˈfaχ le-mifˈlet͡set!/ (My friend has become a monster!)

- Possession / existence: יש/אין /jeʃ/en/:

Possession in Hebrew is constructed indefinitely. There is no Hebrew translation to the English verb "to have," common in many Indo-European languages to express possession as well as to serve as a helping verb. To express the English sentence "I have a dog" in Hebrew is "יֵשׁ לִי כֶּלֶב",ˈ/jeːʃ ˈliː ˈkelev/, literally meaning "there exists to me a dog." The word יֵשׁ /jeʃ/ expresses existence in the present tense, and is unique in the Hebrew language as a verb-like form with no inflected qualities at all. Dispossession in the present tense in Hebrew is expressed with the antithesis to יש, which is אֵין /en/ – "אֵין לִי כֶּלֶב" /en li ˈkelev/ means "I do not have a dog." Possession in the past and the future in Hebrew is also expressed impersonally, but uses conjugated forms of the Hebrew copula, לִהְיוֹת [lihyot]. For example, the same sentence "I do not have a dog" would in the past tense become "לֹא הָיָה לִי כֶּלֶב" /lo haja li kelev/, literally meaning "there was not to me a dog."

=== Sentence types ===
Sentences are generally divided into three types:

==== Simple sentence ====
A simple sentence is a sentence that contains one subject, one verb, and optional objects. As the name implies, it is the simplest type of sentence.

==== Compound sentences ====
Two or more sentences that do not share common parts and can be separated by comma are called מִשְפָּט מְחֻבָּר /miʃˈpat meħuˈbar/, a compound sentence. In many cases, the second sentence uses a pronoun that stands for the other's subject; they are generally interconnected. The two sentences are linked with a coordinating conjunction (מִלַּת חִבּוּר /miˈlat ħiˈbur/). The conjunction is a stand-alone word that serves as a connection between both parts of the sentence, belonging to neither part.

- לֹא אָכַלְתִּי כָּל הַיּוֹם, וְלָכֵן בְּסוֹף הַיּוֹם הָיִיתִי מוּתָשׁ. /lo ʔaˈχalti kol ha-ˈjom, ve-laˈχen be-ˈsof ha-ˈjom haˈjiti muˈtaʃ/ (I haven't eaten all day, therefore at the end of the day I was exhausted.)

Both parts of the sentence can be separated by a period and stand alone as grammatically correct sentences, which makes the sentence a compound sentence (and not a complex sentence):
לֹא אָכַלְתִּי כָּל הַיּוֹם. בְּסוֹף הַיּוֹם הָיִיתִי מוּתָשׁ. /lo ʔaˈχalti kol ha-ˈjom. be-ˈsof ha-ˈjom haˈjiti muˈtaʃ./ (I haven't eaten all day. By the end of the day I was exhausted.)

==== Complex sentences ====
Like English, Hebrew allows clauses, פְּסוּקִיּוֹת /psukiˈjot/ (sing. פְּסוּקִית /psuˈkit/), to serve as parts of a sentence. A sentence containing a subordinate clause is called משפט מרכב /miʃˈpat murˈkav/, or a complex sentence. Subordinate clauses almost always begin with the subordinating conjunction שֶׁ־ /ʃe-/ (usually that), which attaches as a prefix to the word that follows it. For example, in the sentence יוֹסִי אוֹמֵר שֶׁהוּא אוֹכֵל /ˈjosi ʔoˈmer ʃe-ˈhu ʔoˈχel/ (Yossi says that he is eating), the subordinate clause שֶׁהוּא אוֹכֵל /ʃe-ˈhu ʔoˈχel/ (that he is eating) serves as the direct object of the verb אוֹמֵר /ʔoˈmer/ (says). Unlike English, Hebrew does not have a large number of subordinating conjunctions; rather, subordinate clauses almost always act as nouns and can be introduced by prepositions in order to serve as adverbs. For example, the English As I said, there's nothing we can do in Hebrew is כְּפִי שֶׁאָמַרְתִּי, אֵין מָה לַעֲשׂוֹת /kfi ʃe-ʔaˈmarti, ʔen ma laʕaˈsot/ (literally As that-I-said, there-isn't what to-do).

That said, relative clauses, which act as adjectives, are also formed using שֶׁ־ /ʃe-/. For example, English Yosi sees the man who is eating apples is in Hebrew יוֹסִי רוֹאֶה אֶת הָאִישׁ שֶׁאוֹכֵל תַּפּוּחִים /ˈjosi roˈʔe ʔet ha-ˈʔiʃ ʃe-ʔoˈχel tapuˈħim/ (literally Yosi sees [et] the-man that-eats apples). In this use שֶׁ־ /ʃe-/ sometimes acts as a relativizer rather than as a relative pronoun; that is, sometimes the pronoun remains behind in the clause: הִיא מַכִּירָה אֶת הָאִישׁ שֶׁדִּבַּרְתִּי עָלָיו /hi makiˈra ʔet ha-ˈʔiʃ ʃe-diˈbarti ʕaˈlav/, which translates to She knows the man I talked about, literally means She knows [et] the-man that-I-talked about him. This is because in Hebrew, a preposition (in this case על /ʕal/) cannot appear without its object, so the him -יו (/-av/) could not be dropped. However, some sentences, such as the above example, can be written both with relativizers and with relative pronouns. The sentence can also be rearranged into הִיא מַכִּירָה אֶת הָאִישׁ עָלָיו דִבַּרְתִּי /hi makiˈra ʔet ha-ˈʔiʃ ʕaˈlav diˈbarti/, literally She knows [et] the-man about him I-talked., and translates into the same meaning. In that example, the preposition and its object עָלָיו /ʕaˈlav/ also act as a relative pronoun, without use of שֶׁ־ /ʃe-/.

==== Impersonal sentences ====
A sentence may lack a determinate subject, then it is called מִשְפָּט סְתָמִי /miʃˈpat staˈmi/, an indefinite or impersonal sentence. These are used in order to put emphasis on the action, and not on the agent of the action. Usually the verb is of the 3rd person plural form.

- עָשׂוּ שִׁפּוּץ בַּבִּנְיָן שֶׁלִּי /ʕaˈsu ʃipˈut͡s ba-binˈjan ʃeˈli/ (literally: they-made a renovation in-the building of-mine; my building was renovated)

==== Collective sentences ====
When a sentence contains multiple parts of the same grammatical function and relate to the same part of the sentence, they are called collective parts. They are usually separated with the preposition וְ- /ve-/ (and), and if there are more than two, they are separated with commas while the last pair with the preposition, as in English. Collective parts can have any grammatical function in the sentence, for instance:

- Subject:

אָדָם, אַיָּה וַאֲנִי אָכַלְנוּ יַחַד בְּמִסְעָדָה.
/ʔaˈdam, ʔaˈja va-ʔani ʔaˈχalnu ˈjaħad be-misʕaˈda./
Adam, Aya and I ate at a restaurant together.

- Predicate:

מִיכַל אָכְלָה וְשָׁתְתָה הַרְבֵּה אֶתְמוֹל.
/miˈχal ʔaχˈla ve-ʃateˈta harˈbe ʔetˈmol/
Michal ate and drank a lot yesterday.

- Direct object:

בִּשַּׁלְתִּי אֶת הַגֶּזֶר, אֶת הַבָּטָטָה וְאֶת תַּפּוּחַ הָאֲדָמָה שֶׁקְּנִיתֶם שָׁבוּעַ שֶׁעָבַר לַאֲרוּחַת הָעֶרֶב הַיּוֹם.
/biˈʃalti ʔet ha-ˈgezer, ʔet ha-baˈtata ve-ʔet taˈpu.aħ ha-ʔadaˈma ʃe-kniˈtem ʃaˈvu.aʕ ʃe-ʕaˈvar la-ʔaruˈħat ha-ˈʕerev ha'jom./
I cooked the carrots, the sweet potatoes and the potatoes you bought last week for dinner today.

- Indirect object:

הַמּוֹרָה תִּתֵּן לְתֹמֶר וְלִי אִשּׁוּר.
/ha-moˈra tiˈten le-toˈmer ve-li ʔiˈʃur/
The teacher will give Tomer and me permission.

When a collective part is preceded by a preposition, the preposition must be copied onto all parts of the collective.

== Verbs ==
Hebrew verbs (פועל /ˈpoʕal/) utilize nonconcatenative morphology extensively, meaning they rely much more on internal structure to convey meaning than most other languages, which more often use prefixes or suffixes. Every Hebrew verb is formed by casting a three- or four-consonant root (שֹׁרֶשׁ /ˈʃoreʃ/) into one of seven derived stems called /binjaˈnim/ (בִּנְיָנִים, meaning buildings or constructions; the singular is בִּנְיָן /binˈjan/, written henceforth as binyan). Most roots can be cast into more than one binyan, meaning more than one verb can be formed from a typical root. When this is the case, the different verbs are usually related in meaning, typically differing in voice, valency, semantic intensity, aspect, or a combination of these features. The "concept" of the Hebrew verb's meaning is defined by the identity of the triliteral root. The "concept" of the Hebrew verb assumes verbal meaning by taking on vowel-structure as dictated by the binyan's rules.

=== Conjugation ===
Each binyan has a certain pattern of conjugation and verbs in the same binyan are conjugated similarly. Conjugation patterns within a binyan alter somewhat depending on certain phonological qualities of the verb's root; the alterations (called גִּזְרָה [ɡizra], meaning "form") are defined by the presence of certain letters composing the root. For example, three-letter roots (triliterals) whose second letter is ו /vav/ or י /jud/ are so-called hollow or weak roots, losing their second letter in binyan הִפְעִיל /hifˈʕil/, in הֻפְעַל /hufˈʕal/, and in much of פָּעַל /paʕal/. The feature of being conjugated differently because the second root-letter is ו or י is an example of a gizra. These verbs are not strictly irregular verbs, because all Hebrew verbs that possess the same feature of the gizra are conjugated in accordance with the gizra's particular set of rules.

Every verb has a past tense, a present tense, and a future tense, with the present tense doubling as a present participle. Other forms also exist for certain verbs: verbs in five of the binyanim have an imperative mood and an infinitive, verbs in four of the binyanim have gerunds, and verbs in one of the binyanim have a past participle. Finally, a very small number of fixed expressions include verbs in the jussive mood, which is essentially an extension of the imperative into the third person. Except for the infinitive and gerund, these forms are conjugated to reflect the number (singular or plural), person (first, second, or third) and gender (masculine or feminine) of its subject, depending on the form. Modern Hebrew also has an analytic conditional~past-habitual mood expressed with the auxiliary haya.

In listings such as dictionaries, Hebrew verbs are sorted by their third-person masculine singular past tense form. This differs from English verbs, which are identified by their infinitives. (Nonetheless, the Hebrew term for infinitive is shem poʕal, which means verb name.) Further, each of the seven binyanim is identified by the third-person masculine singular past tense form of the root פ־ע־ל (P-ʕ-L, meaning doing, action, etc.) cast into that binyan: פָּעַל /ˈpaʕal/, נִפְעַל /nifˈʕal/, פִּעֵל /piˈʕel/, פֻּעַל /puˈʕal/, הִפְעִיל /hifˈʕil/, הֻפְעַל /hufˈʕal/, and הִתְפַּעֵל /hitpaˈʕel/.

=== Binyan פָּעַל /paʕal/ ===
Binyan paʕal, also called binyan קַל or qal /qal/ (light), is the most common binyan. Paʕal verbs are in the active voice, and can be either transitive or intransitive. This means that they may or may not take direct objects. Paʕal verbs are never formed from four-letter roots.

Binyan paʕal is the only binyan in which a given root can have both an active and a passive participle. For example, רָצוּי /raˈt͡suj/ (desirable) is the passive participle of רָצָה /raˈt͡sa/ (want).

Binyan paʕal has the most diverse number of gzarot (pl. of gizra), and the small number of Hebrew verbs that are strictly irregular (about six to ten) are generally considered to be part of the pa'al binyan, as they have some conjugation features similar to paʕal.

=== Binyan נִפְעַל /nifˈʕal/ ===
Verbs in binyan nifal are always intransitive, but beyond that there is little restriction on their range of meanings.

The nifal is the passive-voice counterpart of paal. In principle, any transitive paal verb can be rendered passive by taking its root and casting it into nifal. Nonetheless, this is not nifʕal's main use, as the passive voice is fairly rare in ordinary Modern Hebrew.

More commonly, it is paal's middle- or reflexive-voice counterpart. Ergative verbs in English often translate into Hebrew as a paal–nifal pair. For example, English he broke the plate corresponds to Hebrew הוּא שָׁבַר אֶת הַצַּלַּחַת /hu ʃaˈvar et ha-t͡saˈlaħat/, using paa'al; but English the plate broke corresponds to Hebrew הַצַּלַּחַת נִשְׁבְּרָה /ha-t͡saˈlaħat niʃbeˈra/, using nifal. The difference is that in the first case, there is an agent doing the breaking (active), while in the second case, the agent is ignored (although the object is acted upon; passive). (Nonetheless, as in English, it can still be made clear that there was an ultimate agent: הוּא הִפִּיל אֶת הַצַּלַּחַת וְהִיא נִשְׁבְּרָה /hu hiˈpil ʔet ha-t͡saˈlaħat ve-hi niʃbeˈra/, he dropped the plate and it broke, uses nif'al.) Other examples of this kind include פָּתַח /paˈtaħ//נִפְתַּח /nifˈtaħ/ (to open, transitive/intransitive) and גָּמַר /ɡaˈmar//נִגְמַר /niɡˈmar/ (to end, transitive/intransitive).

Other relationships between a paa'al verb and its nifa'al counterpart can exist as well. One example is זָכַר /zaˈχar/ and נִזְכַּר /nizˈkar/: both mean to remember, but the latter implies that one had previously forgotten, rather like English to suddenly remember. Another is פָּגַשׁ /paˈɡaʃ/ and נִפְגַּשׁ /nifˈɡaʃ/: both mean to meet, but the latter implies an intentional meeting, while the former often means an accidental meeting.

Finally, sometimes a nifal verb has no pa'al counterpart, or at least is much more common than its paʕal counterpart; נִדְבַּק /nidˈbak/ (to stick, intransitive) is a fairly common verb, but דָּבַק /daˈvak/ (to cling) is all but non-existent by comparison. (Indeed, נִדְבַּק /nidˈbak/'s transitive counterpart is הִדְבִּיק /hidˈbik/, of binyan hifʕil; see below.)

Like pa'al verbs, nifal verbs are never formed from four-letter roots.

Nifal verbs, unlike verbs in the other passive binyanim (pua'al and hufa'al, described below), do have gerunds, infinitives and imperatives.

=== Binyan פִּעֵל /piˈʕel/ ===
Binyan pi'el, like binyan pa'al, consists of transitive and intransitive verbs in the active voice, though there is perhaps a greater tendency for piʕel verbs to be transitive.

Most roots with a pa'al verb do not have a piʕel verb, and vice versa, but even so, there are many roots that do have both. Sometimes the pi'el verb is a more intense version of the paʕal verb; for example, קִפֵּץ /kiˈpet͡s/ (to spring) is a more intense version of קָפַץ /kaˈfat͡s/ (to jump), and שִׁבֵּר /ʃiˈber/ (to smash, to shatter, transitive) is a more intense version of שָׁבַר /ʃaˈvar/ (to break, transitive). In other cases, a piʕel verb acts as a causative counterpart to the pa'al verb with the same root; for example, לִמֵּד /liˈmed/ (to teach) is essentially the causative of לָמַד /laˈmad/ (to learn). And in yet other cases, the nature of the relationship is less obvious; for example, סִפֵּר /siˈper/ means to tell / to narrate or to cut hair, while סָפַר /saˈfar/ means to count, and פִּתֵּחַ /piˈte.aħ/ means to develop (transitive verb), while פָּתַח /paˈtaħ/ means to open (transitive verb).

=== Binyan פֻּעַל /puˈʕal/ ===
Binyan puʕal is the passive-voice counterpart of binyan piʕel. Unlike binyan nifʕal, it is used only for the passive voice. It is therefore not very commonly used in ordinary speech, except that the present participles of a number of puʕal verbs are used as ordinary adjectives: מְבֻלְבָּל /mevulˈbal/ means mixed-up (from בֻּלְבַּל /bulˈbal/, the passive of בִּלְבֵּל /bilˈbel/, to confuse), מְעֻנְיָן /meunˈjan/ means interested, מְפֻרְסָם /mefurˈsam/ means famous (from פֻּרְסַם /purˈsam/, the passive of פִּרְסֵם /pirˈsem/, to publicize), and so on. Indeed, the same is true of many piʕel verbs, including the piʕel counterparts of two of the above examples: מְבַלְבֵּל /mevalˈbel/, confusing, and מְעַנְיֵן /meʕanˈjen/, interesting. The difference is that piʕel verbs are also frequently used as verbs, whereas puʕal is much less common.

Puʕal verbs do not have gerunds, imperatives, or infinitives.

=== Binyan הִפְעִיל /hifˈʕil/ ===
Binyan hifʕil is another active binyan. Hifʕil verbs are often causative counterparts of verbs in other binyanim; examples include הִכְתִּיב /hiχˈtiv/ (to dictate; the causative of כָּתַב /kaˈtav/, to write), הִדְלִיק /hidˈlik/ (to turn on (a light), transitive; the causative of נִדְלַק /nidˈlak/, (for a light) to turn on, intransitive), and הִרְשִׁים /hirˈʃim/ (to impress; the causative of התרשם /hitraˈʃem/, to be impressed). Nonetheless, not all are causatives of other verbs; for example, הִבְטִיחַ /hivˈtiaħ/ (to promise).

=== Binyan הֻפְעַל /hufˈʕal/ ===
Binyan huf'al is much like binyan pu'al, except that it corresponds to hif'il instead of to pi'el. Like pu'al, it is not commonly used in ordinary speech, except in present participles that have become adjectives, such as מֻכָּר /muˈkar/ (familiar, from הֻכַּר /huˈkar/, the passive of הִכִּיר /hiˈkir/, to know (a person)) and מֻגְזָם /muɡˈzam/ (excessive, from /huɡˈzam/, the passive of הִגְזִים /hiɡˈzim/, to exaggerate). Like puʕal verbs, hufʕal verbs do not have gerunds, imperatives, or infinitives.

=== Binyan הִתְפַּעֵל /hitpaˈʕel/ ===
Binyan hitpa'el is rather like binyan nif'al, in that all hitpa'el verbs are intransitive, and most have a reflexive sense. Indeed, many hitpa'el verbs are reflexive counterparts to other verbs with the same root; for example, הִתְרַחֵץ /hitraˈħet͡s/ (to wash oneself) is the reflexive of רָחַץ /raˈħat͡s/ (to wash, transitive), and הִתְגַּלֵּחַ /hitɡaˈleaħ/ (to shave oneself, i.e. to shave, intransitive) is the reflexive of גִּלֵּחַ /ɡiˈleaħ/ (to shave, transitive). Some hitpaʕel verbs are a combination of causative and reflexive; for example, הִסְתַּפֵּר /histaˈper/ (to get one's hair cut) is the causative reflexive of סִפֵּר /siˈper/ (to cut (hair)), and הִצְטַלֵּם /hit͡staˈlem/ (to get one's picture taken) is the causative reflexive of צִלֵּם /t͡siˈlem/ (to take a picture (of someone or something)).

Hitpa'el verbs can also be reciprocal; for example, הִתְכַּתֵּב /hitkaˈtev/ (to write to each other, i.e. to correspond) is the reciprocal of כָּתַב /kaˈtav/ (to write).

In all of the above uses, the hitpa'el verb contrasts with a pu'al or huf'al verb in two ways: firstly, the subject of the hitpa'el verb is generally either performing the action, or at least complicit in it, whereas the subject of the pu'al or huf'al verb is generally not; and secondly, pu'al and huf'al verbs often convey a sense of completeness, which hitpa'el verbs generally do not. So whereas the sentence אֲנִי מְצֻלָּם /aˈni met͡suˈlam/ (I am photographed, using pu'al) means something like there exists a photo of me, implying that the photo already exists, and not specifying whether the speaker caused the photo to be taken, the sentence אֲנִי מִצְטַלֵּם /aˈni mit͡staˈlem/ (I am photographed, using hitpa'el) means something like I'm having my picture taken, implying that the picture does not exist yet, and that the speaker is causing the picture to be taken.

In other cases, hitpa'el verbs are ordinary intransitive verbs; for example, התנהג /hitnaˈheɡ/ (to behave), structurally is the reciprocal of נהג /naˈhaɡ/ (to act), as in נְהַג בְּחָכְמָה /neˈhag be-ħoχˈma/ (act wisely). However, it is used sparsely, only in sayings as such, and the more common meaning of nahaɡ is to drive; for that meaning, הִתְנַהֵג /hitnaˈheɡ/ is not a reciprocal form, but a separate verb in effect. For example: in talking about a car that drives itself, one would say מְכוֹנִית שֶׁנּוֹהֶגֶת אֶת עַצְמָהּ /meχoˈnit ʃe-noˈheɡet ʔet ʕat͡sˈmah/ (a car that drives itself, using nahag), not מְכוֹנִית שֶׁמִּתְנַהֶגֶת /meχoˈnit ʃe-mitnaˈheɡet/ (a car that behaves, using hitnaheg).

== Nouns ==
The Hebrew noun (שֵׁם עֶצֶם /ʃem ʕet͡sem/) is inflected for number and state, but not for case and therefore Hebrew nominal structure is normally not considered to be strictly declensional. Nouns are generally related to verbs (by shared roots), but their formation is not as systematic, often due to loanwords from foreign languages. Hebrew nouns are also inflected for definiteness by application of the prefix ַה (ha) before the given noun. Semantically, the prefix "ha" corresponds roughly to the English word "the".

=== Gender: masculine and feminine ===
Every noun in Hebrew has a gender, either masculine or feminine (or both); for example, סֵפֶר /ˈsefer/ (book) is masculine, דֶּלֶת /ˈdelet/ (door) is feminine, and סַכִּין /saˈkin/ (knife) is both. There is no strict system of formal gender, but there is a tendency for nouns ending in ת (/-t/) or ה (usually /-a/) to be feminine and for nouns ending in other letters to be masculine. There is a very strong tendency toward natural gender for nouns referring to people and some animals. Such nouns generally come in pairs, one masculine and one feminine; for example, אִישׁ /iʃ/ means man and אִשָּׁה /iˈʃa/ means woman. (When discussing mixed-sex groups, the plural of the masculine noun is used.)

=== Number: singular, plural, and dual ===
Hebrew nouns are inflected for grammatical number; as in English, count nouns have a singular form for referring to one object and a plural form for referring to more than one. Unlike in English, some count nouns also have separate dual forms, for referring to two objects; see below.

Masculine nouns generally form their plural by adding the suffix ־ים /-im/:

- מַחְשֵׁב /maħˈʃev/ (computer) → מַחְשְׁבִים /maħʃeˈvim/ (computers)

The addition of the extra syllable usually causes the vowel in the first syllable to shorten if it is Kamatz:

- דָּבָר /davar/ (thing) → דְּבָרִים /dvaˈrim/ (things)

Many common two-syllable masculine nouns accented on the penultimate syllable (often called segolates, because many (but not all) of them have the vowel /seˈɡol/ (/-e-/) in the last syllable), undergo more drastic characteristic vowel changes in the plural:

- יֶלֶד /ˈjeled/ (boy) → יְלָדִים /jelaˈdim/ (boys, children)
- בֹּקֶר /ˈboker/ (morning) → בְּקָרִים /bkaˈrim/ (mornings)
- חֶדֶר /ˈħeder/ (room) → חֲדָרִים /ħadaˈrim/ (rooms)

Feminine nouns ending in /-a/ or /-at/ generally drop this ending and add /-ot/, usually without any vowel changes:

- מִטָּה /miˈta/ (bed) → מִטּוֹת /miˈtot/ (beds)
- מִסְעָדָה /misʕaˈda/ (restaurant) → מִסְעָדוֹת /misʕaˈdot/ (restaurants)
- צַּלַּחַת /t͡saˈlaħat/ (plate) → צַלָּחוֹת /t͡salaˈħot/ (plates)

Nouns ending in /-e-et/ also replace this ending with /-ot/, with an /-e-/ in the preceding syllable usually changing to /-a-/:

- מַחְבֶּרֶת /maħˈberet/ (notebook) → מַחְבָּרוֹת /maħbaˈrot/ (notebooks)

Nouns ending in /-ut/ and /-it/ replace these endings with /-ujot/ and /-ijot/, respectively:

- חֲנוּת /ħaˈnut/ (store) → חֲנוּיוֹת /ħanuˈjot/ (stores)
- אֶשְׁכּוֹלִית /eʃkoˈlit/ (grapefruit) → אֶשְׁכּוֹלִיּוֹת /eʃkoliˈjot/ (grapefruits)

==== Plural exceptions ====
A large number of masculine nouns take the usually feminine ending /-ot/ in the plural:

- מָקוֹם /maˈkom/ (place) → מְקוֹמוֹת /mekoˈmot/ (places)
- חַלּוֹן /ħalon/ (window) → חַלּוֹנוֹת /ħaloˈnot/ (windows)

A small number of feminine nouns take the usually masculine ending /-im/:

- מִלָּה /mila/ (word) → מִלִּים /miˈlim/ (words)
- שָׁנָה /ʃana/ (year) → שָׁנִים /ʃaˈnim/ (years)

Many plurals are completely irregular:

- עִיר /ir/ (city) → עָרִים /ʕaˈrim/ (cities)
- עִפָּרוֹן /ʕiparon/ (pencil) → עֶפְרוֹנוֹת /ʕefroˈnot/ (pencils)
- אִישׁ /iʃ/ (man; root ʔ-I-) → אֲנָשִׁים /ʔanaˈʃim/ (men, people; root ʔ-N-ʃ)

Some forms, like אָחוֹת ← אֲחָיוֹת (sister) or חָמוֹת ← חֲמָיוֹת (mother-in-law) reflect the historical broken plurals of Proto-Semitic, which have been preserved in other Semitic languages (most notably Arabic).

When referring to quantities of eleven or more, the singular form may be used, and in some cases (such as the following) even preferred.

- חֲמִשִּׁים שָׁנָה /ħamiˈʃim ʃaˈna/ (fifty years) as opposed to חֲמִשִּׁים שָׁנִים /ħamiˈʃim ʃaˈnim/
- מָאתַיִם אִישׁ /maˈtajim iʃ/ (two hundred people) as opposed to מָאתַיִם אֲנָשִׁים /maˈtajim ʔanaˈʃim/

==== Dual ====
Hebrew also has a dual number, expressed in the ending /-ajim/, but even in ancient times its use was very restricted. In modern times, it is usually used in expressions of time and number, or items that are inherently dual. These nouns have plurals as well, which are used for numbers higher than two, for example:

Singular	Double	Triple
פַּעַם אַחַת /ˈpaʕam aˈħat/ (once)	פַּעֲמַיִם /paʕaˈmajim/ (twice)	שָׁלוֹשׁ פְּעָמִים /ʃaˈloʃ peʕaˈmim/ (thrice)
שָׁבוּעַ אֶחָד /ʃaˈvuaʕ eˈħad/ (one week)	שְׁבוּעַיִם /ʃvuˈʕajim/ (two weeks)	שְׁלוֹשָׁה שָׁבוּעוֹת /ʃloˈʃa ʃavuˈʕot/ (three weeks)
מֵאָה /ˈmeʔa/ (one hundred)	מָאתַיִם /maˈtajim/ (two hundred)	שְׁלוֹשׁ מֵאוֹת /ˈʃloʃ meˈʔot/ (three hundred)

The dual is also used for some body parts, for instance:

- רֶגֶל /ˈreɡel/ (foot) → רַגְלַיִם /raɡˈlajim/ (feet)
- אֹזֶן /ˈʔozen/ (ear) → אָזְנַיִם /ʔozˈnajim/ (ears)
- עַיִן /ˈʕajin/ (eye) → עֵינַיִם /ʕe(j)ˈnajim/ (eyes)
- יָד /jad/ (hand) → יָדַיִם /jaˈdajim/ (hands)

In this case, even if there are more than two, the dual is still used, for instance /leˈχelev jeʃ ˈʔarbaʕ raɡˈlajim/ ("a dog has four legs").

The dual is also used for certain objects that are "semantically" dual. For instance, משקפים /miʃkaˈfajim/ (eyeglasses) and מספרים /mispaˈrajim/ (scissors). As in the English "two pairs of pants", the plural of these words uses the word זוּג /zuɡ/ (pair), e.g. /ʃne zuˈɡot mispaˈrajim/ ("two pairs-of scissors-DUAL").

Similarly, the dual can be found in some place names, such as the city גִּבְעָתַיִם /givʕaˈtajim/ (Twin Peaks, referring to the two hills of the landscape on which the city is built) and the country מִצְרַיִם /mit͡sˈrajim/ (Egypt, perhaps related to the ancient conceptualization of Egypt as two realms: Upper Egypt and Lower Egypt). However, both the city names and country names are actually grammatically treated as feminine singular nouns, as the words עִיר /ʕir/ for city and מְדִינָה /mediˈna/ for country are both feminine.

=== Noun construct ===
In Hebrew, as in English, a noun can modify another noun. This is achieved by placing the modifier immediately after what it modifies, in a construction called סְמִיכוּת /smiˈχut/ (adjacency). The noun being modified appears in its construct form, or status constructus. For most nouns, the construct form is derived fairly easily from the normal (indefinite) form:

- The singular of a masculine noun typically does not change form.
- The plural of a masculine noun typically replaces the suffix ־ים /-im/ with the suffix ־י /-e/.
- The singular of a feminine noun ending in ־ה /-a/ typically replaces that ה with a ת /-at/.
- The plural of a feminine noun typically does not change form.

There are many words (usually ancient ones) that have changes in vocalization in the construct form. For example, the construct form of /ˈbajit/ (house, בַּיִת) is /bet/ (house-of, בֵּית). However, these two forms are written the same without niqqudot.

In addition, the definite article is never placed on the first noun (the one in the construct form).

- בֵּית סֵפֶר /bet ˈsefer/ (literally, house-of book or bookhouse, i.e. school)
- בֵּית הַסֵּפֶר /bet ha-ˈsefer/ (literally, house-of the-book, i.e. the school)
- בָּתֵּי חוֹלִים /baˈte ħoˈlim/ (literally, houses-of sick-people, i.e. hospitals)
- עוּגַת הַשּׁוֹקוֹלָד /ʕuɡat ha-ʃokolad/ (the chocolate cake)
- דֹּאַר אֲוִיר /ˈdoʔar ʔaˈvir/ (air mail)
- כֶּלֶב רְחוֹב /ˈkelev reˈħov/ (street dog)
- בַּקְבּוּק הֶחָלָב /bakˈbuk he-ħaˈlav/ (the bottle of milk)

However, this rule is not always adhered to in informal or colloquial speech; one finds, for example, הָעוֹרֵךְ דִּין /ha-ˈoʁeχ din/ (literally the law organiser, i.e. lawyer).

=== Possession ===
Possession is generally indicated using the preposition של /ʃel/, roughly meaning of or belonging to:

- הַסֵּפֶר שֶׁלִּי /ha-ˈsefer ʃeˈli/ (literally the-book of-me, i.e. my book)
- הַדִּירָה שֶׁלְּךָ /ha-diˈra ʃelˈχa/ (literally the-apartment of-you, i.e. your apartment, single masculine form)
- הַמִּשְׂחָק שֶׁל אֶנְדֶּר /ha-misˈħaq ʃel ˈender/ (literally the-game of-Ender, i.e. Ender's Game)

In literary style, nouns are inflected to show possession through noun declension; a personal suffix is added to the construct form of the noun (discussed above). So, סִפְרֵי /sifˈre/ (books of) can be inflected to form סְפָרַי /sfaˈraj/ (my books), סְפָרֶיךָ /sfaˈreχa/ (your books, singular masculine form), סְפָרֵינוּ /sfaˈrenu/ (our books), and so forth, while דִּירַת /diˈrat/ (apartment of) gives דִּירָתִי /diraˈti/ (my apartment), דִּירַתְךָ /diratˈχa/ (your apartment; singular masculine form), דִּירָתֵנוּ /diraˈtenu/ (our apartment), etc.

While the use of these forms is mostly restricted to formal and literary speech, they are in regular use in some colloquial phrases, such as מָה שְׁלוֹמְךָ? /ma ʃlomˈχa?/ (literally "what peace-of-you?", i.e. "what is your peace?", i.e. "how are you?", singular masculine form) or לְדַעֲתִי /ledaʕaˈti/ (in my opinion/according to my knowledge).

In addition, the inflected possessive is commonly used for terms of kinship; for instance, בְּנִי /bni/ (my son), בִּתָּם /biˈtam/ (their daughter), and אִשְׁתּוֹ /iʃˈto/ (his wife) are preferred to הַבֵּן שֶׁלִּי /ha-ˈben ʃe'li/, הַבַּת שֶׁלָּהֶם /ha-ˈbat ʃelahem/, and הָאִשָּׁה שֶׁלּוֹ /ha-ʔiˈʃa ʃe'lo/. However, usage differs for different registers and sociolects: In general, the colloquial will use more analytic constructs in place of noun declensions.

=== Noun derivation ===
In the same way that Hebrew verbs are conjugated by applying various prefixes, suffixes and internal vowel combinations, Hebrew nouns can be formed by applying various "meters" (Hebrew /miʃkaˈlim/) and suffixes to the same roots. Gerunds, as indicated above, are one example.

Many abstract nouns are derived from noun, using the suffix /-ut/:

- סֵפֶר /ˈsefer/ (book) → סִפְרוּת /sifˈrut/ (literature)

Also, there is הִתְקַטְּלוּת /hitkat'lut/ meter, that also ends with /-ut/:

- הִתְיַעֵץ /hitjaˈʕet͡s/ (to consult) → הִתְיַעֲצוּת /hitjaʕaˈt͡sut/ (consultation)
- הִתְרַגֵּשׁ /hitraˈɡeʃ/ (to get excited) → הִתְרַגְּשׁוּת /hitraɡˈʃut/ (excitement)

The קַטְלָן /katˈlan/ meter applied to a root, and the /-an/ suffix applied to a noun, indicate an agent or job:

- שֶׁקֶר /ˈʃeker/ (lie) (root: ש־ק־ר ʃ-q-r) → שַׁקְרָן /ʃak'ran/ (liar)
- פַּחַד /ˈpaħad/ (fear) (root: פ־ח־ד p-ħ-d) → פַּחְדָן /paħˈdan/ (coward)
- חָלָב /ħaˈlav/ (milk) → חַלְבָן /ħalˈvan/ (milkman)
- סֵדֶר /ˈseder/ (order) → סַדְרָן /sadˈran/ (usher)

The suffix /-on/ usually denotes a diminutive:

- מִטְבָּח /mitˈbaħ/ (kitchen) → מִטְבָּחוֹן /mitbaˈħon/ (kitchenette)
- סֵפֶר /ˈsefer/ (book) → סִפְרוֹן /sifˈron/ (booklet)
- מַחְשֵׁב /maħˈʃev/ (computer) → מַחְשְׁבוֹן /maħʃeˈvon/ (calculator)

Though occasionally this same suffix can denote an augmentative:

- חֲנָיָה /ħanaˈja/ (parking space) → חַנְיוֹן /ħanˈjon/ (parking lot)
- קֶרַח /ˈkeraħ/ (ice) → קַרְחוֹן /karˈħon/ (glacier)

Repeating the last two letters of a noun or adjective can also denote a diminutive:

- כֶּלֶב /ˈkelev/ (dog) → כְּלַבְלַב /klavˈlav/ (puppy)
- קָצָר /kaˈt͡sar/ (short) → קְצַרְצַר /kt͡sarˈt͡sar/ (very short)

The קָטֶּלֶת /kaˈtelet/ meter commonly used to name diseases:

- אָדֹם /ʔaˈdom/ (red) → אַדֶּמֶת /ʔaˈdemet/ (rubella)
- כֶּלֶב /ˈkelev/ (dog) → כַּלֶּבֶת /kaˈlevet/ (rabies)
- צָהֹב /t͡saˈhov/ (yellow) → צַהֶבֶת /t͡saˈhevet/ (jaundice, more colloquially hepatitis)

However, it can have various different meanings as well:

- נְיָר /neˈjar/ (paper) → נַיֶּרֶת /naˈjeret/ (paperwork)
- כֶּסֶף /ˈkesef/ (money) → כַּסֶּפֶת /kaˈsefet/ (a safe)

New nouns are also often formed by the combination of two existing stems:

- קוֹל /kol/ (sound) + נוֹעַ /ˈno.aʕ/ (motion) → קוֹלְנוֹע /kolˈno.aʕ/ (cinema)
- רֶמֶז /ˈremez/ (hint) + אוֹר /ʔor/ (light) → רַמְזוֹר /ramˈzor/ (traffic light)

רַמְזוֹר /ramˈzor/ uses more strictly recent compound conventions, as the א aleph (today usually silent but historically very specifically a glottal stop) is dropped entirely from spelling and pronunciation of the compound.

Some nouns use a combination of methods of derivation:

- תּוֹעֶלֶת /toˈʕelet/ (benefit) → תוֹעַלְתָּנוּת /toʕaltaˈnut/ (Utilitarianism) (suffix /-an/ followed by suffix /-ut/)
- קֹמֶץ /ˈkomet͡s/ (a pinch (as in the amount held between two fingers. i.e., a small amount)) → קַמְצָן /kamˈt͡san/ (miser, miserly) → קַמְצָנוּת /qamt͡sanˈut/ (miserliness) (suffix /-an/ followed by suffix /-ut/)

== Adjectives ==
In Hebrew, an adjective (שֵׁם תֹּאַר /ʃem toar/) agrees in gender, number, and definiteness with the noun it modifies. Attributive adjectives follow the nouns they modify.

- סֵפֶר קָטָן /ˈsefer kaˈtan/ (a small book)
- סְפָרִים קְטַנִּים /sfaˈrim ktaˈnim/ (small books)
- בֻּבָּה קְטַנָּה /buˈba ktaˈna/ (a small doll)
- בֻּבּוֹת קְטַנּוֹת /buˈbot ktaˈnot/ (small dolls)

Adjectives ending in -i have slightly different forms:

- אִישׁ מְקוֹמִי /ʔiʃ mekoˈmi/ (a local man)
- אִשָּׁה מְקוֹמִית /ʔiˈʃa mekoˈmit/ (a local woman)
- אֲנָשִׁים מְקוֹמִיִּים /ʔanaˈʃim mekomiˈjim/ (local people)
- נָשִׁים מְקוֹמִיּוֹת /naˈʃim mekomiˈjot/ (local women)

Masculine nouns that take the feminine plural ending /-ot/ still take masculine plural adjectives, e.g. מְקוֹמוֹת יָפִים /mekoˈmot jaˈfim/ (beautiful places). The reverse goes for feminine plural nouns ending in /-im/, e.g. מִלִּים אֲרֻכּוֹת /miˈlim ʔaruˈkot/ (long words).

Many adjectives, like segolate nouns, change their vowel structure in the feminine and plural.

=== Use of the definite article with adjectives ===
In Hebrew, an attributive adjective takes the definite article if it modifies a definite noun (either a proper noun, or a definite common noun):

- הַמְּכוֹנִית הַחֲדָשָׁה הָאֲדֻמָּה הַמְּהִירָה /ha-mχonit ha-ħadaʃa ha-ʔaduma ha-mhira/ (The new, red, fast car, lit. The car the new the red the fast (f.sing.))
- דָּוִד הַגָּדוֹל /daˈvid ha-ɡaˈdol/ (David the Great, lit. David the-great (m.sing.))

=== Adjectives derived from verbs ===
Many adjectives in Hebrew are derived from the present tense of verbs. These adjectives are inflected the same way as the verbs they are derived from:

- סוֹעֵר /soˈʕer/ (stormy, paʕal) → סוֹעֶרֶת /soˈʕeret/, סוֹעֲרִים /soʕaˈrim/, סוֹעֲרוֹת /soʕaˈrot/
- מְנֻתָּק /menuˈtak/ (alienated, puʕal) → מְנֻתֶּקֶת /menuˈteket/, מְנֻתָּקִים /menutaˈkim/, מְנֻתָּקוֹת /menutaˈkot/
- מַרְשִׁים /marˈʃim/ (impressive, hifʕil) → מַרְשִׁימָה /marʃiˈma/, מַרְשִׁימִים /marʃiˈmim/, מַרְשִׁימוֹת /marʃiˈmot/

== Adverbs ==
The Hebrew term for adverb is תֹּאַר הַפֹּעַל /ˈtoʔar ha-ˈpoʕal/.

Hebrew forms adverbs in several different ways.

Some adjectives have corresponding one-word adverbs. In many cases, the adverb is simply the adjective's masculine singular form:

- חָזָק /ħaˈzak/ (strong or strongly)
- בָּרוּר /baˈrur/ (clear or clearly)

In other cases, the adverb has a distinct form:

- מַהֵר /maˈher/ (quickly; from the adjective מָהִיר /maˈhir/, quick)
- לְאַט /leʔat/ (slowly; from the adjective אִטִּי /iˈti/, slow)
- הֵיטֵב /heˈtev/ (well; from the adjective טוֹב /tov/, good)

In some cases, an adverb is derived from an adjective using its singular feminine form or (mostly in poetic or archaic usage) its plural feminine form:

- אוֹטוֹמָטִית /otoˈmatit/ (automatically)
- קַלּוֹת /kaˈlot/ (lightly)

Most adjectives, however, do not have corresponding one-word adverbs; rather, they have corresponding adverb phrases, formed using one of the following approaches:

- using the prepositional prefix ב /be-/ (in) with the adjective's corresponding abstract noun:
  - בִּזְהִירוּת /bi-zhiˈrut/ ("in carefulness": carefully)
  - בַּעֲדִינוּת /ba-ʕadiˈnut/ ("in fineness": finely)
- using the same prefix, but with the noun אֹפֶן /ˈʔofen/ (means/fashion), and modifying the noun with the adjective's masculine singular form:
  - בְּאֹפֶן אִטִּי /beˈʔofen ʔiˈti/ ("in slow fashion": slowly).
- similarly, but with the noun צוּרָה /t͡suˈra/ (like/shape), and using the adjective's feminine singular form:
  - בְּצוּרָה אָפְיָנִית /be-t͡suˈra ʔofjaˈnit/ ("in characteristic form": characteristically).

The use of one of these methods does not necessarily preclude the use of the others; for example, slowly may be either לְאַט /leˈʔat/ (a one-word adverb), בְּאִטִּיּוּת /be-ʔitiˈjut/ (literally "in slowness", a somewhat more elegant way of expressing the same thing) or בְּאֹפֶן אִטִּי /beˈʔofen ʔiˈti/ ("in slow fashion"), as mentioned above.

Finally, as in English, there are various adverbs that do not have corresponding adjectives at all:

- לָכֵן /laˈχen/ (therefore)
- כָּכָה /ˈkaχa/ (thus)

== Prepositions ==
Like English, Hebrew is primarily a prepositional language, with a large number of prepositions. Several of Hebrew's most common prepositions are prefixes rather than separate words. For example, English in a room is Hebrew בְּחֶדֶר /bə-ˈħeder/. These prefixes precede the definite prefix ה, which assimilates to them: the room is הַחֶדֶר /ha-ˈħeder/; in the room is בַּחֶדֶר /ba-ˈħeder/.

=== Direct objects ===
The preposition אֶת /ʔet/ plays an important role in Hebrew grammar. Its most common use is to introduce a direct object; for example, English I see the book is in Hebrew אֲנִי רוֹאֶה אֶת הַסֵּפֶר /ʔaˈni roˈʔe ʔet ha-ˈsefer/ (literally I see /ʔet/ the-book). However, אֶת /ʔet/ is used only with semantically definite direct objects, such as nouns with the, proper nouns, and personal pronouns; with semantically indefinite direct objects, it is simply omitted: אֲנִי רוֹאֶה סֵפֶר ʔani roʔe sefer (I see a book) does not use את /ʔet/. This has no direct translation into English, and is best described as an object particle — that is, it denotes that the word it precedes is the direct object of the verb.

This preposition has a number of special uses. For example, when the adjective צָרִיךְ /t͡saˈriχ/ (in need (of)) takes a definite noun complement, it uses the preposition אֶת /ʔet/: הָיִיתִי צָרִיךְ אֶת זֶה /haˈjiti t͡saˈriχ ʔet ze/ (literally I-was in-need-of /ʔet/ this, i.e. I needed this). Here as elsewhere, the אֶת /ʔet/ is dropped with an indefinite complement: הָיוּ צְרִיכִים יוֹתֵר /haˈju t͡sriˈχim joˈter/ (literally they-were in-need-of more, i.e. they needed more). This is perhaps related to the verb-like fashion in which the adjective is used.

In Biblical Hebrew, there is possibly another use of /ʔet/. Waltke and O'Connor (pp. 177–178) make the point: "...(1) ...sign of the accusative... (2) More recent grammarians regard it as a marker of emphasis used most often with definite nouns in the accusative role. The apparent occurrences with the nominative are most problematic... AM Wilson late in the nineteenth century concluded from his exhaustive study of all the occurrences of the debated particle that it had an intensive or reflexive force in some of its occurrences. Many grammarians have followed his lead. (reference lists studies of 1955, 1964, 1964, 1973, 1965, 1909, 1976.) On such a view, /ʔet/ is a weakened emphatic particle corresponding to the English pronoun 'self'... It resembles Greek 'autos' and Latin 'ipse' both sometimes used for emphasis, and like them it can be omitted from the text, without obscuring the grammar. This explanation of the particle's meaning harmonizes well with the facts that the particle is used in Mishnaic Hebrew as a demonstrative and is found almost exclusively with determinate nouns."

==== Pronominal suffix ====
There is a form called the verbal pronominal suffix, in which a direct object can be rendered as an additional suffix onto the verb. This form allows for a high degree of word economy, as the single fully conjugated verb expresses the verb, its voice, its subject, its object, and its tense.

- שְׁמַרְנוּהוּ /ʃmarˈnuhu/ (we protected him)

In modern usage, the verbal pronominal suffixes are rarely used, in favor of expression of direct objects as the inflected form of the separate word ʔet. It is used more commonly in biblical and poetic Hebrew (for instance, in prayers).

=== Indirect objects ===
Indirect objects are objects requiring a preposition other than אֶת /ʔet/. The preposition used depends on the verb, and these can be very different from the one used in English. In the case of definite indirect objects, the preposition will replace את /ʔet/.

- שָׁכַחְתִּי מֵהַבְּחִירוֹת /ʃaˈχaħti me-ha-bħiˈrot/ (I forgot about the election)

Hebrew grammar distinguishes between various kinds of indirect objects, according to what they specify. Thus, there is a division between objects for time תֵּאוּר זְמַן (/teˈʔur zman/), objects for place תֵּאוּר מָקוֹם (/teʔur maˈkom/), objects for reason תֵּאוּר סִבָּה (/teˈʔur siˈba/) and many others.

In Hebrew, there are no distinct prepositional pronouns. If the object of a preposition is a pronoun, the preposition contracts with the object yielding an inflected preposition.

- דִּבַּרְנוּ עִם דָּוִד /diˈbarnu ʕim 'david/ (we spoke with David)
- דִּבַּרְנוּ אִתּוֹ /diˈbarnu iˈto/ (we spoke with him)

(The preposition עִם /ʕim/ (with) in everyday speech is not inflected, rather a different, more archaic pronoun אֶת /ʔet/ with the same meaning, unrelated to the direct object marker, is used instead.)

=== Inflected prepositions ===
Hebrew prepositional pronouns
Form	1st person		2nd person				3rd person			
Form	Singular	Plural	Singular		Plural		Singular		Plural	
Form	Singular	Plural	Masculine	Feminine	Masculine	Feminine	Masculine	Feminine	Masculine	Feminine
Singular	־י/ -ִי	ּ־נו/ -ֵנו	־ך/ ־ךָ	־ך/ -ֵך	־כם/ ־כֶם	־כן/ ־כֶן	־ו/ ־וֹ	־ה/ -ָהּ	־ם/ -ָם	־ן/ -ָן
Singular	-i	-(e)nu	-kha	-(e)kh	-khem	-khen	-o	-ah	-am	-an
Plural	־יי/ -ַי	־ינו/ -ֶינוּ	־יך/ -ֶיךָ	־יך/ -ַיִך	־יכם/ -ֵיכֶם	־יכן/-ֵיכֶן	־יו/ -ָיו	־יה/ -ֶיהָ	־יהם/ -ֵיהֶם	־יהן/ -ֵיהֶן
Plural	-ay	-eynu	-eykha	-ayikh	-eykhem	-eykhen	-av	-eyha	-eyhem	-eyhen

Hebrew inflected prepositions
Base form		Inflection stem		Meaning	Notes
Hebrew	Latin	Hebrew	Latin	Meaning	Notes
אוֹדוֹת	odot	אוֹדוֹתֵי־	odotey-	about, with regard to	
אַחַר	achar	אַחֲרֵי־	acharey-	after	
אֵצֶל	etzel	אֶצְל־	etzl-	at, near; with (owned by)	
אֶת	et	אוֹת־	ot-	definite direct object marker	
בְּ־	be-	(irregular)	(irregular)	in; by	Irregular inflection
בְּאֶמְצָעוּת	beemtza'ut	בְּאֶמְצָעוּת־	beemtza'ut	using, by means of	
בִּגְלַל	biglal	בִּגְלָל־	biglal-	due to, because of	
בִּזְכוּת	bizchut	בִּזְכוּת־	bizchut-	thanks to, in favor of	
בֵּין	beyn	(irregular)	(irregular)	between, amongst	Irregular inflection
בְּלִי	bli	בִּלְעֲדֵי־	bil'adey-	without	
בְּמַהֲלַך	bemahalakh	בְּמַהֲלָכ־	bemahalakh	during, over the course of	
בְּמַעֲמַד	bema'amad	בְּמַעֲמָד־	bema'ad-	in the presence of	
בִּמְקוֹם	bimkom	בִּמְקוֹמ־	bimkom-	instead of	
בְּעִקְבֵי	be'ikvey	(irregular)	(irregular)	following, as a result of	Irregular inflection
בְּעֶצֶם	beetzem	בְעַצְמ־	be'atzm-	by (oneself)	
בּפְנֵי	bifney	בִּפְנֵי־	bifney-	facing; in the face of	
בְּקֵרֶב	bekerev	בְּקִרְבּ־	bekirb-	among, amidst; internally	
בִּשְׁבִיל	bishvil	בִּשְׁבִיל־	bishvil-	for, for the sake of	
בְּשֶׁם	beshem	(irregular)	(irregular)	on behalf of, in the name of	
בְּתוֹך	betokh	בְּתוֹכ־	betokh-	inside, in	
זוּלַת	zulat	זוּלָת־	zulat-	beside, apart from	
כְּלַפֵּי	klapey	כְּלַפֵּי־	klapey-	in relation to, towards	
כְּמוֹ	kmo	(irregular)	(irregular)	like, as	Irregular inflection
כְּנֶגֶד	keneged	כְּנֶגְדּ־	kenegd-	against, as opposed to; in exchange for	
לְ־	le	(irregular)	(irregular)	to, for; toward, to	Two irregular inflections depending on meaning
לאוֹרֶך	leorekh	לְאוֹרְכּ־	leork-	along, throughout	
לְגַּבֵּי	legabey	לְגַּבֵּי־	legabey-	concerning, regarding	
לְדִבְרֵי	ledivrey	לְדִבְרֵי־	ledivrey-	according to	
לְיַד	leyad	לְיָד־	leyad-	near, next to	
לִידֵי	lidey	(irregular)	(irregular)	in (one's) hands; over to	
לִכְבוֹד	likhvod	לִכְבוֹד־	likhvod-	in honor of	
לְעֻמַּת	le'umat	לְעֻמָּת־	le'umat-	compared with	
לְפִי	lefi	לְפִי־	lefi-	according to	
לִפְנֵי	lifney	לִפְנֵי־	lifney-	before, in front of	
לִקְרַאת	likra`t	לִקְרָאת־	likra`t-	in preparation to, for	
לְרוֹחַב	lerochav	לְרוֹחְבּ־	lerochb-	across, across from	
לְתוֹך	letokh	לְתוֹכ־	letokh-	into	
מִ־	mi	(irregular)	(irregular)	from, of, than	
מֵאֵת	meet	מֵאִתּ־	meit-	from (authored by)	
מול/ מוּל	mul	מוּל־	mul-	against, opposite, in front of	
מֵעַל	me'al	מֵעֲלֵי־	me'aley-	above, over, on top of	
מִפְּנֵי	mipney	מִפְּנֵי־	mipney-	from, away from	
מִתּוֹך	mitokh	מִתּוֹכ־	mitokh-	out of, from	
מִתַּחַת	mitachat	מִתַּחְתֵּי־	mitachtey-	under, below, on bottom of	
נֶגֶד	neged	נֶגְדּ־	negd-	against, opposed to	
עֲבוּר	'avur	עֲבוּר־	'avur-	for	
עַל	'al	עֲלֵי־	'aley-	on, upon, over; about	
עַל גַּב	'al gav	עַל גַּבּ־	'al gab-	on, upon	
עַל גַּבֵּי	'al gabey	עַל גַּבֵּי־	'al gabey-	on, upon	
עַל יַד	'al yad	עַל יָד־	'al yad-	near, next to	
עַל יְדֵי	'al yedey	עַל יְדֵי־	'al yedey-	by, by means of, via	
עַל פִּי	'al pi	עַל פִּי־	'al pi-	according to, in accordance with	
עַל פְּנֵי	'al pney	עַל פְּנֵי־	'al pney-	over, on top of, above	
עִם	'im	אִתּ־	it-	with	
עֶצֶם	'etzem	עַצְמ־	'atzm-	reflexive pronoun marker	
קֹדֶם	kodem	קוֹדְמ־	kodm-	before	
שֶׁל	shel	(irregular)	(irregular)	of, belonging to	Irregular inflection
תּוֹך	tokh	תוֹכ־	tokh-	in	
תַּחַת	tachat	תַּחְתֵּי־	tachtey-	under, below, beneath	

Hebrew irregular inflected prepositions
Preposition	1st person		2nd person				3rd person			
Preposition	Singular	Plural	Singular		Plural		Singular		Plural	
Preposition	Singular	Plural	m.	f.	m.	f.	m.	f.	m.	f.
בְּ־ be "in; by"	בִּי	בָּנוּ	בְּךָ	בָּך	בָּכֶם	בָּכֶן	בּוֹ	בָּהּ	בָּהֶם	בָּהֶן
בְּ־ be "in; by"	bi	banu	bekha	bakh	bakhem	bakhen	bo	bah	bahem	bahen
בֵּין beyn "between"	בֵּינִי	בֵּינֵינוּ	בֵּינְךָ	בֵּינֵך	בֵּינֵיכֶם	בֵּינֵיכֶן	בֵּינוֹ	בֵּינָהּ	בֵּינֵיהֶם	בֵּינֵיהֶן
בֵּין beyn "between"	beyni	beyneynu	beynkha	beynekh	beyneykhem	beyneykhen	beyno	beynah	beyneyhem	beyneyhen
בְּעִקְבֵי be'ikvey "following, in turn"	בַּעֲקֵבַי	בַּעֲקֵבֵינוּ	בַּעֲקֵבֵיךָ	בַּעֲקֵבַיִך	בְּעִקְבֵיכֶם	בְּעִקְבֵיכֶן	בַּעֲקֵבָיו	בַּעֲקֵבֶיהָ	בְּעִקְבֵיהֶם	בְּעִקְבֵיהֶן
בְּעִקְבֵי be'ikvey "following, in turn"	ba'akevay	ba'akeveynu	ba'akeveykha	ba'akevayikh	bikveykhem	bikveykhen	ba'akevav	ba'akeveyha	bikveyhem	bikveyhen
בְּשֶׁם beshem "on (x)'s behalf"	בִּשְׁמִי	בִּשְׁמֵנוּ	בְּשִׁמְךָ	בִּשְׁמֵך	בְּשִׁמְכֶם	בְּשִׁמְכֶן	בִּשְׁמוֹ	בִּשְׁמָהּ	בִּשְׁמָם	בִּשְׁמָן
בְּשֶׁם beshem "on (x)'s behalf"	bishmi	bishmenu	beshimkha	bishmekh	beshimkhem	beshimkhen	bishmo	bishmah	bishmam	bishman
כְּמוֹ kmo "like, as"	כָּמֹנִי	כָּמֹנוּ	כָּמֹךָ	כָּמֹך	כָּמֹכֶם	כָּמֹכֶן	כָּמֹהוּ	כָּמֹהָ	כָּמֹהֶם	כָּמֹהֶן
כְּמוֹ kmo "like, as"	kamoni	kamonu	kamokha	kamokh	kamokhem	kamokhen	kamohu	kamoha	kamohem	kamohen
לְ־ le "to, for"	לִי	לָנוּ	לְךָ	לָך	לָכֶם	לָכֶן	לוֹ	לָהּ	לָהֶם	לָהֶן
לְ־ le "to, for"	li	lanu	lekha	lakh	lakhem	lakhen	lo	lah	lahem	lahen
לְ־ le "to, toward"	אֵלַי	אֵלֶינוּ	אֵלֶיךָ	אֵלַיִך	אֵלֶיכֶם	אֵלֶיכֶן	אֵלָיו	אֵלֶיהָ	אֵלֶיהֶם	אֵלֶיהֶן
לְ־ le "to, toward"	elay	eleynu	eleykha	elayikh	eleykhem	eleykhen	elav	eleyha	eleyhem	eleyhen
לִידֵי lidey "in the hands of"	לְיָדַי	לְיָדֵינוּ	לְיָדֶיךָ	לְיָדַיִך	לִידֵיכֶם	לִידֵיכֶן	לְיָדָיו	לְיָדֶיהָ	לִידֵיהֶם	לִידֵיהֶן
לִידֵי lidey "in the hands of"	leyaday	leyadeynu	leyadeykha	leyadayikh	lideykhem	lideykhen	leyadav	leyadeyha	lideyhem	lideyhen
מִ־ mi- "from, than"	מִמֶּנִי	מֵאּתַּנוּ	מִמֶּךָ	מִמֶּך	מִכֶּם	מִכֶּן	מִמֶּנוֹ	מִמֶּנָהּ	מִהֶם	מִהֶן
מִ־ mi- "from, than"	mimeni	meitanu	mimekha	mimekh	mikem	miken	mimeno	mimenah	mihem	mihen
שֶׁל shel "of"	שֶׁלִּי	שֶׁלָּנוּ	שֶׁלְּךָ	שֶׁלָּך	שֶׁלָּכֶם	שֶׁלָּכֶן	שֶׁלּוֹ	שֶׁלָּהּ	שֶׁלָּהֶם	שֶׁלָּהֶן
שֶׁל shel "of"	sheli	shelanu	shelkha	shelakh	shelakhem	shelakhen	shelo	shelah	shelahem	shelahen

== See also ==
- Hebrew verb conjugation
- Prefixes in Hebrew
- Suffixes in Hebrew
- Hebrew spelling

== Bibliography ==
Modern Hebrew

- Laufer, Asher (1999), "Hebrew", Handbook of the International Phonetic Association: 96–99
- Bolozky, Shmuel (1996), 501 Hebrew Verbs, Barron's Educational Series, Inc., ISBN 0812094689
- Glinert, Lewis (2005), Modern Hebrew: An Essential Grammar (3rd ed.), Routledge UK, ISBN 0415700825
- Zuckermann, Ghil'ad (2020), Revivalistics: From the Genesis of Israeli to Language Reclamation in Australia and Beyond, Oxford University Press, ISBN 9780199812790

Biblical Hebrew

- Waltke, Bruce K.; M. O'Connor (1990), An introduction to Biblical Hebrew Syntax, Winona Lake, Indiana: Eisenbrauns, pp. 177–178, ISBN 0931464315
- Duane A. Garrett and Jason S. DeRouchie, A Modern Grammar for Biblical Hebrew
