= Apophony =

Sound change within a word that indicates grammatical information

In linguistics, apophony is an alternation of vowel (quality) within a word that indicates grammatical information (often inflectional). It is also known as ablaut, (vowel) gradation, (vowel) mutation, alternation, internal modification, stem modification, stem alternation, replacive morphology, stem mutation, or internal inflection.

== Description ==
Apophony is exemplified in English as the internal vowel alternations that produce such related words as

- sing, sang, sung, song
- bind, bound
- blood, bleed, bled
- brood, breed, bred
- food, fodder, feed, fed
- lie, lay
- rise, rose, risen, rouse
- weave, weft, wove
- foot, feet
- goose, gosling, geese
- tooth, teeth

The difference in these vowels marks variously a difference in tense or aspect (e.g. sing/sang/sung), transitivity (rise/raise), part of speech (sing/song), or grammatical number (goose/geese).

That these sound alternations function grammatically can be seen as they are often equivalent to grammatical suffixes (an external modification). Compare the following:

Present tense	Past tense
jump	jumped
sing	sang
Singular	Plural
book	books
goose	geese

The vowel alternation between i and a indicates a difference between present and past tense in the pair sing/sang. Here the past tense is indicated by the vowel a just as the past tense is indicated on the verb jump with the past tense suffix -ed. Likewise, the plural suffix -s on the word books has the same grammatical function as the presence of the vowel ee in the word geese (where ee alternates with oo in the pair goose/geese).

Consonants, too, can alternate in ways that are used grammatically. An example is the pattern in English of verb-noun pairs with related meanings but differing in voicing of a postvocalic consonant:

Verb voiced	Noun unvoiced
advise	advice
believe	belief
breathe (phonetically: /briːð/)	breath (phonetically: /brɛθ/)
give	gift
house (phonetically: /haʊz/)	house (phonetically: /haʊs/)
live	life
rive	rift
use (phonetically: /juːz/)	use (phonetically: /juːs/)
weave	weft
wreathe (phonetically: /riːð/)	wreath (phonetically: /riːθ/)

Most instances of apophony develop historically from changes due to phonological assimilation that are later grammaticalized (or morphologized) when the environment causing the assimilation is lost. Such is the case with English goose/geese and breath/breathe.

== Types ==
Apophony may involve various types of alternations, including vowel quality, consonants, prosodic elements (such as tone and syllable length), or nasality (on vowels).

The sound alternations may be used inflectionally or derivationally. The particular function of a given alternation will depend on the language.

=== Vowel gradation ===
Apophony often involves vowels. Indo-European ablaut (English sing-sang) and Germanic umlaut (goose-geese), mentioned above, are well attested examples. Another example is from Dinka:

Singular	Plural	Gloss	Vowel alternation
dom	dum	'field/fields'	(o-u)
kat	kɛt	'frame/frames'	(a-ɛ)

The vowel alternation may involve more than just a change in vowel quality. In Athabaskan languages, such as Navajo, verbs have series of stems where the vowel alternates (sometimes with an added suffix) indicating a different tense-aspect. Navajo vowel ablaut, depending on the verb, may be a change in vowel, vowel length, nasality, and/or tone. For example, the verb stem kaah/-ką́ 'to handle an open container' has a total of 16 combinations of the 5 modes and 4 aspects, resulting in 7 different verb stem forms (i.e. -kaah, -kááh, -kaał, -kááł, -ka’, -ká, -ką́).

	Imperfective	Perfective	Progressive- future	Usitative- iterative	Optative
Momentaneous	kaah	ką́	kááł	kááh	kááł
Continuative	ká	ką́	kaał	kaah	kaał
Distributive	ka’	ką́	kaał	kaah	ka’
Conative	kááh	-	-	-	-

Another verb stem -géésh/-gizh 'to cut' has a different set of alternations and mode-aspect combinations, resulting in 3 different forms (i.e. -géésh, -gizh, -gish):

	Imperfective	Perfective	Progressive- future	Usitative- iterative	Optative
Momentaneous	géésh	gizh	gish	gish	géésh
Continuative	gizh	gizh	gish	gish	gizh
Semelfactive	gish	gish	gish	gish	gish/géésh

=== Prosodic apophony ===
Various prosodic elements, such as tone, syllable length, and stress, may be found in alternations. For example, Vietnamese has the following tone alternations which are used derivationally:

		tone alternation
đây 'here'	đấy 'there'	(ngang tone–sắc tone)
bây giờ 'now'	bấy giờ 'then'	(ngang tone–sắc tone)
kia 'there'	kìa 'yonder'	(ngang tone–huyền tone)
cứng 'hard'	cửng '(to) have an erection'	(sắc tone–hỏi tone)

Albanian uses different vowel lengths to indicate number and grammatical gender on nouns:

[ɡuːr] "stone"	[ɡur] "stones"
[dy] "two (masculine)"	[dyː] "two (feminine)"

English has alternating stress patterns that indicate whether related words are nouns (first syllable stressed) or verbs (second syllable stressed). This tends to be the case with words in English that came from Latin:

noun	verb
cóntrast	contrást
cónvict	convíct
ínsult	insúlt
óbject	objéct
pérmit	permít
pérvert	pervért
récord	recórd
súbject	subjéct

Prosodic alternations are sometimes analyzed not as a type of apophony but rather as prosodic affixes, which are known, variously, as suprafixes, superfixes, or simulfixes.

=== Consonant apophony ===
Consonant alternation is commonly known as consonant mutation or consonant gradation. Bemba indicates causative verbs through alternation of the stem-final consonant. Here the alternation involves spirantization and palatalization:

Intransitive verb	Causative verb
luba 'to be lost'	lufya 'to cause to be lost'
koma 'to be deaf'	komya 'to cause to be deaf'
pona 'to fall'	ponya 'to cause to fall'
enda 'to walk'	endesha 'to cause to walk'
lunga 'to hunt'	lunsha 'to cause to hunt'
kula 'to grow'	kusha 'to cause to grow'

Celtic languages are well known for their initial consonant mutations.

== Indo-European linguistics ==
=== Indo-European ablaut ===
In Indo-European linguistics, ablaut is the vowel alternation that produces such related words as sing, sang, sung, and song. The difference in the vowels results from the alternation (in the Proto-Indo-European language) of the vowel e with the vowel o or with no vowel.

To cite a few other examples of Indo-European ablaut, English has a certain class of verbs, called strong verbs, in which the vowel changes to indicate a different grammatical tense-aspect.

Imperative	Preterite	Past participle	Vowel alternation
swim	swam	swum	(i-a-u) phonetically: /ɪ-æ-ʌ/
fall	fell	fallen	(a-e-a) phonetically: /ɔː-ɛ-ɔː/
drive	drove	driven	(i-o-i) phonetically: /aɪ-oʊ-ɪ/

As the examples above show, a change in the vowel of the verb stem creates a different verb form. Some of the verbs also have a suffix in the past participle form.

=== Umlaut ===
In Indo-European linguistics, umlaut is the vowel fronting that produces such related words as foot > feet or strong > strength. The difference in the vowels results from the influence of an /i/, /iː/ or /j/ (which in most cases has since been lost) at the end of the word causing the stem vowel to be pulled forward. Some weak verbs show umlaut in the present tense, with the past tense representing the original vowel: bought > buy (/ɔː/>/aɪ/). Hundreds of similar examples can be found in English, German, Dutch and other languages.

Germanic a-mutation is a process analogous to umlaut, but involving the influence of a low vowel such as /ɑ/ causing a high vowel in the stem to lower.

=== Ablaut versus umlaut ===
In Indo-European historical linguistics the terms ablaut and umlaut refer to different phenomena and are not interchangeable. Ablaut is a process that dates back to Proto-Indo-European times, occurs in all Indo-European languages, and refers to (phonologically) unpredictable vowel alternations of a specific nature. From an Indo-European perspective, it typically appears as a variation between o, e, and no vowel, although various sound changes result in different vowel alternations appearing in different daughter languages. Umlaut, meanwhile, is a process that is particular to the Germanic languages and refers to a variation between back vowels and front vowels that was originally phonologically predictable, and was caused by the presence of an /i/ or /j/ in the syllable following the modified vowel.

From a diachronic (historical) perspective, the distinction between ablaut and umlaut is very important, particularly in the Germanic languages, as it indicates where and how a specific vowel alternation originates. It is also important when taking a synchronic (descriptive) perspective on old Germanic languages such as Old English, as umlaut was still a very regular and productive process at the time. When taking a synchronic perspective on modern languages, however, both processes appear very similar. For example, the alternations seen in sing/sang/sung and foot/feet both appear to be morphologically conditioned (e.g. the alternation appears in the plural or past tense, but not the singular or present tense) and phonologically unpredictable.

By analogy, descriptive linguists discussing synchronic grammars sometimes employ the terms ablaut and umlaut, using ablaut to refer to morphological vowel alternation generally (which is unpredictable phonologically) and umlaut to refer to any type of regressive vowel harmony (which is phonologically predictable). Ambiguity can be avoided by using alternative terms (apophony, gradation, alternation, internal modification for ablaut; vowel harmony for umlaut) for the broader sense of the words.

== Stem alternations and other morphological processes ==
Stem modifications (i.e. apophony) may co-occur with other morphological processes, such as affixation. An example of this is in the formation of plural nouns in German:

Singular	Plural
Buch 'book'	Bücher 'books'
Haus 'house'	Häuser 'houses'

Here the singular/plural distinction is indicated through umlaut and additionally by a suffix -er in the plural form. English also displays similar forms with a -ren suffix in the plural and a -en suffix in the past participle forms along with the internal vowel alternation:

child (singular) /tʃaɪld/	children (plural) /ˈtʃɪldrən/
drive (imperative) /draɪv/	driven (past participle) /ˈdrɪvən/

Chechen features this as well:

Singular	Plural
лам lam 'mountain'	лаьмнаш lämnaš 'mountains'
мотт mott 'language'	меттанаш mettanaš 'languages'

A more complicated example comes from Chickasaw where the positive/negative distinction in verbs displays vowel ablaut along with prefixation (ak-) and infixation (-'-):

Positive	Negative
hilhali 'I'm dancing'	akhi'lho 'I'm not dancing'

== Transfixation ==
The nonconcatenative morphology of the Afroasiatic languages is sometimes described in terms of apophony. The alternation patterns in many of these languages is quite extensive involving vowels and consonant gemination (i.e. doubled consonants). The alternations below are of Modern Standard Arabic, based on the root k–t–b 'write' (the symbol ⟨ː⟩ indicates gemination on the preceding consonant):

Word	Gloss	Alternation pattern
kataba	'he wrote'	(a - a - a)
kutiba	'it was written'	(u - i - a)
yaktubu	'he writes'	(ya - ∅ - u - u)
yuktabu	'it is written'	(yu - ∅ - a - u)
kaatib	'writing (active participle); writer'	(aa - i)
kuttaab	'writers'	(u - ːaa)
maktuub	'written'	(ma - ∅ - uu)
kitaabah	'(act of) writing'	(i - aa - ah)
kitaab	'book'	(i - aa)
kutub	'books'	(u - u)
kaataba	'he corresponded with'	(aa - a - a)
kattaba	'he caused to write'	(a - ːa - a)
kuttiba	'he was caused to write'	(u - ːi - a)

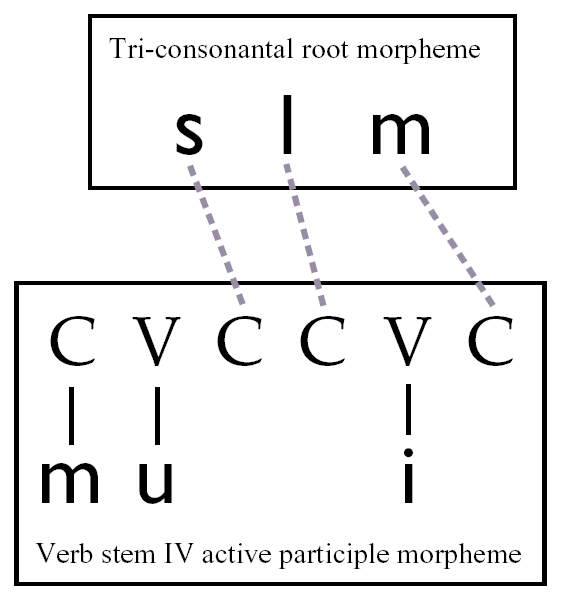
A diagram of an autosegmental representation of the Arabic word Muslim within linguistic theory. This differs from an analysis based on apophony.

Other analyses of these languages consider the patterns not to be sound alternations, but rather discontinuous roots with discontinuous affixes, known as transfixes (sometimes considered simulfixes or suprafixes). Some theoretical perspectives call up the notion of morphological templates or morpheme "skeletons".

It would also be possible to analyze English in this way as well, where the alternation of goose/geese could be explained as a basic discontinuous root g-se that is filled out with an infix -oo- "(singular)" or -ee- "(plural)". Many would consider this type of analysis for English to be less desirable as this type of infixal morphology is not very prevalent throughout English and the morphemes -oo- and -ee- would be exceedingly rare.

== Replacive morphemes ==
Another analytical perspective on sound alternations treats the phenomena not as merely alternation but rather a "replacive" morpheme that replaces part of a word. In this analysis, the alternation between goose/geese may be thought of as goose being the basic form where -ee- is a replacive morpheme that is substituted for oo.

goose → g-ee-se

This usage of the term morpheme (which is actually describing a replacement process, and not a true morpheme), however, is more in keeping with Item-and-Process models of morphology instead of Item-and-Arrangement models.

== Ablaut-motivated compounding ==
Ablaut reduplication, or ablaut-motivated compounding, is a type of word formation of "expressives" (such as onomatopoeia or ideophones), in which words are formed by reduplication of a base and alternation of the internal vowel.

The pattern of vowel alternation in English follows a front to back vowel order, which among clipped vowels means a subset of /ɪ/ > /ɛ/ > /æ/ > /ʌ/ > /ɒ/ > /ʊ/, as in:

- bing-bang-boom
- bish-bash-bosh
- criss-cross
- shilly-shally
- snip-snap
- splish-splash
- tic-tac-toe
- tick-tock
- ticky-tacky
- wishy-washy
- zig-zag

And partially in eeny, meeny, miny, moe.

In many Turkic languages the vowel pattern is low to high, as in Turkish çak-çuk (which follows the English pattern) and fan-fin (which contravenes it).

Examples from Japanese include:

- gata-goto 'rattle'
- kasa-koso 'rustle'

Examples from Chinese include:

- 叽里咕噜 (jīligūlū, 'babbling')
- 噼里啪啦 (pīlipālā, 'splashing')

Some languages do not appear to have a preferred order, for example Mongolian with both pay-puy and puy-pay.

== See also ==
- Alternation (linguistics)
- Consonant mutation
- Metaphony
- Morphology (linguistics)
- Nonconcatenative morphology
- References for ablaut

== Bibliography ==
- Anderson, Stephen R. (1985). Inflectional morphology. In T. Shopen (Ed.), Language typology and syntactic description: Grammatical categories and the lexicon (Vol. 3, pp. 150–201). Cambridge: Cambridge University Press. (Especially section 1.3 "Stem modifications").
- Asher, R. E. (Ed.). (1994). The Encyclopedia of language and linguistics. Oxford: Pergamon Press. ISBN 0-08-035943-4.
- Bauer, Laurie. (2004). A glossary of morphology. Washington, D.C.: Georgetown University Press.
- Hamano, Shoko. (1998). The Sound-Symbolic System of Japanese. CSLI Publications, Stanford.
- Haspelmath, Martin. (2002). Understanding morphology. London: Arnold.
- Kula, Nancy C. (2000). The phonology/morphology interface: Consonant mutations in Bemba. In H. de Hoop & T. van der Wouden (Eds.), Linguistics in the Netherlands 2000 (pp. 171–183). Amsterdam: John Benjamins.
- Nguyễn, Đình-Hoà. (1997). Vietnamese: Tiếng Việt không son phấn. Amsterdam: John Benjamins Publishing Company. ISBN 1-55619-733-0.
- Sapir, Edward. (1921). Language: An introduction to the study of speech. New York: Harcourt, Brace & Co.
- Spencer, Andrew; & Zwicky, Arnold M. (Eds.). (1998). The handbook of morphology. Oxford: Blackwell.
- Young, Robert W., & Morgan, William Sr. (1987). The Navajo language: A grammar and colloquial dictionary (rev. ed.). Albuquerque: University of New Mexico Press. ISBN 0-8263-1014-1.
