= Broken plural =

Irregular plural forms in Semitic and other Afroasiatic languages

In linguistics, a broken plural (or internal plural) is an irregular plural form of a noun or adjective found in Arabic and languages influenced by it such as Berber. Broken plurals are formed by changing the pattern of consonants and vowels inside the singular form. They contrast with sound plurals (or external plurals), which are formed by adding a suffix, but are also formally distinct from phenomena such as the Germanic umlaut, a form of vowel mutation used in plural forms in Germanic languages.

There have been a variety of theoretical approaches to understanding these processes and varied attempts to produce systems or rules that can systematize these plural forms. However the question of the origin of the broken plurals for the languages that exhibit them is not settled, though there are certain probabilities in distributions of specific plural forms in relation to specific singular patterns. As the conversions outgo by far the extent of mutations caused by the Germanic umlaut that is evidenced to be caused by inflectional suffixes, the sheer multiplicity of shapes corresponds to multiple attempts at historical explanation ranging from proposals of transphonologizations and multiple accentual changes to switches between the categories of collectives, abstracta and plurals or noun class switches.

== Arabic ==
In Arabic, the regular way of making a plural for a masculine noun is adding the suffix -ūn[a] (for the nominative) or -īn[a] (for the accusative and genitive). For feminine nouns the regular way is to add the suffix -āt. However not all plurals follow these simple rules. One class of nouns in both spoken and written Arabic produces plurals by changing the pattern of vowels inside the word, sometimes also with the addition of a prefix or suffix. This system is not fully regular and it is used mainly for masculine non-human nouns; human nouns are pluralized regularly or irregularly.

Broken plurals are known as jamʿu taksīr (جَمْعُ تَكْسِيرٍ, literally "plural of breaking") in Arabic grammar. These plurals constitute one of the most unusual aspects of the language, given the very strong and highly detailed grammar and derivation rules that govern the written language. Broken plurals can also be found in languages that have borrowed words from Arabic, for instance Persian, Pashto, Turkish, Azerbaijani, Sindhi and Urdu. Sometimes in these languages the same noun has both a broken plural Arabic form and a local plural.

In Persian this kind of plural is known by its Arabic term jamʿ-e mokassar (جَمِع مُکَسَّر, literally "broken plural"). However the Persian Academy of Literature (Farhangestan) does not recommend the usage of such Arabic plural forms but instead the native Persian plural suffix -hā.

Full knowledge of these plurals can come only with extended exposure to the Arabic language, though a few rules can be noted. One study computed the probability that the pattern of vowels in the singular would predict the pattern in the broken plural (or vice versa) and found values ranging from 20% to 100% for different patterns.

A statistical analysis of a list of the 3000 most frequent Arabic words shows that 978 (59%) of the 1670 most frequent nominal forms take a sound plural, while the remaining 692 (41%) take a broken plural. Another estimate of all existing nominal forms gives more than 90,000 forms with a sound plural and just 9540 with a broken one. This is due to the almost boundless number of participles and derived nominals in "-ī", most of which take a sound plural.

=== Example ===
Semitic languages typically utilize triconsonantal roots, forming a "grid" into which vowels may be inserted without affecting the basic root.

Here are a few examples; note that the commonality is in the root consonants (capitalized), not the vowels.

- KiTāB كِتَاب "book" → KuTuB كُتُب "books"
- KāTiB كَاتِب "writer, scribe" → KuTTāB كُتَّاب "writers, scribes"
- maKTūB مَكْتُوب "letter" → maKāTīB مَكَاتِيب "letters"
- maKTaB مَكْتَب "desk, office" → maKāTiB مَكَاتِب "offices"

note: these four words all have a common root, K-T-B ك – ت – ب "to write"

In the non-semitic Persian language it is current to use:

- KiTāB کِتَاب‌ "book" → KiTāBhā کِتَاب‌ْهَا "books"
- KāTiB كَاتِبْ‌ "writer, scribe" → KāTiBhā كَاتِبْ‌هَا "writers, scribes"

=== Patterns in Arabic ===
Singular form	Plural form	Singular example			Plural example			Other examples	Notes
CiCāC	CuCuC	كِتَاب	kitāb	'book'	كُتُب	kutub	'books'		
CaCīCah	CuCuC	سَفِينَة	safīnah	'ship'	سُفُن	sufun	'ships'	juzur (islands), mudun (cities)	
CaCv̄C	CuCuC	أَسَاس	ʾasās	'foundation'	أُسُس	ʾusus	'foundations'		
CaCv̄C	CuCuC	سَبِيل	sabīl	'path'	سُبُل	subul	'paths'	turuq (paths)	
CaCv̄C	CuCuC	رَسُول	rasūl	'messenger'	رُسُل	rusul	'messengers'		
CvCCah	CuCaC	شَقَّة	šaqqah	'apartment'	شُقَق	šuqaq	'apartments'		
CvCCah	CiCaC	قِطّة	qiṭṭah	'cat'	قِطَط	qiṭaṭ	'cats'		
CvCCah	CuCaC	غُرْفَة	ġurfah	'room'	غُرَف	ġuraf	'rooms'	sunan (habits)	
CiCC	CiCaCah	هِرّ	hirr	'cat'	هِرَرَة	hirarah	'cats'	fiyalah (elephants) qiradah (apes)	
CuCC	CiCaCah	دُبّ	dubb	'bear'	دِبَبَة	dibabah			
CvCC	CuCūC	قَلْب	qalb	'heart'	قُلُوب	qulūb	'hearts'	funūn (arts), buyūt (houses) judūd (grandfathers)	
CvCC	CuCūC	عِلْم	ʿilm	'science'	عُلُوم	ʿulūm	'sciences'		
CvCC	CuCūC	جُحْر	juḥr	'hole'	جُحُور	juḥūr	'holes'		
CvCC	CiCāC	كَلْب	kalb	'dog'	كِلَاب	kilāb	'dogs'		
CvCC	CiCāC	ظِلّ	ẓill	'shadow'	ظِلَال	ẓilāl	'shadows'		
CvCC	CiCāC	رُمْح	rumḥ	'spear'	رِمَاح	rimāḥ	'spears'		
CaCaC	CiCāC	جَمَل	jamal	'camel'	جِمَال	jimāl	'camels'		
CaCuC	CiCāC	رَجُل	rajul	'man'	رِجَال	rijāl	'men'		
CvCC	ʾaCCāC	يَوْم	yawm	'day'	أَيَّام	ʾayyām	'days'	ʾarbāb (masters) ʾajdād (grandfathers)	
CvCC	ʾaCCāC	جِنْس	jins	'kind, type'	أَجْنَاس	ʾajnās	'kinds, types'		
CvCC	ʾaCCāC	لُغْز	luḡz	'mystery'	أَلْغَاز	ʾalḡāz	'mysteries'	ʾaʿmaq (deeps)	
CaCaC	ʾaCCāC	سَبَب	sabab	'cause'	أَسْبَاب	ʾasbāb	'causes'	ʾawlād (boys), ʾaqlām (pens)	
CuCuC	ʾaCCāC	عُمُر	ʿumur	'lifespan'	أَعْمَار	ʾaʿmār	'lifespans'	ʾarbāʿ (quarters)	
CaCūC	ʾaCCiCah	عَمُود	ʿamūd	'pole'	أَعْمِدَة	ʾaʿmidah	'poles'		Ends with taʾ marbuta
CaCīC	ʾaCCiCāʾ	صَدِيق	ṣadīq	'friend'	أَصْدِقَاء	ʾaṣdiqāʾ	'friends'		
CaCīC	CuCaCāʾ	سَعِيد	saʿīd	'happy'	سُعَدَاء	suʿadāʾ	'happy'	wuzarāʾ (ministers) bukhalāʾ (cheapskates)	mostly for adjectives and occupational nouns
CāCiC	CuCCāC	كَاتِب	kātib	'writer'	كُتَّاب	kuttāb	'writers'	ṭullāb (students) sukkān (residents)	Gemination of the second root; mostly for the active participle of Form I verbs
CāCiC	CaCaCah	جَاهِل	jāhil	'ignorant'	جَهَلَة	jahalah	'ignorant'		
CāCiC	CuCCaC	سَاجِد	sājid	'prostrated'	سُجَّد	sujjad			
CāCiCah	CuCCaC	سَاجِدَة	sājidah	'prostrated' (Fem.)	سُجَّد	sujjad			
CāCiCah	CawāCiC	قَائِمَة	qāʾimah	'list'	قَوَائِم	qawāʾim	'lists'	bawārij (battleships)	
CāCūC	CawāCīC	صَارُوخ	ṣārūḫ	'rocket'	صَوَارِيخ	ṣawārīḫ	'rockets'	ḥawāsīb (computers), ṭawāwīs (peacocks)	
CiCāCah	CaCāʾiC	رِسَالَة	risālah	'message'	رَسَائِل	rasāʾil	'messages'	baṭāʾiq (cards)	
CaCīCah	CaCāʾiC	جَزِيرَة	jazīrah	'island'	جَزَائِر	jazāʾir	'islands'	haqāʾib (suitcases), daqāʾiq (minutes)	
CaCCaC	CaCāCiC	دَفْتَر	daftar	'notebook'	دَفَاتِر	dafātir	'notebooks'		applies to all four-literal nouns with short second vowel
CuCCuC	CaCāCiC	فُنْدُق	funduq	'hotel'	فَنَادِق	fanādiq	'hotels'		applies to all four-literal nouns with short second vowel
maCCaC	maCāCiC	مَلْبَس	malbas	'apparel'	مَلَابِس	malābis	'apparels'	makātib (offices)	Subcase of previous, with m as first literal
maCCiC	maCāCiC	مَسْجِد	masjid	'mosque'	مَسَاجِد	masājid	'mosques'	manāzil (houses)	Subcase of previous, with m as first literal
miCCaCah	maCāCiC	مِنْطَقَة	minṭaqah	'area'	مَنَاطِق	manāṭiq	'areas'		
CvCCv̄C	CaCāCīC	صَنْدُوق	ṣandūq	'box'	صَنَادِيق	ṣanādīq	'boxes'		applies to all four-literal nouns with long second vowel
miCCāC	maCāCīC	مِفْتَاح	miftāḥ	'key'	مَفَاتِيح	mafātīḥ	'keys'		Subcase of previous, with m as first literal
maCCūC	maCāCīC	مَكْتُوب	maktūb	'message'	مَكَاتِيب	makātīb	'messages'		Subcase of previous, with m as first literal

== Hebrew ==
In Hebrew, though all plurals must take either the -īm ־ים (generally masculine) or -ōt ־ות (generally feminine) plural suffixes, the historical stem alternations of the so-called segolate or consonant-cluster nouns between CVCC in the singular and CVCaC in the plural have often been compared to broken plural forms in other Semitic languages. Thus the form malkī מַלְכִּי "my king" in the singular is opposed to məlāxīm מְלָכִים "kings" in the plural.

In addition, there are many other cases where historical sound changes have resulted in stem allomorphy between singular and plural forms in Hebrew (or between absolute state and construct state, or between forms with pronominal suffixes and unsuffixed forms etc.), though such alternations do not operate according to general templates accommodating root consonants, and so are not usually considered to be true broken plurals by linguists.

== Geʽez & Amharic ==
Broken plurals were formerly used in some Ethiopic nouns. Examples include ˁanbässa "lion" with ˁanabəst "lions", kokäb "star" with kwakəbt "stars", ganen "demon" with aganənt "demons", and hagar "region" with ˀahgur "regions". Some of these broken plurals are still used in Amharic today, but they are generally seen as archaic. Some of these broken plurals took similar, but different meanings; ˀahgur is used in Amharic to refer to continents, while the plural of "region" is hagäroč. A generic word for God in both languages is ˁamlak (አምላክ) which is a broken plural of Malik, Proto-Semitic for king.

== See also ==
- Elative (gradation)
- Triconsonantal roots
- Nonconcatenative morphology
- Apophony

== Relevant literature ==
- Castagna, Giuliano. 2017. Towards a systematisation of the broken plural patterns in the Mehri language of Oman and Yemen. Quaderni di Vicino Oriente XII: 115–122. (read online)
