= Derived stem =

Morphological feature of verbs in Semitic languages

Derived stems are a morphological feature of verbs common to the Semitic languages. These derived verb stems are sometimes called augmentations or forms of the verb, or are identified by their Hebrew name binyan (meaning "building"), and sometimes correspond with additional semantic meaning such as passive or causative action.

Semitic languages make extensive use of nonconcatenative morphology, and most words share a set of two, three or four consonants which comprise a root wherein each root may be the basis for a number of conceptually related words. Traditionally, words are thought of as being derived from these root consonants, but a view increasingly held by contemporary linguists sees stem words being the source of derivations rather than consonantal roots. Regardless, each language features a number of set patterns for deriving verb stems from a given root or underived stem. Stems sharing the same root consonants represent separate verbs, albeit often semantically related, and each is the basis for its own conjugational paradigm. As a result, these derived stems are considered part of the system of morphological derivation, and not conjugation or inflection.

Typically, one stem is associated with the ordinary simple active verbs while others may be canonically associated with other grammatical functions such as the passive, the causative, the intensive, the reflexive, etc., or combinations thereof. These functions should not be taken as universal or absolute, but are better understood as relational, depending on the particular source of the derived stem. These grammatical functions are also not present in all Semitic languages. Some Neo-Aramaic languages, for example, have only two stems, one for monosyllabic verbs and the other for disyllabic verbs, with hardly any cases of related verbs in each stem.

== Synchronic examples ==
For example, in Arabic and Hebrew, words containing the root √k-t-b have a meaning related to writing (in Hebrew, a phonological process known as begadkefat, alters the quality of certain consonants when they follow a vowel, so b becomes v and k becomes ḵ (a voiceless velar fricative like German Bach); the symbol ⟨ː⟩ indicates the preceding consonant is doubled or geminate). Thus:

- In the basic stem, "he wrote" in Arabic is "kataba", and in Hebrew is "katav".
- In a causative stem, "he dictated" in Arabic is "ʔaktaba" and in Hebrew is "hiḵtīv".
- In the passive stem, "it was written" in Arabic is "inkataba" and in Hebrew is "niḵtav".
- In a reflexive stem, "he corresponded" in Arabic is "kātaba" and in Hebrew is "hitkatːēv".

The following two tables show the full paradigm of templates for the nine most common Arabic stems and the seven most common Hebrew stems, and illustrate some of the different meanings and functions that stems can have.

The first column gives the traditional stem abbreviation used by comparative semiticists and the second column gives typical stem names used in Arabic and Hebrew grammars; the Arabic system uses Roman numerals, and the Hebrew uses binyanim forms with the root letters √p-ʕ-l (with p sometimes becoming f by begadkefat). The next columns give the canonical functions of each stem, and their templates (the three Cs stand in for the three consonants of the root, and V stands for some vowel). Finally, the meaning and form of the stems with the √k-t-b root is given in the 3rd person masculine singular perfect, which lacks inflectional affixes.

Standard Arabic
Stem	Form (Note: Karin Ryding describes the Latin numeral numbering system for Arabic stems as "a widespread convention in the United States and Europe".)	Grammatical function	Template	Meaning	√k-t-b ك-ت-ب
G	I	base	CaCVCa	he wrote	KaTaBa كتب
Gt	VIII	reflexive of G	iCtaCaCa	he copied	iKtaTaBa => iKtaBa اكتتب => اكتب
D	II	multiplicative, transitivizing	CaCːaCa	he made to write	KaTtaBa كتتب
tD	V	reflexive of D	taCaCːaCa	-	-
L	III	conative, associative	CāCaCa	he corresponded	KāTaBa كاتب
tL	VI	reflexive of L	taCāCaCa	he exchanged letters	taKāTaBa تكاتب
C or Š	IV	causative	ʔaCCaCa	he dictated	ʔaKTaBa أكتب
Št	X	reflexive of Š	istaCCaCa	he asked to write	istaKTaBa استكتب
N	VII	passive, reflexive of G	inCaCaCa	he subscribed	inKaTaBa انكتب

Hebrew
Stem	Binyan	Grammatical function	Template	Meaning	√k-t-b כ-ת-ב
G	qal קל or paʕal פעל	base	CaCVC	he wrote	KaTaV כתב
D	piʕel פיעל	transitivizing, intensive	CiCːēC	he addressed/inscribed	KiTːēV כיתב
Du	puʕal פועל	passive of D	CuCːaC	he was addressed/inscribed	KuTːaV כותב
tD	hitpaʕel התפעל	reflexive of D	hitCaCːēC	he corresponded	hitKaTːēV התכתב
C or Š	hifʕil הפעיל	causative	hiCCīC	he dictated	hiḴTīV הכתיב
Cu or Šu	hufʕal הופעל	passive of Š	huCCaC	it was dictated	huḴTaV הוכתב
N	nifʕal נפעל	passive/reflexive of G	niCCaC	it was written	niḴTaV נכתב

The tD stem for Arabic is not given for the √k-t-b root because it does not occur, illustrating that not each root has an actual form for each stem; in fact, √k-t-b has a more complete stem paradigm than many other roots.

In each Semitic language, the number of derived stems is different. In Hebrew, both biblical and modern, there are seven common ones, and in Arabic there are nine common forms and at least six rare ones; Akkadian has thirteen common patterns, Ugaritic has ten, Syriac has eight common ones, Modern Aramaic languages range from two-four, and so on.

== Comparative morphology ==
There are different ways of naming stems, most systems classify stems by their morphological patterns but others simply number them. In Arabic, a system using Roman numerals is frequently used, as well as a more traditional system where the forms with the root letters √f-ʕ-l (roughly meaning "to do") are used as names of each stem. Hebrew also uses this latter system, although the cognate root used is √p-ʕ-l (with p sometimes surfacing as f by begadkefat). In Akkadian, forms with the √p-r-s root "to decide" are most often used. The convention using Latin letter abbreviations (such as G, Dt and Š) is a morphological shorthand used most often by comparative Semiticists, and emphasizes the relationships between stems within and between languages.

- G-stem is the base stem, from the German Grund ("ground")
- D-stem typically has a Doubled second root letter
- L-stem typically Lengthens the first vowel
- N-stem has a prefix with N
- C- or Š-stem often has a Causative meaning and has a prefix with Š (ʃ pronounced like English sh), S, H, or ʔ (the glottal stop).
- t stems (such as tG, tD, and Št) have an affix with t.

The following table compares some of the important stems of six different Semitic languages: Akkadian, Biblical Hebrew, Syriac, Standard Arabic, Geʿez, and Shehri (a.k.a. Jibbali), representing different Semitic subfamilies. By examining these and a few other forms, and using the comparative method and internal reconstruction, the grammatical function and template for the Proto-Semitic derived stems have been reconstructed. The asterisk (*) in the Proto-Semitic template column indicates that these forms are hypothetical and reconstructed.

Basics of Semitic Verbal Derivation
Stem	Proto-Semitic function (reconstructed)	Proto-Semitic template	East Semitic	Northwest Semitic		Arabic	South Semitic	
Stem	Proto-Semitic function (reconstructed)	Proto-Semitic template	Akkadian	Bibl. Hebrew	Syriac	Std. Arabic	Geʿez	Shehri
G	base	*CaCVCa	iCaCːVC	CaCVC	CCVC	CaCVCa	CaCVCa	CVCVC
tG	reflexive/mediopassive of G	*tCVCVCa	iCtaCːiC	-	ʔitCCiC	iCtaCaCa	taCaCCa	əCteˈCeC
D	multiplicative/transitivizing of G	*CaCːaCa	uCaCːaC	CiCːēC	CaCːiC	CaCːaCa	CaCːaCa	-
tD	reflexive of D	*tCaCːVCa	uCtaCːaC	hitCaCːēC	ʔitCaCːaC	taCaCːaCa	-	-
L	associative/intensive/causative	-	-	-	-	CāCaCa	CāCaCa	eˈCoCəC
tL	reflexive/mediopassive of L	-	-	-	-	taCāCaCa	-	-
Š	causative	*šaCCaCa	ušaCCaC	hiCCīC	ʔaCCiC	ʔaCCaCa	ʔaCCaCa	eCˈCeC
Št	reflexive/mediopassive of Š	*štaCCVCa	uštaCCaC	-	ʔitːaCCaC	istaCCaCa	ʔastaCCaCa	ŝəCˈCeC
ŠtG	causative of tG	*šatCVCVCa	uštaCaCːaC	-	-	-	-	ŝəˈCeCəC
N	reciprocal/passive of G	*nCaCVCa	inCaCːiC	niCCaC	-	inCaCaCa	-	-

Because the L stem is only attested in the geographically and genetically proximate Arabic and South Semitic languages, it is thought to be a later innovation, not present in Proto-Semitic. By contrast, since separate but morphologically similar Št and ŠtG stems are attested in the relatively distantly related Akkadian and Shehri, these are posited to have been different stems in Proto-Semitic, but to have merged in most later Semitic languages.
