= Semitic root =

Consonant roots in Semitic languages

The roots of verbs and most nouns in the Semitic languages are characterized as a sequence of consonants or "radicals" (hence the term consonantal root). Such abstract consonantal roots are used in the formation of actual words by adding the vowels and non-root consonants (or "transfixes"), which go with a particular morphological category around the root consonants, in an appropriate way, generally following specific patterns.

It is a peculiarity of Semitic linguistics that many of these consonantal roots are triliterals, meaning that they consist of three letters (although there are a number of quadriliterals, and in some languages also biliterals). Such roots are also common in other Afroasiatic languages. While Berber mostly has triconsonantal roots, Chadic, Omotic, and Cushitic have mostly biconsonantal roots; and Egyptian shows a mix of biconsonantal and triconsonantal roots.

== Triconsonantal roots ==
A triliteral or triconsonantal root (Arabic: جذر ثلاثي, jiḏr ṯulāṯī; Hebrew: שורש תלת־עיצורי, šoreš təlat-ʻiṣuri; Syriac: ܫܪܫܐ, šeršā) is a root containing a sequence of three consonants.

The following are some of the forms which can be derived from the triconsonantal root k-t-b כ־ת־ב ك-ت-ب (general overall meaning 'to write') in Hebrew and Arabic:

The Hebrew fricatives stemming from begadkefat lenition are transcribed here as ḵ, ṯ and ḇ, to retain their connection with the consonantal root כ־ת־ב k-t-b. They are pronounced [x], [θ], [β] in Biblical Hebrew and [χ], [t], [v] in Modern Hebrew respectively. Modern Hebrew has no gemination; where there was historically gemination, they are reduced to single consonants, with consonants in the begadkefat remaining the same.

Semitological abbreviation	Hebrew name		Arabic name		Morphological category	Hebrew form		Arabic form		Approximate translation
G verb stem	פָּעַל קָל	pā‘al qāl	فَعَلَ	fa‘ala (stem I)	3rd sg. m. perfect	כתב	kāṯaḇ	كتب	kataba	he wrote
G verb stem	פָּעַל קָל	pā‘al qāl	فَعَلَ	fa‘ala (stem I)	1st pl. perfect	כתבנו	kāṯaḇnū	كتبنا	katabnā	we wrote
G verb stem	פָּעַל קָל	pā‘al qāl	فَعَلَ	fa‘ala (stem I)	3rd sg. m. imperfect	יכתוב	yiḵtoḇ	يكتب	yaktubu	he writes, will write
G verb stem	פָּעַל קָל	pā‘al qāl	فَعَلَ	fa‘ala (stem I)	1st pl. imperfect	נכתוב	niḵtoḇ	نكتب	naktubu	we write, will write
G verb stem	פָּעַל קָל	pā‘al qāl	فَعَلَ	fa‘ala (stem I)	Sg. m. active participle	כותב	kōṯēḇ	كاتب	kātib	writer
š verb stem	הִפְעִיל	hip̄‘īl	أَفْعَلَ	af‘ala (stem IV)	3rd sg. m. perfect	הכתיב	hiḵtīḇ	أكتب	ʔaktaba	he dictated
š verb stem	הִפְעִיל	hip̄‘īl	أَفْعَلَ	af‘ala (stem IV)	3rd sg. m. imperfect	יכתיב	yaḵtīḇ	يكتب	yuktibu	he dictates, will dictate
št(D) verb stem	הִתְפָּעֵל	hiṯpā‘ēl	استَفْعَلَ	istaf‘ala (stem X)	3rd sg. m. perfect	התכתב	hiṯkattēḇ	استكتب	istaktaba	he corresponded (Hebrew), had a copy made (Arabic)
št(D) verb stem	הִתְפָּעֵל	hiṯpā‘ēl	استَفْعَلَ	istaf‘ala (stem X)	3rd sg. m. imperfect	יתכתב	yiṯkattēḇ	يستكتب	yastaktibu	(imperfect of above)
noun with m- prefix & original short vowels	מִפְעָל	mip̄‘āl	مَفْعَل	maf‘al	singular	מכתב	miḵtāḇ	مكتب	maktab	letter (Hebrew), office (Arabic)

In Hebrew grammatical terminology, the word binyan (בניין / בִּנְיָן) is used to refer to a verb derived stem or overall verb derivation pattern, while the word mishkal (מִשְׁקָל) is used to refer to a noun derivation pattern, and these words have gained some use in English-language linguistic terminology. The equivalent terms in Arabic grammatical terminology are wazn (وَزْن) for the pattern, and jaḏr (جَذْر) or jiḏr (جِذْر) for the root, but these have not gained the same currency in cross-linguistic Semitic scholarship as the Hebrew equivalents; Western grammarians continue to use the terms "stem", "form" or "pattern" for the former, and "root" for the latter.

=== Biliteral origin of some triliteral roots ===
Although most roots in Hebrew seem to be triliteral, many of them were originally biliteral; compare the relation between:

ג־ז √g-z
ג־ז־ז	√g-z-z	'shear'
ג־ז־ם	√g-z-m	'prune; cut down'
ג־ז־ר	√g-z-r	'cut'

פ־ר √p-r
פ־ר־ז	√p-r-z	'divide a city'
פ־ר־ט	√p-r-ṭ	'give change'
פ־ר־ר	√p-r-r	'crumble into pieces'
פ־ר־ע	√p-r-‘	'pay a debt'

The Hebrew root ש־ק־ף – √sh-q-p 'look out; look through; reflect', deriving from ק־ף – √q-p 'bend; arch; lean towards' and similar verbs fit into the shaCCéC verb-pattern.

ק־פ √q-p
ק־פ־א	√q-p-'
ק־פ־ה	√q-p-h
ק־פ־ח	√q-p-ḥ
ק־פ־י	√q-p-y

This verb-pattern sh-C-C is usually causative:

ט־ף	√ṭ-p	'wet'	ש־ט־ף	√š-ṭ-p	'wash; rinse; make wet'
ל־ך	√l-k	'go'	ש־ל־ך	√š-l-k	'cast off; throw down; cause to go'

=== History ===
There is debate about whether both biconsonantal and triconsonantal roots were represented in Proto-Afroasiatic, or whether one or the other of them was the original form of the Afroasiatic verb. According to one study of the Proto-Semitic lexicon, biconsonantal roots are more abundant for words denoting Stone Age materials, whereas materials discovered during the Neolithic are uniquely triconsonantal. This implies a change in Proto-Semitic language structure concomitant with the transition to agriculture. In particular, monosyllabic biconsonantal names are associated with a pre-Natufian cultural background, i.e., older than c. 14,500 BCE. As we have no texts from any Semitic language older than c. 3500 BCE, reconstructions of Proto-Semitic are inferred from these more recent Semitic texts.

== Quadriliteral roots ==
A quadriliteral is a consonantal root containing a sequence of four consonants (instead of three consonants, as is more often the case). A quadriliteral form is a word derived from such a four-consonant root. For example, the abstract quadriliteral root t-r-g-m / t-r-j-m gives rise to the verb forms תרגם tirgem in Aramaic and Hebrew, ترجم tarjama in Arabic, ተረጐመ täräggwämä in Amharic, all meaning 'he translated'. In some cases, a quadriliteral root is actually a reduplication of a two-consonant sequence. So in Arabic دغدغ daġdaġa and Hebrew דגדג digdeg (borrowed from Arabic) means 'he tickled' from the reduplicated root d-ġ-d-ġ, and in Arabic زلزل zalzala means 'he shook' from the root z-l-z-l. Other Arabic example include بعثر baʕṯara 'he scattered', مرجح marjaḥa 'he swung', and قرفص qarfaṣa 'he squatted'.

Generally, only a subset of the verb derivations formed from triliteral roots are allowed with quadriliteral roots. For example, in Hebrew, the Piʿel, Puʿal, and Hiṯpaʿel, and in Arabic, forms similar to the stem II and stem V forms of triliteral roots.

Another set of quadriliteral roots in modern Hebrew is the set of secondary roots. A secondary root is a root derived from a word that was derived from another root. For example, the root מ־ס־פ־ר m-s-p-r is secondary to the root ס־פ־ר s-p-r. סָפַר saphar, from the root s-p-r, means 'counted'; מִסְפָּר mispar, from the same root, means 'number'; and מִסְפֵּר misper, from the secondary root מ־ס־פ־ר, means 'numbered'.

An irregular quadriliteral verb made from a loanword is:

- נַשְׁפְּרִיץ nashprits (/naʃˈpʁit͡s/) – 'we will sprinkle; we will splash', from Yiddish שפּריצן shpritsn (cognate with German spritzen).

== Quinqueliteral roots ==
A quinqueliteral is a consonantal root containing a sequence of five consonants. Traditionally, in Semitic languages, forms with more than four basic consonants (i.e. consonants not introduced by morphological inflection or derivation) were occasionally found in nouns and adjectives, and mainly in loanwords from other languages, but never in verbs. For example, Arabic عرمرم ʕaramram means 'numerous', عنكبوت ʕankabūt means 'spider'and غضنفر ḡaḍanfar means 'lion'. However, in modern Israeli Hebrew, syllables are allowed to begin with a sequence of two consonants (a relaxation of the situation in early Semitic, where only one consonant was allowed), which has opened the door for a very small set of loan words to manifest apparent five root-consonant forms, such as טלגרף tilgref 'he telegraphed'. However, -lgr- always appears as an indivisible cluster in the derivation of this verb and so the five root-consonant forms do not display any fundamentally different morphological patterns from four root-consonant forms (and the term "quinqueliteral" or "quinquiliteral" would be misleading if it implied otherwise). Only a few Hebrew quinqueliterals are recognized by the Academy of the Hebrew Language as proper, or standard; the rest are considered slang.

Other examples are:

- סִנְכְּרֵן (/sinˈkren/ – 'he synchronized'), via the English word from Greek
- חִנְטְרֵשׁ (/χinˈtreʃ/ – 'he did stupid things')
- הִתְפְלַרְטֵט (/hitflarˈtet/ – 'he flirted'), from the English or Yiddish past tense of the English word

In Amharic, there is a very small set of verbs which are conjugated as quinqueliteral roots. One example is wäšänäffärä 'rain fell with a strong wind'. The conjugation of this small class of verb roots is explained by Wolf Leslau. Unlike the Hebrew examples, these roots conjugate in a manner more like regular verbs, producing no indivisible clusters.

== See also ==
- Apophony
- Arabic grammar
- Broken plural
- Indo-European ablaut
- Khuzdul
- K-T-B
- Modern Hebrew grammar
- Nonconcatenative morphology
- Phono-semantic matching
- Proto-Indo-European root
- Š-L-M
- Transfix
