= Disfix =

Subtractive morpheme

In linguistic morphology, a disfix is a subtractive morpheme, a morpheme manifest through the subtraction of segments from a root or stem. Although other forms of disfixation exist, the element subtracted is usually the final segment of the stem.

Productive disfixation is extremely rare among the languages of the world but is important in the Muskogean languages of the southeastern United States. Similar subtractive morphs have a marginal presence in languages such as French and Portuguese.

== Terminology ==
The terms "disfix" and "disfixation" were proposed by Hardy and Timothy Montler in a 1988 paper on the morphology of the Alabama language. The process had been previously described by Leonard Bloomfield who called it a minus feature, and Zellig Harris who called it a "minus morpheme". Other terms for the same or similar processes are subtraction, truncation, deletion, and minus formation.

== Examples ==
=== Muskogean ===
In Muskogean, disfixes mark pluractionality (repeated action, plural subjects or objects, or greater duration of a verb). In the Alabama language, there are two principal forms of this morpheme:

- In most verbs, the last two segments are dropped from the penultimate syllable of the stem, which is the final syllable of the root. If the syllable has only two segments, it is elided altogether. For example:

balaaka 'lies down', balka 'lie down'
batatli 'hits', batli 'hits repeatedly'
cokkalika 'enters', cokkaka 'enter'

- In some verbs, the final consonant of the penult is dropped, but the preceding vowel lengthens to compensate:

salatli "slide", salaali 'slide repeatedly'
noktiłifka "choke", noktiłiika 'choke repeatedly'

=== French ===
Bloomfield described the process of disfixation (which he called minus features) through an example from French although most contemporary analyses find this example to be inadequate because the masculine forms might be taken as the base form and the feminine forms simply as suppletives. Though not productive like Muscogean and therefore not true disfixation, some French plurals are analysed as derived from the singular, and many masculine words from the feminine by dropping the final consonant and making some generally predictable changes to the vowel:

Disfixed plural
Singular	Plural	trans.
[bœf] (bœuf)	[bø] (bœufs)	'cattle'
[œf] (œuf)	[ø] (œufs)	'eggs'
[ɔs] (os)	[o] (os)	'bones'

"Disfixed" masculines
Feminine	Masculine	trans.
[blɑ̃ʃ] (blanche)	[blɑ̃] (blanc)	'white'
[fʁɛːʃ] (fraîche)	[fʁɛ] (frais)	'fresh'
[sɛʃ] (sèche)	[sɛk] (sec)	'dry'
[ɡʁos] (grosse)	[ɡʁo] (gros)	'large'
[fos] (fausse)	[fo] (faux)	'wrong'
[fʁɑ̃sɛːz] (française)	[fʁɑ̃sɛ] (français)	'French'
[ɑ̃ɡlɛːz] (anglaise)	[ɑ̃ɡlɛ] (anglais)	'English'
[fʁwad] (froide)	[fʁwɑ] (froid)	'cold'
[ɡʁɑ̃d] (grande)	[ɡʁɑ̃] (grand)	'big'
[pətit] (petite)	[pəti] (petit)	'small'
[fʁit] (frite)	[fʁi] (frit)	'fried'
[bɔn] (bonne)	[bɔ̃] (bon)	'good'
[bʁyn] (brune)	[bʁœ̃] (brun)	'brown'
[fɔl] (folle)	[fu] (fou)	'insane'
[bɛl] (belle)	[bo] (beau)	'beautiful'
[nuvɛl] (nouvelle)	[nuvo] (nouveau)	'new'
[vjɛj] (vieille)	[vjø] (vieux)	'old'
[epuz] (épouse)	[epu] (époux)	'spouse'
[ʃamɛl] (chamelle)	[ʃamo] (chameau)	'camel'

Historically, this reflects that the masculine was once pronounced similar to the current feminine, and the feminine formed by adding /ə/. The modern situation results from regular apocope which removed a consonant from the masculine and the final schwa of the feminine.

=== Portuguese ===
In Portuguese, some words which have the masculine ending -ão have a feminine equivalent -ã, synchronically analyzable as a disfixation.

- irmão - irmã (brother - sister)
- cristão - cristã (Christian m. - Christian f.)
- bretão - bretã (Breton m. - Breton f.)
- artesão - artesã (craftsman - craftswoman)
- órfão - órfã (orphan m. - orphan f.)
- charlatão - charlatã (conman - conwoman)

The root cause of this disfixation is the loss of intervocalic -n- in the evolution of Latin to Portuguese. Therefore, the Latin ending -anus became -ão in Portuguese and its feminine -ana became -ãa and then -ã. For comparison, notice the Spanish equivalents hermano-hermana, cristiano-cristiana, etc.

Not all words with -ão come from Latin -anus, meaning that their feminine derivation will be different (cf. leão-leoa, for instance). There are also words whose disfixation was made by comparison (the case of charlatão, which is a French loanword).

There are also two words which have feminine derivations made through disfixation: mau (bad) and réu (defendant, as used in law), whose feminines are má and ré respectively.

=== Estonian ===
Genitive forms of nouns belonging to the Estonian nominal types 5e, 7, and 7e, are formed by disfixing the last consonant -s, may be also accompanied with reverse consonant gradation: kallas → genitive kalda "shore".

=== Livonian ===
Similar to Estonian above, Livonian also sometimes employs disfixation to form genitives. Nominal types 168, 179–185, and 226–231 simply remove -z (or -ž in type 231): käbrāz → genitive käbrā "nimble", while modification in types 169–178 are more complex, involving vowel alteration while also removing -z: tōvaz → genitive touva "sky".

== See also ==
- Nonconcatenative morphology
- Affix
- Elision

== Bibliography ==
- Bloomfield, Leonard. 1933. Language. New York, NY: Holt [British edition 1935]: London: Allen and Unwin.
- George Aaron Broadwell. "Subtractive Morphology in Southern Muskogean", International Journal of American Linguistics, Vol. 59, No. 4, Muskogean Languages of the Southeast (Oct., 1993), pp. 416-429
- Heather Hardy and Timothy Montler, 1988. "Alabama H-infix and Disfixation", in William Shipley, ed., In Honor of Mary Haas: From the Haas Festival Conference on Native American Linguistics. Mouton de Gruyter. ISBN 3-11-011165-9
- Stela Manova. Subtraction. Understanding Morphological Rules: Studies in Morphology Volume 1, 2011, pp 125–172
