= Simulfix =

Affix that changes one or more phonemes

In linguistics, a simulfix is a type of affix that changes one or more existing phonemes (usually vowels) in order to modify the meaning of a morpheme.

Examples of simulfixes in English are generally considered irregularities, surviving results of Germanic umlaut. They include:

- man → men, woman → women
- louse → lice, mouse → mice
- foot → feet, tooth → teeth

The transfixes of the Semitic languages may be considered a form of discontinuous simulfix.

In Javanese and colloquial Indonesian, simulfixation productively occurs to form active verbs and to derive verbs from noun bases. For example:

- cuci → nyuci (to wash)
- tulis → nulis (to write)
- kopi (coffee) → ngopi (to drink coffee)
- sapu (broom) → nyapu (to sweep)
- tongkrong (hangout) → nongkrong (to hang out)
- pacul (hoe) → macul (to hoe)

== See also ==
- Apophony
