= Transfix =

Concept in linguistics

In linguistic morphology, a transfix is a discontinuous affix which is inserted into a word root, as in root-and-pattern systems of morphology, like those of many Semitic languages.

A discontinuous affix is an affix whose phonetic components are not sequential within a word, and instead, are spread out between or around the phones that comprise the root. The word root is often an abstract series of three consonants, though single consonant, biliteral, and quadriliteral roots do exist. An example of a triconsonantal root would be ḍ–r–b (ض ر ب) in Arabic, which can be inflected to create forms such as ḍaraba 'he beat' and yaḍribu 'he beats'. While triconsonantal roots are widely considered to be the most common state, some linguists posit that biliteral roots may in fact be the default, though at least one scholar is skeptical of the legitimacy of these claims.

Transfixes are placed into these roots in assigned positions, dictated by templates which are tied to the specific meaning of a given inflection or derivation. The transfixes in the examples above are –a–a–a and ya––i–u.

Transfixes are different from prefixes, suffixes, and infixes in that a complete transfix is the entire structure which is placed into a root. A transfix is not a combination of prefixes, suffixes, and infixes, but its own unique structure which is split through a word. Similarly, another difference transfixes hold from other affixes is that the individual components of the transfix are meaningless on their own. If we look again at ḍaraba, the components of the –a–a–a transfix do not encode any meaning individually. Only together do they create the tense meaning.

The following are examples of verb inflection in Maltese, noun derivation in Arabic, and noun pluralization in Hausa, all three of which are Afro-Asiatic languages.

Maltese indicative inflections of the root q–t–l: Perfect and Imperfect
			Perfect		Imperfect	
1st person	Singular		qtilt	"I killed"	noqtol	"I kill"
1st person	Plural		qtilna	"We killed"	noqtlu	"We kill"
2nd person	Singular		qtilt	"You killed"	toqtol	"You kill"
2nd person	Plural		qtiltu	"You killed"	toqtlu	"You kill"
3rd person	Singular	Masc.	qatel	"He killed"	joqtol	"He kills"
3rd person	Singular	Fem.	qatlet	"She killed"	toqtol	"She kills"
3rd person	Plural		qatlu	"They killed"	joqtlu	"They kill"

The Maltese example efficiently demonstrates the broad nature of transfixes and how they can be inserted into a root.

Arabic derivatives from the root k–t–b (ك-ت-ب)
Arabic transliteration	Translation
kataba كتب	'he wrote'
yaktubu يكتب	'he is writing'
kātib كاتب	'writer'
maktūb مكتوب	'written'
katb كتب	'writing' (noun)
maktab مكتب	'office'
makātib مكاتب	'offices'
kattaba كتب	'he made (someone) write'
ʾaktaba أكتب	'he dictated'
inkataba انكتب	'he subscribed'
iktataba اكتتب	'he copied'
takātabū تكاتبوا	'they corresponded with each other'
istaktaba استكتب	'he dictated'

The Arabic example shows the ways in which a great variety of different nouns and verbs can be derived from a single root through the use of transfixes.

Noun pluralization in Hausa
Singular		Plural	
zártòò	"saw"	zárààtáá	"saws"
ɡárkèè	"herd"	ɡárààkáá	"herds"
sárkʲíí	"emir"	sàrààkáí	"emirs"
ɡʷúrɡʷùù	"cripple"	ɡʷúrààɡʷúú	"cripples"
ʔárzìkʲíí	"fortune"	ʔárzúkàà	"fortunes"

The Hausa example demonstrates the presence of transfixation in non-Semitic languages, though the phenomenon does not seem to be attested outside the Afro-Asiatic family.

== See also ==
- Nonconcatenative morphology
- Affix
- Prefix
- Suffix
- Infix
- Circumfix
- Interfix
- Simulfix
- Suprafix
- Duplifix
