= Suprafix =

Affix giving a suprasegmental pattern in linguistics

In linguistics, a suprafix is a type of affix that gives a suprasegmental pattern (such as tone, stress, or nasalization) to either a neutral base or a base with a preexisting suprasegmental pattern. This affix will, then, convey a derivational or inflectional meaning. This suprasegmental pattern acts like segmental phonemes within a morpheme; the suprafix is a combination of suprasegmental phonemes, organized into a pattern, that creates a morpheme. For example, a number of African languages express tense / aspect distinctions by tone. English has a process of changing stress on verbs to create nouns.

== History ==
Driven by structural linguists in the United States, the suprafix was more frequently used by such linguists during the time of American structuralism. The idea of suprasegmental morphemes was introduced in Eugene Nida's morphology textbook, where he suggested the term, suprafix, to account for these kinds of morphemes; the term was adopted by George L. Trager and Henry Lee Smith Jr. in their paper on the structure of English. It was further described in Edith Trager's article on the suprafix in English verbal compounds and in Archibald A. Hill's introductory linguistics of English text. Later, it was taken up in Peter Matthews' influential morphology textbook.

Some linguists prefer superfix, which was introduced by George L. Trager for the stress pattern of a word, which he regarded as a special morpheme that combines and unifies the parts of a word. Another term that has not been widely adopted, but has been suggested to replace suprafix or superfix, is simulfix. This word has been offered as a replacement term because many linguists have noted that the addition of suprasegmental phonemes is added neither above nor below the segmental phonemes; instead it is affixed altogether. However, a simulfix has been used to describe different morphological phenomena and, therefore, has not been adopted for the purposes defined here.

== Types ==
There are two different types of suprafixes: additive and replacive. Suprafixes are additive if they add a suprasegmental pattern to the base form, and replacive suprafixes simply change the pattern from the base form to a new pattern that conveys a different meaning.

=== Additive suprafixes ===
Additive suprafixes are affixes that add suprasegmental phonemes to the base. Such processes occur as a result of an underlying pattern of stress, tones, or even nasalization being added to an underlying morpheme composed of only segmental phonemes. In other words, the affix is attached to a bare base that has no other suprasegmental pattern underlyingly. That can fall under a broader category of additive morphology (e.g. processes of prefixation, suffixation, infixation). This is exemplified by a language in the Democratic Republic of the Congo, Ngbaka: wà, wā, wǎ and wá all mean 'clean'. Nida, however, explains that the segmental base contains the meaning 'to clean', but the different tones associated with the base reveal different tense/aspect information.

=== Replacive suprafixes ===
Replacive suprafixes are affixes that replace suprasegmental phonemes of the base form. Such processes occur as a result of an underlying pattern of stress, tones or nasalization replacing a previous pattern of suprasegmental phonemes. More succinctly, the process involves stripping one suprasegmental pattern for another to convey a different meaning. That can fall under a broader category of replacive morphology. In this kind of morphology, some particular phoneme or phonemes are being replaced by another to attribute a different meaning. An example can be found in another language from the Democratic Republic of Congo, Mongbandi: ngbò and ngbó both mean 'swam'. However, Nida explains that the first word is the base form, and the second shows the verb in second-person plural. Since the second-person plural suprafix replaces the tonal pattern of the base form, it is a replacive suprafix.

== In English ==
The suprafix can also be defined as an underlying suprasegmental pattern that indicates a property of a particular type of phrase in a language but especially for English. Such patterns are most notable between an individually-uttered word and the same word in a larger phrase. Consider, for example, the word house, which has no internal stress pattern, alone. However, within a phrase like the white house (e.g. /ðə ʍàɪt hâʊs/) versus the White House (e.g. /ðə ʍáɪt hàʊs/), the stress on the word house changes.

English also uses a process of replacive suprafixes in which base form verbs are changed to nouns by replacing the stress pattern alone: 'import (n) vs. im'port (v) and 'insult (n) vs. in'sult (v). The stress pattern alters to signal the difference between noun and verb.

== In Tibetan ==
In Tibetan, replacive suprafixes in stress are used to disambiguate many noun and verb homographs, in a way similar to English (e.g. 'import (n) vs. im'port (v), as described above). For example, the Tibetan word ལྟ་བ (Wylie: lta ba, IPA: [ˈta˥˥.wa]), with stress on the first syllable is a verb, meaning “to look”, while its homograph ལྟ་བ (Wylie: lta ba, IPA: [ta˥˥.ˈwa]), with stress on the second syllable is a noun, meaning a “view/outlook/sight”. This pattern of replacive suprafixes with stress, where homograph verbs and nouns are stressed on their first and second syllables, respectively, can be generalized in Tibetan, since a large number of verbs and nouns are two-syllable words consisting of a single-syllable free morpheme (and semantic root) followed by either of the two bound morphemes and nominalizing particles པ (Wylie: pa, IPA: [pa]) or བ (Wylie: ba, IPA: [wa]) (which of the two particles follows is determined by euphony rules, based on the final letter of the preceding syllable).

Additionally, in the literary register of Tibetan (and to some extent in the colloquial register as well, although herein less often realized), a separate system of replacive suprafixes in aspiration allows speakers to disambiguate otherwise identically-pronounced volitional and non-volitional forms (this extends in some cases to transitivity, although this is a separate, yet often interrelated concept in Tibetan, usually conceived of as a causative/resultative relationship) of the same verb. For example, the Tibetan verb སྐོལ་བ (Wylie: skol ba, IPA: [ˈkøː˥˥.wa]) means “to boil” (volitional/transitive/causative—e.g. “He boiled the water”), while the verb འཁོལ་བ (Wylie: ‘khol ba, IPA: [ˈkʰøː˥˥.wa]) means “to boil” (non-volitional/intransitive/resultative—e.g. “The water is boiling”). Several other pairs of such verbs exist in Tibetan, for example བཅག་པ (Wylie: bcag pa)/ཆག་པ (Wylie: chag pa) ”to break” (causative/resultative), སྐོར་བ (Wylie: skor ba)/འཁོར་བ (Wylie: ‘khor ba) “to turn/rotate” (causative/resultative), and སྤར་བ (Wylie: spar ba)/འཕར་བ (Wylie: ‘phar ba) “to increase/raise” (causative/resultative). Though the verbs in each of these pairs of verbs differ in orthography, their pronunciation (including tone) is the same, but for the added aspiration in the involuntary verb, and other than in a difference in causativity (again, this can manifest in a complex interrelation of volition, transitivity, and causativity), their meanings are otherwise identical.

== In other languages ==
In the Ma'ya language of Indonesia, there is a toneme that marks a replacive morpheme that is also described as a suprafix. Lex van der Leeden describes the language as having a toneme pattern, such as a class 12 toneme pattern of the language being replaced by a class 21 toneme pattern. He notes that they are inflectional changes.

In the Waurá language of Brazil, there is a nasalization suprafix that arises when the word is placed in a possessive construction: nu-mapã́, 'my honey' and mápa, 'honey'.

In Ngbaka, there are examples of additive suprafixes. The segmental string that constitutes the morpheme meaning 'to return' is kpolo. However, when the four different additive suprafixes are affixed, a change in tense/aspect is realised: kpòlò, kpōlō, kpòló and kpóló.

== See also ==
- Initial-stress-derived noun
- Conversion
- Simulfix
