= Separable verb =

Verb with a prefix which separates from the core verb in certain positions in a sentence

A separable verb is a verb that is composed of a lexical core and a separable particle. In some sentence positions, the core verb and the particle appear as one word, whilst in others the core verb and the particle are separated. The particle is traditionally referred to as a "separable prefix". German, Dutch, Yiddish, Afrikaans and Hungarian are notable for having many separable verbs.

== Examples ==
The German verb ankommen is a separable verb, and is used here as the first illustration:

Sie kommt sofort an.
she comes immediately at
'She is arriving immediately.'

Sie kam sofort an.
she came immediately at
'She arrived immediately.'

Sie wird sofort ankommen.
she will immediately at.come
'She will arrive immediately.'

Sie ist sofort angekommen.
she is immediately at.come
'She arrived immediately.'

The first two examples, sentences a and b, contain the "simple" tenses. In matrix declarative clauses that lack auxiliary verbs, the verb and its particle an- (both in bold) are separated, the verb appearing in V2 position and the particle appearing in clause-final position. The second two examples, sentences c and d, contain the so-called "complex tenses"; they show that when an auxiliary verb appears, the separable verb is not separated, but rather the stem verb and particle appear together as a single word.

The following two examples are from Dutch:

Ik kom morgen aan.
I come tomorrow at
'I am arriving tomorrow.'

Hij is aangekomen.
he is at.come
'He has arrived.'

The Dutch verb aankomen is separable, as illustrated in the first sentence with the simple present tense, whereas when an auxiliary verb appears (here is) as in the second sentence with present perfect tense/aspect, the lexical verb and its particle aan- appear together as a single word.

The following examples are from Hungarian:

Leteszem a telefont.
up.I.hang the phone
'I hang up the phone.'

Nem teszem le a telefont.
not I.hang up the phone
'I do not hang up the phone.'

The verb letesz (le- prefix) is separated in the negative sentence. Affixes in Hungarian are also separated from the verb in imperative and prohibitive moods. Moreover, word order influences the strength of prohibition, as the following examples show:

Ne tedd le a telefont.
not hang up the phone
'Don't hang up the phone.'

Le ne tedd a telefont.
up not hang the phone
'Don't you hang up the phone!' (stronger prohibition)

== Analogy to English ==
English has many phrasal or compound verb forms that are somewhat analogous to separable verbs. However, in English the particle is always a separate word (e.g. give up), without the possibility of grammatically conditioned alternations between the two. An adverbial particle can be separated from the verb by intervening words (e.g. up in the phrasal verb screw up appears after the direct object, things, in the sentence He is always screwing things up). Although the verbs themselves never alternate between prefix and separate word, the alternation is occasionally seen across derived words (e.g. outstanding ↔ stand out) (prefix out- ↔ particle out).

== Structural analysis ==
Separable verbs challenge the understanding of meaning compositionality because when they are separated, the two parts do not form a constituent. Hence theories of syntax that assume that form–meaning correspondences should be understood in terms of syntactic constituents are faced with a difficulty, because it is not apparent what sort of syntactic unit the verb and its particle build. One prominent means of addressing this difficulty is via movement. Given that languages like German and Dutch are actually subject–object–verb (SOV) languages (as opposed to SVO), when separation occurs, the lexical verb must have moved out of the clause-final position to a derived position further to the left, e.g. in German

The verb kommt is seen as originating in a position where it appeared with its particle an-, but it then moves leftward to the V2 position.

== Different meaning ==
When a prefix can be used both separably and inseparably, there are cases where the same verb can have different meanings depending on whether its prefix is separable or inseparable (an equivalent example in English would be take over and overtake) (prefix over- ↔ particle over).

=== German ===
In German, among other languages, some verbs can exist as separable and inseparable forms with different meanings. For the verb umfahren (particle um-) one even gets opposite meanings:

inseparable: Ich umfahre den Fußgänger. — I drive around the pedestrian.
separable: Ich fahre den Fußgänger um. — I hit (while driving) and knock over the pedestrian.
either – ambiguous: Soll ich denn den Fußgänger umfahren? — So should I avoid the pedestrian? or So should I hit the pedestrian?

The infinitive forms of these two verbs umfahren are only identical in written form. When spoken, the inseparable form is stressed as umfahren, whereas the separable is stressed as umfahren.

=== Dutch ===
The same happens in Dutch, which is related to German and English. Sometimes the meanings are quite different, even if they have correspondences in the cognate English verbs:

ondergaan, past tense ging onder, past participle ondergegaan (separable, intransitive): to go under (to sink; to drown).
ondergaan, past tense onderging, past participle ondergaan (inseparable, transitive, prefixed): to undergo (to be subjected to).

Examples:

Het schip ging ergens veraf onder. The ship went under (i.e. sank) somewhere far away.
Vandaag onderging mijn schoonbroer een aanwervingsproef. Today, my brother-in-law underwent a recruitment test.

The infinitive of these two verbs ondergaan (particle onder-) are only identical in written form. When spoken, the separable form is stressed as ondergaan, whereas the inseparable is stressed as ondergaan.
