= Affix =

Morpheme that is attached to a word stem to form a new word

In linguistics, an affix is a morpheme that is attached to a word stem to form a new word or word form. The two main categories are derivational and inflectional affixes. Derivational affixes, such as un-, -ation, anti-, and pre-, introduce a semantic change to the word they are attached to. Inflectional affixes introduce a syntactic change, such as singular into plural (e.g. -(e)s), or present simple tense into present continuous or past tense by adding -ing or -ed to an English word. All of them are bound morphemes by definition; prefixes and suffixes may be separable affixes.

== Affixes, infixes and their variations ==
Adding a morpheme at the beginning of a word is called prefixation, in the middle infixation, and at the end suffixation.

Categories of affixes
Affix	Example	Schema	Description
Prefix/superfix	un-do	prefix-stem	Appears before the stem
Prefixoid/semi-prefix/pseudo-prefix	flexi-cover	prefixoid-stem	Appears before the stem, but is only partially bound to it
Suffix/postfix	look-ing	stem-suffix	Appears after the stem
Suffixoid/semi-suffix/pseudo-suffix	cat-like	stem-suffixoid	Appears after the stem, but is only partially bound to it
Infix (see also tmesis)	edu⟨ma⟩cated	st⟨infix⟩em	Appears within a stem — common e.g. in Austroasiatic languages or Austronesian languages
Circumfix	en⟩light⟨en	circumfix⟩stem⟨circumfix	One portion appears before the stem, the other after
Interfix	speed-o-meter	stem_{a}-interfix-stem_{b}	Links two stems together in a compound
Duplifix	money~shmoney (shm-reduplication)	stem~duplifix	Incorporates a reduplicated portion of a stem (may occur before, after, or within the stem)
Transfix	Maltese: k⟨i⟩t⟨e⟩b "he wrote" (compare root ktb "write")	s⟨transfix⟩te⟨transfix⟩m	A discontinuous affix that interleaves within a discontinuous stem
Simulfix	mouse → mice	stem\simulfix	Changes a segment of a stem
Suprafix	produce (noun) produce (verb)	stem\suprafix	Changes a suprasegmental feature of a stem
Disfix	Alabama: tipli "break up" (compare root tipasli "break")	st⟩disfix⟨em	The elision of a portion of a stem

Prefix and suffix may be subsumed under the term adfix, in contrast to infix.

When marking text for interlinear glossing, as shown in the third column in the chart above, simple affixes such as prefixes and suffixes are separated from the stem with hyphens. Affixes that disrupt the stem, or that are themselves discontinuous, are often marked off with angle brackets. Reduplication is often shown with a tilde. Affixes which cannot be segmented are marked with a back slash.

== Lexical affixes ==
Semantically, lexical or semantic affixes often convey more general or abstract meanings than their corresponding free nouns. For instance, an affix meaning “water” in a broad sense may lack a direct noun equivalent, since available nouns typically refer to more specific types such as “saltwater” or “whitewater.” (while in other cases the lexical suffixes have become grammaticalized to various degrees.) Although they behave as incorporated noun roots/stems within verbs and as elements of nouns, they never occur as freestanding nouns. Lexical affixes are relatively rare and are used in Wakashan, Salishan, and Chimakuan languages — the presence of these is an areal feature of the Pacific Northwest of North America - where they show little to no resemblance to free nouns with similar meanings. Compare the lexical suffixes and free nouns of Northern Straits Saanich written in the Saanich orthography and in Americanist notation:

Lexical Suffix			Noun		
-o,	-aʔ	"person"	, ełtálṉew̱	ʔəɬtelŋəxʷ	"person"
-nát	-net	"day"	sȼićel	skʷičəl	"day"
-sen	-sən	"foot, lower leg"	sxene,	sx̣ənəʔ	"foot, lower leg"
-áwtw̱	-ew̕txʷ	"building, house, campsite"	, á,leṉ	ʔeʔləŋ	"house"

Some linguists have claimed that these lexical suffixes provide only adverbial or adjectival notions to verbs. Other linguists disagree, arguing that they may additionally be syntactic arguments just as free nouns are and, thus, equating lexical suffixes with incorporated nouns. Gerdts (2003) gives examples of lexical suffixes in the Halkomelem language (the word order here is verb–subject–object):

		VERB	SUBJ	OBJ
(1)	niʔ	šak’ʷ-ət-əs	łə słeniʔ	łə qeq
	"the woman washed the baby"			
		VERB+LEX.SUFF	SUBJ	
(2)	niʔ	šk’ʷ-əyəł	łə słeniʔ	
	"the woman baby-washed"			

In sentence (1), the verb "wash" is šak’ʷətəs where šak’ʷ- is the root and -ət and -əs are inflectional suffixes. The subject "the woman" is łə słeniʔ and the object "the baby" is łə qeq. In this sentence, "the baby" is a free noun. (The niʔ here is an auxiliary, which can be ignored for explanatory purposes.)

In sentence (2), "baby" does not appear as a free noun. Instead it appears as the lexical suffix -əyəł which is affixed to the verb root šk’ʷ- (which has changed slightly in pronunciation, but this can also be ignored here). The lexical suffix is neither "the baby" (definite) nor "a baby" (indefinite); such referential changes are routine with incorporated nouns.

== Orthographic affixes ==
In orthography, the terms for affixes may be used for the smaller elements of conjunct characters. For example, Maya glyphs are generally compounds of a main sign and smaller affixes joined at its margins. These are called prefixes, superfixes, postfixes, and subfixes according to their position to the left, on top, to the right, or at the bottom of the main glyph. A small glyph placed inside another is called an infix. Similar terminology is found with the conjunct consonants of the Indic alphabets. For example, the Tibetan alphabet utilizes prefix, suffix, superfix, and subfix consonant letters.

== See also ==
- Agglutination – Process of word formation by combining morphemes of singular meaning
- Augmentative – Linguistic morphological form
- Binary prefix – Prefix indicating a power of two
- Clitic – Word that is only pronounceable in combination with another word
- Combining form – Compound words composed from Latin or ancient Greek
- Concatenation – Joining of strings in a programming language
- Diminutive – Word modified to convey a slighter degree
- English prefixes – English affixes added before a word
- Family name affixes
- Internet-related prefixes – Internet-denoting grammatical prefixes
- Marker (linguistics) – Free or bound morpheme
- Morphological derivation – Forming a new word on the basis of an existing one
- Separable affix – Verb with a prefix which separates from the core verb in certain positions in a sentence
- SI prefix – Order of magnitude indicator
- Stemming – Process of reducing words to word stems
- Unpaired word – Word that would appear to have a related word but does not
- Word formation – Creation of new lexemes or the process of changing words

== Bibliography ==
- Gerdts, Donna B. (2003). "The morphosyntax of Halkomelem lexical suffixes". International Journal of American Linguistics. 69 (4): 345–356. doi:10.1086/382736. S2CID 143721330.
- Montler, Timothy. (1986). An outline of the morphology and phonology of Saanich, North Straits Salish. Occasional Papers in Linguistics (No. 4). Missoula, MT: University of Montana Linguistics Laboratory.
- Montler, Timothy. (1991). Saanich, North Straits Salish classified word list. Canadian Ethnology service paper (No. 119); Mercury series. Hull, Quebec: Canadian Museum of Civilization. ISBN 0-660-12908-6
