= Segolate =

Segolates are words in the Hebrew language whose end is of the form CVCVC, where the penultimate vowel receives syllable stress. Such words are called "segolates" because the final unstressed vowel is typically (but not always) segol.

These words evolved from older Semitic words that ended in a complex coda; indeed, when a suffix (other than an absolute plural) is added to a segolate, the original form (or something similar) reappears (cf. kéleḇ "dog" vs. kalbī "my dog").

Examples:

*Ancient	Tiberian		Stem		Meaning
*ʼarṥ	אֶרֶץ, אָרֶץ	ʼéreṣ, ʼā́reṣ	אַרְצ־	ʼarṣ-	earth; land
*ʼurn	אֹרֶן	ʼṓren	אָרְנ־	ʼorn-	pine tree
*baʻl	בַּעַל, בָּעַל	báʻal, bā́ʻal	בַּעֲל־	baʻăl-	husband
*zarʻ	זֶרַע, זָרַע	zéraʻ, zā́raʻ	זַרְע־	zarʻ-	seed
*yayn	יַיִן, יָיִן	yáyin, yā́yin	יֵינ־	yên-	wine
*milḥ	מֶלַח	mélaḥ	מִלְח־	milḥ-	salt
*malk	מֶלֶך	méleḵ	מַלְכּ־	malk-	king
*kalb	כֶּלֶב, כָּלֶב	kéleḇ, kā́leḇ	כַּלְבּ־	kalb-	dog
*laḥy	לֶחִי, לְחִי	léḥî, ləḥî	לֶחֱי־	leḥĕy-	cheek; tool jaw
*ʻibr	עֵבֶר	ʻḖḇer	עִבְר־	ʻiḇr-	Eber
*ʻayn	עַיִן, עָיִן	ʻáyin, ʻā́yin	עֵינ־	ʻên-	eye
*ṣidq	צֶדֶק	ṣéḏeq	צִדְק־ (צַדְק־?)	ṣiḏq-	righteousness

The ancient forms like *CawC (such as šawr "bull") almost universally evolved to non-segolate CôC (שׁוֹר šôr), though there are exceptions, such as מָוֶת mā́weṯ "death".

Some segolate words' final syllable ends with a patach rather than a segol, due to the influence of guttural consonants (ה, ע, א, ח) in the final syllable.

Classical Arabic still preserves forms similar to the reconstructed Ancient Hebrew forms, although significantly simplified. Examples include ʼarḍ "earth", kalb "dog", ʻayn "eye", ṣidq "sincerity".

Some modern dialects insert an epenthetic vowel between the final two consonants, similar to what happened in Hebrew.
