= Nonconcatenative morphology =

Type of word formation

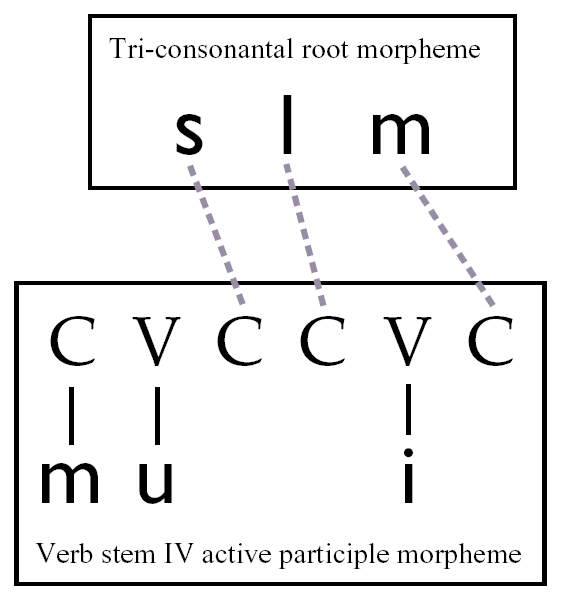
Diagram of one version of the derivation of the Arabic word muslim in autosegmental phonology, with root consonants associating (shown by dotted grey lines).

Nonconcatenative morphology, also called discontinuous morphology and introflection, is a form of word formation and inflection in which the root is modified and which does not involve stringing morphemes together sequentially.

== Types ==
=== Apophony (including Ablaut and Umlaut) ===
In English, for example, while plurals are usually formed by adding the suffix -s, certain words use nonconcatenative processes for their plural forms:

- foot /fʊt/ → feet /fiːt/;

Many irregular verbs form their past tenses, past participles, or both in this manner:

- freeze /ˈfriːz/ → froze /ˈfroʊz/, frozen /ˈfroʊzən/.

This specific form of nonconcatenative morphology is known as base modification or ablaut, a form in which part of the root undergoes a phonological change without necessarily adding new phonological material. In traditional Indo-Europeanist usage, these changes are termed ablaut only when they result from vowel gradations in Proto-Indo-European. An example is the English stem s⌂ng, resulting in the four distinct words: sing-sang-song-sung. An example from German is the stem spr⌂ch "speak", which results in various distinct forms such as spricht-sprechen-sprach-gesprochen-Spruch.

Changes such as foot/feet, on the other hand, which are due to the influence of a since-lost front vowel, are called umlaut or more specifically I-mutation.

Other forms of base modification include lengthening of a vowel, as in Hindi:

- /mər-/ "die" ↔ /maːr-/ "kill"

or change in tone or stress:

- Chalcatongo Mixtec /káʔba/ "filth" ↔ /káʔbá/ "dirty"
- English record /ˈrɛkərd/ (noun) ↔ /rɨˈkɔrd/ "to make a record"

Consonantal apophony, such as the initial-consonant mutations in Celtic languages, also exists.

=== Transfixation ===
Another form of nonconcatenative morphology is known as transfixation, in which vowel and consonant morphemes are interdigitated. For example, depending on the vowels, the Arabic consonantal root k-t-b can have different but semantically related meanings. Thus, [kataba] 'he wrote' and [kitaːb] 'book' both come from the root k-t-b. Words from k-t-b are formed by filling in the vowels, e.g. kitāb "book", kutub "books", kātib "writer", kuttāb "writers", kataba "he wrote", yaktubu "he writes", etc. In the analysis provided by McCarthy's account of nonconcatenative morphology, the consonantal root is assigned to one tier, and the vowel pattern to another. Extensive use of transfixation only occurs in Afro-Asiatic and some Nilo-Saharan languages (such as Lugbara) and is rare or unknown elsewhere.

=== Reduplication ===
Yet another common type of nonconcatenative morphology is reduplication, a process in which all or part of the root is reduplicated. In Sakha, this process is used to form intensified adjectives:

/k̠ɨhɨl/ "red" ↔ /k̠ɨp-k̠ɨhɨl/ "flaming red"

=== Truncation ===
A final type of nonconcatenative morphology is variously referred to as truncation, deletion, or subtraction; the morpheme is sometimes called a disfix. This process removes phonological material from the root. In spoken French, this process can be found in a small subset of plurals (although their spellings follow regular plural-marking rules):

os /ɔs/ "bone" ↔ os /o/ "bones"

œuf /œf/ "egg" ↔ œufs /ø/ "eggs"

bœuf /bœf/ "ox" ↔ bœufs /bø/ "oxen"

== Semitic languages ==
Nonconcatenative morphology is extremely well developed in the Semitic languages in which it forms the basis of virtually all higher-level word formation (as with the example given in the diagram). That is especially pronounced in Arabic, which also uses it to form approximately 41% of plurals in what is often called the broken plural.

== See also ==
- Autosegmental phonology
- Apophony
- Transfix
- Disfix
