= Qal (linguistics) =

Hebrew verb form

In Hebrew grammar, the qal (קַל "light; easy, simple") is the simple paradigm and simplest stem formation of the verb. Qal is the conjugation or binyan in which most verbs in Hebrew dictionaries appear. In the tradition of the other binyanim, it is also called the pa'al (פָּעַל), after its dictionary form for the verb meaning "to do; to make; to operate."

The Classical Hebrew verb conjugates according to person and number in two finite tenses, the perfect and the imperfect. Both of these can then be modified by means of prefixes and suffixes to create other "actions" of the verb. This is not exactly parallel to any categories of grammatical voice or mood in the Indo-European languages, but can produce similar results. So the niphal is effectively a passive, the piel is an emphatic form and the hithpael has a middle or reflexive force. The qal is any form of the finite verb paradigm which is not so modified.

For example, in Genesis 16:2, "So Sarai said to Abram" the Hebrew is "וַתֹּ֨אמֶר שָׂרַ֜י אֶל־אַבְרָ֗ם" the word וַתֹּאמֶר ("vatómer", meaning "and-she-said") is in the qal form as a conjugation of אָמַר.
