= Niphal =

Niphal is the name given to one of the seven major verb stems called בִּנְיָנִים (/binjaˈnim/ binyanim, "constructions") in biblical Hebrew. The designation Niphal comes from the form niph‘al for the verb pa‘al, "to do". The nun (נ) prefix is characteristic of the perfect conjugation, as well as of the participle. In the imperfect conjugation, the nun is (where possible) assimilated into the first root consonant and appears as a dagesh forte. In the imperative and infinitive construct, the prefix is a he (ה) instead of a nun. The infinitive absolute may be prefixed by either the nun or the he.

The Niphal stem usually denotes the incomplete passive or the reflexive voice. However, some verbs, such as nacham (meaning "to repent" in the Niphal), may be better translated with the active voice.

== See also ==
- Modern Hebrew verbs
