= Modern Hebrew verbs =

Verb conjugation in Modern Hebrew grammar

In Hebrew, verbs, which take the form of derived stems, are conjugated to reflect their tense and mood, as well as to agree with their subjects in gender, number, and person. Each verb has an inherent voice, though a verb in one voice typically has counterparts in other voices. This article deals mostly with Modern Hebrew, but to some extent, the information shown here applies to Biblical Hebrew as well.

== Verb classification ==
=== Roots ===
Verbs in Hebrew, like nouns, adjectives, and adverbs, are formed and declined by altering a (usually) three-letter stem, known as a shoresh (שורש transl. root). Vowels are added between or before these three consonants in a pattern to form a related meaning between different roots. For instance, shamar (שמר) "(he) kept / guarded" and katav (כתב) "(he) wrote" both add the vowel "a" in between the first and second consonants and second and third consonants to indicate the past tense "he" form. A similar formation can be found in English strong verbs with write-wrote-written and drive-drove-driven sharing root consonants despite differing vowels and meanings.

Hebrew verbs are further divided into strong roots (regular verbs, with occasional and predictable consonant irregularities), weak roots (predictable verbs irregular by vowel), and wholly irregular verbs.

A root that changes the vowel used in a given pattern is considered a weak stem. These are further divided into guttural (containing alef, hey, het, ayin anywhere, or resh as the second root), hollow (containing vav or yud anywhere, or hey as the final root), and repeating roots (beginning with nun or ending with two of the same consonant); based on exact irregularities. Weak verbs are detailed further below:

==== Guttural weak roots ====
Guttural roots contain a guttural consonant (such as alef (א), hei (ה), het (ח), or ayin (ע) in any position; or resh (ר) as the second letter). Hei (ה) as the third letter is usually a hollow root marker due to being a vowel spelling rather than one of any consonant, and is only considered a guttural root in the third position if historically pronounced. Alef (א) root-initially and root-finally takes on a somewhat divergent conjugation similar to that of hollow roots, but is usually identical to other gutturals. Of the three classes of weak roots, guttural roots are the most common.

==== Vowel weak roots ====
Roots containing a vav (ו) or yud (י) anywhere mark a historical vowel. Hey (ה) word-finally usually marks a final vowel for the same reason, and shares similar irregularities.

==== Repeating weak roots ====
Roots containing two of the same letter or a nun (נ) in first position are considered repeating roots. Nun (נ) before a consonant doubles it or prevents bais (בּ), kaf (כּ), and pey (פּ) from becoming vais, chaf, and fey in word-medial position. Doubling consonants also changes the quality of the preceding vowel. However, doubling a consonant that doesn't change it outright (gemination) is obsolete in Modern Hebrew, and the irregularities usually affect the vowels.

==== Initial sibilants: metathesis ====
When the initial letter of a shoresh is one of the sibilants zayin (ז), samach (ס), tzadik (צ) or shin (ש), then in hitpa'el there is a phenomenon called metathesis, in which the sibilant trades places with a preceding tav (ת); in addition, the taf (ת) preceding a zayin (ז) changes to a daled (ד) and the taf (ת) preceding a tzadik (צ) changes to a tes (ט). E.g., מִזְדַּקֵּן, הִסְתַּכַּלְנוּ, אֶצְטָרֵף, לְהִשְׁתַּמֵּשׁ.

=== Stems ===
Hebrew verbs are inflected according to specific patterns, derived stems, called forms or בִּנְיָנִים (/binjaˈnim/ binyanim, "constructions"); where vowel patterns (משקלים /miʃkaˈlim/ mishkalim, "weights"), affixes are put into the (usually) three-letter roots from which the vast majority of Hebrew words are made.

There are seven basic conjugations, as well as some irregular verbs coming from otherwise-obsolete constructions. The traditional demonstration root is פ.ע.ל (p-`-l), which has the basic meaning of "(He) acted". The dictionary form (קַל Kal "light; easy, simple" in hebrew) for this root is Pa'al. The conjugations for this root are as follows:

root: פעל
active			reflexive	passive
פָּעַל paˈal	פִּעֵל piˈel	הִפְעִיל hifˈil	הִתְפַּעֵל hitpaˈel	הֻפְעַל hufˈal	פֻּעַל puˈal	נִפְעַל nifˈal
			causative
		intensive
	simple

This chart's menorah-like shape is sometimes invoked in teaching the binyanim to help students remember the main ideas about the verb forms: (1) which binyanim are active voice (left side) vs. passive voice (right side), and (2) which binyanim are simple (outer-most menorah branches), intensive (second-outer-most), causative (third-outer-most), and reflexive (center). Note that some binyanim have more meanings than the ones shown here, as well as obsolete and rare ones being left off entirely.

In Early Modern Hebrew, the verb paradigm nitpa'el (or nispa'el in Ashkenazi pronunciation) was much more common than hitpa'el, but it was ultimately marginalized because its meanings were a subset of hitpa'el. Shira Wigderson has postulated that the early popularity of nitpa'el was due to the influence of Yiddish; as the influence of Yiddish waned over time, the popularity of nitpa'el declined.

== Regular conjugation ==
=== Present tense ===
A verb in the present tense (הוֹוֶה /(h)oˈve/ hove) agrees with its subject in gender (masculine or feminine) and number (singular or plural), so each verb has four present-tense forms. The present tense does not inflect by person because its use as a present tense is a relatively recent trend, as this form was originally used only as the present participle.

Earlier forms of the Hebrew language did not have strictly defined past, present, or future tenses, but merely perfective and imperfective aspects, with past, present, or future connotation depending on context. Later the perfective and imperfective aspects were explicitly refashioned as the past and future tenses, respectively, with the present participle also becoming the present tense. This also happened to the Aramaic language around the same time, and later in some varieties of Arabic (such as Egyptian Arabic).

In these tables, every stressed syllable will be capitalized, except in monosyllabic words. Ayin will be represented by `, and aleph by ´, whenever pronounced.

Present tense patterns
Root Type	Singular		Plural	
Root Type	Masculine (no suffix)	Feminine ־ת : -et / ־ה : -a	Masculine ־ים : -im	Feminine ־ות : -ot
Pa'al
Strong	1o2e3	1o2e3et	1o23im	1o23ot
Guttural 2	1o2e3	1o2e3et	1o2a3im	1o2a3ot
Guttural 3	1o2ea3	1o2a3at	1o23im	1o23ot
Vowel 2	1a3	1a3a	1a3im	1a3ot
Vowel 3	1o2e	1o2a	1o2im	1o2ot
Alef 3	1o2e´	1o2e´t	1o2´im	1o2´ot
Repeating	1a2	1a22a	1a22im	1a22ot
Pi'el
Strong	me1a22e3	me1a22e3et	me1a223im	me1a223ot
Guttural 2	me1a2e3	me1a2e3et	me1a2a3im	me1a2a3ot
Guttural 3	me1a22ea3	me1a22a3at	me1a223im	me1a223ot
Vowel 3	me1a22e	me1a22a	me1a22im	me1a22ot
Alef 3	me1a22e´	me1a22e´t	me1a22´im	me1a22´ot
Polel	me1o3e3	me1o3e3et	me1o3e3im	me1o3e3ot
Hif'il
Strong	ma12i3	ma12i3a	ma12i3im	ma12i3ot
Guttural 1	ma1a2i3	ma1a2i3a	ma1a2i3im	ma1a2i3ot
Guttural 3	ma12ia3	ma12i3a	ma12i3im	ma12i3ot
Vowel 1	mo2i3	mo2i3a	mo2i3im	mo2i3ot
Vowel 2	me1i3	me1i3a	me1i3im	me1i3ot
Vowel 3	ma12e	ma12a	ma12im	ma12ot
Nun 1	ma22i3	ma22i3a	ma22i3im	ma22i3ot
Nun 1 & Guttural 3	ma22ia3	ma22i3a	ma22i3im	ma22i3ot
Repeating	me1e2	me1i22a	me1i22im	me1i22ot
Hitpa'el
Strong	mit1a22e3	mit1a22e3et	mit1a223im	mit1a223ot
Zayin 1	mizda22e3	mizda22e3et	mizda223im	mizda223ot
Samekh/Sin 1	mista22e3	mista22e3et	mista223im	mista223ot
Tsade 1	mitzṭa22e3	mitzṭa22e3et	mitzṭa223im	mitzṭa223ot
Shin 1	mišta22e3	mišta22e3et	mišta223im	mišta223ot
Guttural 2	mit1a2e3	mit1a2e3et	mit1a2a3im	mit1a2a3ot
Guttural 3	mit1a22ea3	mit1a22a3at	mit1a223im	mit1a223ot
Vowel 3	mit1a22e	mit1a22a	mit1a22im	mit1a22ot
Alef 3	mit1a22e´	mit1a22´et	mit1a22´im	mit1a22´ot
Hitpolel	mit1o3e3	mit1o3e3et	mit1o3e3im	mit1o3e3ot
Nif'al
Strong	ni12a3	ni12e3et	ni12a3im	ni12a3ot
Guttural 1	ne1e2a3	ne1e2e3et	ne1e2a3im	ne1e2a3ot
Guttural 3	ni12a3	ni12a3at	ni12a3im	ni12a3ot
Vowel 1	no2a3	no2e3et	no2a3im	no2a3ot
Vowel 2	na1a3	ne1a3a	ne1a3im	ne1a3ot
Vowel 3	ni12e	ni12et	ni12im	ni12ot
Alef 3	ni12a´	ni12e´t	ni12a´im	ni12a´ot
Nun 1	ni22a3	ni22e3et	ni22a3im	ni22a3ot
Repeating	na1a2	ne1a22a	ne1a22im	ne1a22ot

Present tense examples
Root Type	Singular		Plural		Meaning
Root Type	Masculine	Feminine	Masculine	Feminine	Meaning
Pa'al
Strong	כּוֹתֵב	כּוֹתֶבֶת	כּוֹתְבִים	כּוֹתְבוֹת	write(s)
Strong	koTEV	koTEvet	kotVIM	kotVOT	write(s)
Guttural 2	בּוֹחֵר	בּוֹחֶרֶת	בּוֹחֲרִים	בּוֹחֲרוֹת	choose(s)
Guttural 2	boCHER	boCHEret	bochaRIM	bochaROT	choose(s)
Guttural 3	בּוֹלֵעַ	בּוֹלַעַת	בּוֹלְעִים	בּוֹלעוֹת	swallow(s)
Guttural 3	boLEA`	boLA`at	bol`IM	bol`OT	swallow(s)
Vowel 2	דָּן	דָּנָה	דָּנִים	דָּנוֹת	discuss(es)
Vowel 2	dan	daNA	daNIM	daNOT	discuss(es)
Vowel 3	שׁוֹתֶה	שׁוֹתָה	שׁוֹתִים	שׁוֹתוֹת	drink(s)
Vowel 3	shoTE	shoTA	shoTIM	shoTOT	drink(s)
Alef 3	מוֹצֵא	מוֹצֵאת	מוֹצְאִים	מוֹצְאוֹת	find(s)
Alef 3	moTSE	moTSET	mots´IM	mots´OT	find(s)
Repeating	סָב	סַבָּה	סַבִּים	סַבּוֹת	spin(s)
Repeating	sav	saBA	saBIM	saBOT	spin(s)
Pi'el
Strong	מְנַדֵּב	מְנַדֶּבֶת	מְנַדְּבִים	מְנַדְּבוֹת	contribute(s)
Strong	menaDEV	menaDEvet	menadVIM	menadVOT	contribute(s)
Guttural 2	מְבָאֵס	מְבָאֶסֶת	מְבַאֲסִים	מְבַאֲסוֹת	make(s) upset
Guttural 2	meva´ES	meva´Eset	meva´aSIM	meva´aSOT	make(s) upset
Guttural 3	מְשַׁגֵּעַ	מְשַׁגַּעַת	מְשַׁגְּעִים	מְשַׁגְּעוֹת	drive(s) crazy
Guttural 3	meshaGEA`	meshaGA`at	meshag`IM	meshag`OT	drive(s) crazy
Vowel 3	מְנַסֶּה	מְנַסָּה	מְנַסִּים	מְנַסּוֹת	try(s)
Vowel 3	menaSE	menaSA	menaSIM	menaSOT	try(s)
Alef 3	מְבַטֵּא	מְבַטֵּאת	מְבַטְּאִים	מְבַטְּאוֹת	pronounce(s), state(s)
Alef 3	mevaTE	mevaTET	mevat´IM	mevat´OT	pronounce(s), state(s)
Po'el	מרומם/ מְרוֹמֵם	מרוממת/ מְרוֹמֶמֶת	מרוממים/ מְרוֹמְמִים	מרוממות/ מְרוֹמְמוֹת	raise(s)
Po'el	meroMEM	meroMEmet	meromeMIM	meromeMOT	raise(s)
Hif'il
Strong	מַזְמִין	מַזְמִינָה	מַזְמִינִים	מַזְמִינוֹת	invite(s), order(s)
Strong	mazMIN	mazmiNA	mazmiNIM	mazmiNOT	invite(s), order(s)
Guttural 1	מַעֲדִיף	מַעֲדִיפָה	מַעֲדִפִים	מַעֲדִיפוֹת	prefer(s)
Guttural 1	ma`aDIF	ma`adiFA	ma`adiFIM	ma`adiFOT	prefer(s)
Guttural 3	מַפְתִּיעַ	מַפְתִּיעָה	מַפְתִּיעִים	מַפְתִּיעוֹת	surprise(s)
Guttural 3	maftIA`	mafti`A	mafti`IM	mafti`OT	surprise(s)
Vowel 1	מוֹבִיל	מוֹבִילָה	מוֹבִילִים	מוֹבִילוֹת	lead(s)
Vowel 1	moVIL	moviLA	moviLIM	moviLOT	lead(s)
Vowel 2	מֵבִין	מְבִינָה	מְבִינִים	מְבִינוֹת	understand(s)
Vowel 2	meVIN	meviNA	meviNIM	meviNOT	understand(s)
Vowel 3	מַפְנֶה	מַפְנָה	מַפְנִים	מַפְנוֹת	turn(s)
Vowel 3	mafNE	mafNA	mafNIM	mafNOT	turn(s)
Nun 1	מַכִּיר	מַכִּירָה	מַכִּירִים	מַכִּירוֹת	know(s) [a person]
Nun 1	maKIR	makiRA	makiRIM	makiROT	know(s) [a person]
Repeating	מֵסֵב	מְסִבָּה	מְסִיבִּים	מְסִבּוֹת	change(s)
Repeating	meSEV	mesiBA	mesiBIM	mesiBOT	change(s)
Hitpa'el
Strong	מִתְנַדֵּב	מִתְנַדֶּבֶת	מִתְנַדְּבִים	מִתְנַדְּבוֹת	volunteer(s)
Strong	mitnaDEV	mitnaDEvet	mitnadVIM	mitnadVOT	volunteer(s)
Guttural 2	מִתְבָּאֵס	מִתְבָּאֶסֶת	מִתְבַּאֲסִים	מִתְבַּאֲסוֹת	is/are upset
Guttural 2	mitba´ES	mitba´Eset	mitba´aSIM	mitba´aSOT	is/are upset
Guttural 3	מִשְׁתַּגֵּעַ	מִשְׁתַּגַּעַת	מִשְׁתַּגְּעִים	מִשְׁתַּגְּעוֹת	go(es) crazy
Guttural 3	mishtaGEA`	mishtaGA`at	mishtag`IM	mishtag`OT	go(es) crazy
Vowel 3	מִתְנַסֶּה	מִתְנַסָּה	מִתְנַסִּים	מִתְנַסּוֹת	experience(s)
Vowel 3	mitnaSE	mitnaSA	mitnaSIM	mitnaSOT	experience(s)
Alef 3	מִתְבַּטֵּא	מִתְבַּטֵּאת	מִתְבַּטְּאִים	מִתְבַּטְּאוֹת	speak(s) out
Alef 3	mitbaTE	mitbaTET	mitbat´IM	mitbat´OT	speak(s) out
Hitpo'el	מִתְרוֹמֵם	מִתְרוֹמֶמֶת	מִתְרוֹמְמִים	מִתְרוֹמְמוֹת	rise(s)
Hitpo'el	mitroMEM	mitroMEmet	mitromeMIM	mitromeMOT	rise(s)
Zayin 1	מִזְדַּקֵּן /	מִזְדַּקֶּנֶת	מִזְדַּקְּנִים	מִזְדַּקְּנוֹת	ages
Zayin 1	mizDaken	mizDAkeneth	mizDAknim	mizDAknoth	ages
Samekh/Sin 1	מִסְתַּכֵּל /	מִסְתַּכֶּלֶת	מִסְתַּכְּלִים	מִסְתַּכְּלוֹת	looks
Samekh/Sin 1	misTAkel	misTAkeleth	misTAkelim	misTAkloth	looks
Tsade 1	מִצְטַעֵר /	מִצְטַעֶרֶת	מִצְטַעֲרִים	מִצְטַעֲרוֹת	regrets
Tsade 1	mitzTA'er	mitzTA'ereth	mitzTA'arim	mitzTA'aroth	regrets
Shin 1	מִשְׁתַּדֵּל /	מִשְׁתַּדֶּלֶת	מִשְׁתַּדְּלִים	מִשְׁתַּדְּלוֹת	try/tries
Shin 1	mishTAdel	mishTAdeleth	mishTAdlim	mishTAdloth	try/tries
Nif'al
Strong	נִכְתָּב	נִכְתֶּבֶת	נִכְתָּבִים	נִכְתָּבוֹת	is/are written
Strong	nikhTAV	nikhTEvet	nikhtaVIM	nikhtaVOT	is/are written
Guttural 1	נֶאֱכָל	נֶאֱכֶלֶת	נֶאֱכָלִים	נֶאֱכָלוֹת	is/are eaten
Guttural 1	ne´eKHAL	ne´eKHElet	ne´ekhaLIM	ne´ekhaLOT	is/are eaten
Guttural 3	נבלע/ נִבְלַע	נִבְלַעַת	נִבְלָעִים	נִבְלָעוֹת	is/are swallowed
Guttural 3	nivLA`	nivLA`at	nivla`IM	nivla`OT	is/are swallowed
Vowel 1	נוֹלָד	לוֹלֶדֶת	נוֹלָדִים	נוֹלָדוֹת	is/are born
Vowel 1	noLAD	noLEdet	nolaDIM	nolaDOT	is/are born
Vowel 2	נָדוֹן	נְדוֹנָה	נְדוֹנִים	נְדוֹנוֹת	is/are discussed
Vowel 2	naDON	nedoNA	nedoNIM	nedoNOT	is/are discussed
Vowel 3	נִשְׁתֶּה	נִשְׁתֵּית	נִשְׁתִּים	נִשְׁתּוֹת	is/are drunk
Vowel 3	nishTE	nishTET	nishTIM	nishTOT	is/are drunk
Alef 3	נִמְצָא	נִמְצֵאת	נִמְצָאִים	נִמְצָאוֹת	is/are [at]
Alef 3	nimTSA	nimTSET	nimtsa´IM	nimtsa´OT	is/are [at]
Nun 1	נישך/ נִשָּׁך	נישכת/ נִשֶּׁכֶת	נישכים/ נִשָּׁכִים	נישכות/ נִשָּׁכוֹת	is/are bitten
Nun 1	niSHAKH	niSHEkhet	nishaKHIM	nishaKHOT	is/are bitten
Repeating	נָסָב	נְסַבָּה	נְסַבִּים	נְסַבּוֹת	is/are surrounding
Repeating	naSAV	nesaBA	nesaBIM	nesaBOT	is/are surrounding

=== Past tense ===
A verb in the past tense (עָבָר /(ʔ)aˈvaʁ/ 'avar) agrees with its subject in person (first, second, or third), number, and in the second-person and third-person singular, gender. The corresponding subject pronouns are not necessarily used in conjunction.

Conjugation in the past tense is done by adding a suffix (universal across binyanim) to a binyan-specific root, so that <שמר> "guarded" adds <־תי> "I" to become <שמרתי> "I guarded". The root changes depending on whether the suffix begins with a vowel or a consonant. The third person masculine singular pronoun (he/it) does not take a suffix and uses the plain stem; this is also the dictionary form for any given verb. There also used to be past-tense object suffixes, which came after the subject suffix, but these are obsolete.

Past tense subject suffixes
Person	Singular		Plural	
Person	Masculine	Feminine	Masculine	Feminine
1st person	־תִּי		־נוּ	
1st person	-ti		-nu	
2nd person	־תָּ	־תְּ	־תֶּם	־תֶּן
2nd person	-ta	-t	-tem	ten
3rd person	no suffix	־ה/ -ָה	־וּ	
3rd person	no suffix	-a	-u	

Past tense patterns
Stem	Suffix		
Stem	None	Vowel	Consonant
Pa'al (acted)
Strong	1a2a3	1a23-	1a2a3-
Guttural 2	1a2a3	1a2a3-	1a2a3-
Vowel 2	1a3	1a3-	1a3-
Vowel 3	1a2a	1a2-	1a2i-
Repeating	1a2	1a22-	1a22o-
Pi'el (caused action)
Strong	1i22e3	1i223-	1i22a3-
Guttural 3	1i22a3	1i223-	1i22a3-
Vowel 3	1i22a	1i22-	1i22i-
Alef/'Ayin 2	1e2e3	1e2a3-	1e2a3-
Hey/Chet 2	1i2e3	1i2a3-	1i2a3-
Resh 2	1ere3	1er3-	1era3-
Alef 3	1i22e´	1i22´-	1i22e´-
Po'el	1o2e3	1o23-	1o2a3-
Hif'il (caused action)
Strong	hi12i3	hi12i3-	hi12a3-
Guttural 1	he1(e)2i3	he1(e)2i3-	he1(e)2a3-
Vowel 1	ho2i3	ho2i3-	ho2a3-
Vowel 2	he1i3	he1i3-	he1a3-
Vowel 3	hi12a	hi12-	hi12ey-
Alef 3	hi12i´	hi12i´-	hi12e´-
Nun 1	hi22i3	hi22i3-	hi22a3-
Repeating	he1e2	he1e22-	ha1i22o-
Hitpa'el (caused to act)
Strong	hit1a22e3	hit1a223-	hit1a22a3-
Zayin 1	hizda22e3	hizda22e3	hizda22e3-
Samekh/Sin 1	hista22e3	hista22e3	hista22e3-
Tsade 1	hitzṭa22e3	hitzṭa22e3	hitzṭa22e3-
Shin 1	hišta22e3	hišta22e3	hištda22e3-
Guttural 2	hit1a2e3	hit1a2a3-	hit1a2a3-
Guttural 3	hit1a22ea3	hit1a223-	hit1a22a3-
Vowel 3	hit1a22e	hit1a22-	hit1a22ey-
Alef 3	hit1a22e´	hit1a22´-	hit1a22a´-
Hitpo'el	hit1o2e3	hit1o23-	hit1o2a3-
Nif'al (caused to act)
Strong	ni12a3	ni12e3-	ni12a3-
Guttural 1	ne1(e)2a3	ne1(e)23-	ne1(e)2a3-
Guttural 2	ni12a3	ni12a3-	ni12a3-
Vowel 1	no2a3	no23-	no2a3-
Vowel 2	na1o3	na1o3-	ne1u3-
Vowel 3	ni12a	ni12-	ni12ey-
Alef 3	ni12a´	ni12e´-	ni12´-
Nun 1	ni22a3	ni223-	ni22a3-
Repeating	na1a2	na1a3-	ne1a22o-
Pu'al
Strong	1u22a3	1u223-	1u22a3-
Guttural 2	1o2a3	1o2a3-	1o2a3-
Vowel 3	1u22a	1u22-	1u22e-
Alef 3	1u22a´	1u22´-	1u22e-
Po'al	1o22a3	1o223-	1o22a3-
Huf'al
Strong	hu12a3	hu12e3-	hu12a3-
Guttural 1	ho1o2a3	ho1o23-	ho1o2a3-
Guttural 2	hu12a3	hu12a3-	hu12a3-
Nun 1	hu22a3	hu223-	hu22a3-
Repeating	hu1a2	hu1a22-	hu1a2-
Vowel 1, 2	hu2a3	hu23-	hu2a3-
Vowel 3	hu12a	hu12-	hu12e-

Past tense examples
Stem	1st person		2nd person				3rd person			Meaning
Stem	Singular	Plural	Singular		Plural		Singular		Plural	Meaning
Stem	Singular	Plural	Masculine	Feminine	Masculine	Feminine	Masculine	Feminine	Plural	Meaning
Pa'al
Strong	כָּתַבְתִּי	כָּתַבְנוּ	כָּתַבְתָּ	כָּתַבְתְּ	כְּתַבְתֶּם	כְּתַבְתֶּן	כָּתַב	כָּתְבָה	כָּתְבוּ	wrote
Strong	kaTAVti	kaTAVnu	kaTAVta	kaTAVT	ktavTEM	ktavTEN	kaTAV	katVA	katVU	wrote
Guttural 2	בָּחַרְתִּי	בָּחַרְנוּ	בָּחַרְתָּ	בָּחַרְתְּ	בְּחַרְתֶּם	בְּחַרְתֶּן	בָּחַר	בָּחֲרָה	בָּחֲרוּ	chose
Guttural 2	baCHARti	baCHARnu	baCHARta	baCHART	bcharTEM	bcharTEN	baCHAR	bachaRA	bachaRU	chose
Vowel 2	דַּנְתִּי	דַּנּוּ	דַּנְתָּ	דַּנְתְּ	דַּנְתֶּם	דַּנְתֶּן	דָּן	דָּנָה	דָּנוּ	discussed
Vowel 2	DANti	DANnu	DANta	DANT	danTEM	danTEN	dan	DAna	DAnu	discussed
Vowel 3	שָׁתִיתִי	שָׁתִינוּ	שָׁתִיתָ	שָׁתִיתְ	שְׁתִיתֶם	שְׁתִיתֶן	שָׁתָה	שָׁתְתָה	שָׁתוּ	drank
Vowel 3	shaTIti	shaTInu	shaTIta	shaTIT	shtiTEM	shtiTEN	shaTA	shateTA	shaTU	drank
Repeating	סַבּוֹתִי	סַבּוֹנוּ	סַבּוֹתָ	סַבּוֹתְ	סַבּוֹתֶם	סַבּוֹתֶן	סב/	סַבָּה	סַבּוּ	spun
Repeating	saBOti (saVAVti)	saBOnu (saVAVnu)	saBOta (saVAVta)	saBOT (saVAVT)	saboTEM (svavTEM)	saboTEN (svavTEN)	sav (saVAV)	SAba (saveVA)	SAbu (saveVU)	spun
Pi'el
Strong	נידבתי/ נִדַּבְתִּי	נידבנו/ נִדַּבְנוּ	נידבת/ נִדַּבְתָּ	נידבת/ נִדַּבְתְּ	נידבתם/ נִדַּבְתֶּם	נידבתן/ נִדַּבְתֶּן	נידב/ נִדֵּב	נידבה/ נִדְּבָה	נידבו/ נִדְּבוּ	contributed
Strong	niDAVti	niDAVnu	niDAVta	niDAVT	nidavTEM	nidavTEN	niDEV	nidVA	nidVU	contributed
Alef/ 'Ayin 2	בֵּאַסְתִּי	בֵּאַסְנוּ	בֵּאַסְתָּ	בֵּאַסְתְּ	בֵּאַסְתֶּם	בֵּאַסְתֶּן	בֵּאֵס	בֵּאֲסָה	בֵּאֲסוּ	made upset
Alef/ 'Ayin 2	be´ASti	be´ASnu	be´ASta	be´AST	be´asTEM	be´asTEN	be´ES	be´aSA	be´aSU	made upset
Hey/ Chet 2	שיחקתי/ שִׂחַקְתִּי	שיחקנו/ שִׂחַקְנוּ	שיחקת/ שִׂחַקְתָּ	שיחקת/ שִׂחַקְתְּ	שיחקתם/ שִׂחַקְתֶּם	שיחקתן/ שִׂחַקְתֶּן	שיחק/ שִׂחֵק	שיחקה/ שִׂחֲקָה	שיחקו/ שִׂחֲקוּ	played
Hey/ Chet 2	siCHAKti	siCHAKnu	siCHAKta	siCHAKT	sichakTEM	sichakTEN	siCHEK	sichaKA	sichaKU	played
Resh 2	סירבתי/ סֵרַבְתִּי	סירבנו/ סֵרַבְנוּ	סירבת/ סֵרַבְתָּ	סירבת/ סֵרַבְתְּ	סירבתם/ סֵרַבְתֶּם	סירבתן/ סֵרַבְתֶּן	סירב/ סֵרֵב	סירבה/ סֵרְבָה	סירבו/ סֵרְבוּ	refused
Resh 2	seRAVti	seRAVnu	seRAVta	seRAVT	seravTEM	seravTEN	seREV	serVA	serVU	refused
Alef 3	ביטאתי/ בִּטֵּאתִי	ביטאנו/ בִּטֵּאנוּ	ביטאת/ בִּטֵּאתָ	ביטאת/ בִּטֵּאת	ביטאתם/ בִּטֵּאתֶם	ביטאתן/ בִּטֵּאתֶן	ביטא/ בִּטֵּא	ביטאה/ בִּטְּאָה	ביטאו/ בִּטְּאוּ	pronounced, stated
Alef 3	biTEti	biTEnu	biTEta	biTET	biteTEM	biteTEN	biTE	bit´A	bit´U	pronounced, stated
Guttural 3	שִׁגַּעְתִּי	שִׁגַּעְנוּ	שִׁגַּעְתָּ	שִׁגַּעְתְּ	שִׁגַּעְתֶּם	שִׁגַּעְתֶּן	שִׁגֵּעַ	שִׁגְּעָה	שִׁגְּעוּ	drove crazy
Guttural 3	shiGA`ti	shiGA`nu	shiGA`ta	shiGA`t	shiga`TEM	shiga`TEN	shiGEA`	shig`A	shig`U	drove crazy
Vowel 3	ניסיתי/ נִסִּיתִי	ניסינו/ נִסִּינוּ	ניסית/ נִסִּיתָ	ניסית/ נִסִּית	ניסיתם/ נִסִּיתֶם	ניסיתן/ נִסִּיתֶן	ניסה/ נִסָּה	ניסתה/ נִסְּתָּה	ניסו/ נִסּוּ	tried
Vowel 3	niSIti	niSInu	niSIta	niSIT	nisiTEM	nisiTEN	niSA	nisTA	niSU	tried
Po'el	רוֹמַמְתִּי	רוֹמַמְנוּ	רוֹמַמְתָּ	רוֹמַמְתְּ	רוֹמַמְתֶּם	רוֹמַמְתֶּן	רוֹמֵם	רוֹמְמָה	רוֹמְמוּ	raised
Po'el	roMAMti	roNAMnu	roMAMta	roMAMT	romamTEM	romamTEN	roMEM	romeMA	romeMU	raised
Hif'il
Strong	הִזְמַנְתִּי	הִזְמַנּוּ	הִזְמַנְתָּ	הִזְמַנְתְּ	הִזְמַנְתֶּם	הִזְמַנְתֶּן	הִזְמִין	הִזְמִינָה	הִזְמִינוּ	was/were invited, ordered
Strong	hizMANti	hizMANnu	hizMANta	hizMANT	hizmanTEM	hizmanTEN	hizMIN	hizMIna	hizMInu	was/were invited, ordered
Guttural 1	הֶעֱדַפְתִּי	הֶעֱדַפְנוּ	הֶעֱדַפְתָּ	הֶעֱדַפְתְּ	הֶעֱדַפְתֶּם	הֶעֱדַפְתֶּן	הֶעֱדִיף	הֶעֱדִיפָה	הֶעֱדִיפוּ	preferred
Guttural 1	he`eDAFti	he`eDAFnu	he`eDAFta	he`eDAFT	he`edafTEM	he`edafTEN	he`eDIF	he`eDIfa	he`eDIfu	preferred
Vowel 1	הוֹבַלְתִּי	הוֹבַלְנוּ	ָהוֹבַלתּ	הוֹבַלְתְּ	הובלתם/ הוֹבַלְתֶּם	הוֹבַלְתֶּן	הוֹבִיל	הוֹבִילָה	הוֹבִילוּ	led
Vowel 1	hoVALti	hoVALnu	hoVALta	hoVALT	hovalTEM	hovalTEN	hoVIL	hoVIla	hoVIlu	led
Vowel 2	הֵבַנְתִּי	הֵבַנּוּ	הֵבַנְתָּ	הֵבַנְתְּ	הֲבַנְתֶּם	הֲבַנְתֶּן	הֵבִין	הֵבִינָה	הֵבִינוּ	understood
Vowel 2	heVANti	heVANnu	heVANta	heVANT	havanTEM	havanTEN	heVIN	heVIna	heVInu	understood
Vowel 3	הִפְנֵיתִי	הִפְנֵינוּ	הִפְנֵיתָ	הִפְנֵית	הִפְנֵיתֶם	הִפְנֵיתֶן	הִפְנָה	הִפְנְתָה	הִפְנוּ	turned
Vowel 3	hifNEti	hifNEnu	hifNEta	hifNET	hifneTEM	hifneTEN	hifNA	hifneTA	hifNU	turned
Alef 3	הִקְפֵּאתִי	הִקפֵּאנוּ	הִקְפֵּאתָ	הִקְפֵּאת	הִקְפֵּאתֶם	הִקְפֵּאתֶן	הקפיא/ הִקְפִּא	הקפיאה/ הִקְפִּאָה	הקפיאו/ הִקְפִּיאוּ	froze
Alef 3	hikPEti	hikPEnu	hikPEta	hikPET	hikpeTEM	hikpeTEN	hikPI	hikPI´a	hikPI´u	froze
Nun 1	הִבַּטְתִּי	הִבַּטְנוּ	הִבַּטְתָּ	הִבַּטְתְּ	הִבַּטְתֶּם	הִבַּטְתֶּן	הִבִּיט	הִבִּיטָה	הִבִּיטוּ	knew [a person], recognized
Nun 1	hiBAteti	hiBATnu	hiBAteta	hiBAtet	hibateTEM	hibateTEN	hiBIT	hiBIta	hiBItu	knew [a person], recognized
Repeating	הסיבותי/ הֲסִבּוֹתִי	הסיבונו/ הֲסִבּוֹנוּ	הסיבות/ הֲסִבּוֹתָ	הסיבות/ הֲסִבּוֹת	הסיבותם/ הֲסִבּוֹתֶם	הסיבותן/ הֲסִבּוֹתֶן	הֵסֵב	הֵסֵבָּה	הֵסֵבּוּ	changed
Repeating	hasiBOti (heSAVti)	hasiBOnu (heSAVnu)	hasiBOta (heSAVta)	hasiBOT (heSAVT)	hasiboTEM (hasavTEM)	hasiboTEN (hasavTEN)	heSEV	heSEba	heSEbu	changed
Hitpa'el
Strong	הִתְנַדַּבְתִּי	הִתְנַדַּבְנוּ	הִתְנַדַּבְתָּ	הִתְנַדַּבְתְּ	הִתְנַדַּבְתֶּם	הִתְנַדַּבְתֶּן	הִתְנַדֵּב	הִתְנַדְּבָה	הִתְנַדְּבוּ	volunteered
Strong	hitnaDAVti	hitnaDAVnu	hitnaDAVta	hitnaDAVT	hitnadavTEM	hitnadavTEN	hitnaDEV	hitnadVA	hitnadVU	volunteered
Guttural 2	הִתְבָּאַסְתִּי	הִתְבָּאַסְנוּ	הִתְבָּאַסְתָּ	הִתְבָּאַסְתְּ	הִתְבָּאַסְתֶּם	הִתְבָּאַסְתֶּן	הִתְבָּאֵס	הִתְבָּאֲסָה	הִתְבָּאֲסוּ	got upset
Guttural 2	hitba´ASti	hitba´ASnu	hitba´ASta	hitba´AST	hitba´asTEM	hitba´asTEN	hitba´ES	hitba´aSA	hitba´aSU	got upset
Guttural 3	הִשְׁתַּגַּעְתִּי	הִשְׁתַּגַּעְנוּ	הִשְׁתַּגַּעְתָּ	הִשְׁתַּגַּעְתְּ	הִשְׁתַּגַּעְתֶּם	הִשְׁתַּגַּעְתֶּן	הִשְׁתַּגֵּעַ	הִשְׁתַּגְּעָה	הִשְׁתַּגְּעוּ	went crazy
Guttural 3	hishtaGA`ti	hishtaGA`nu	hishtaGA`ta	hishtaGA`t	hishtaga`TEM	hishtaga`TEN	hishtaGEA`	hishtag`A	hishtag`U	went crazy
Vowel 3	הִתְנַסֵּיתִי	הִתְנַסֵּינוּ	הִתְנַסֵּיתָ	הִתְנַסֵּית	הִתְנַסֵּיתֶם	הִתְנַסֵּיתֶן	הִתְנַסָּה	הִתְנַסְּתָה	הִתְנַסּוּ	experienced
Vowel 3	hitnaSEti	hitnaSEnu	hitnaSEta	hitnaSET	hitnaseTEM	hitnaseTEN	hitnaSA	hitnasTA	hitnaSU	experienced
Alef 3	הִתְבַּטֵּאתִי	הִתְבַּטֵּאנוּ	התְבַּטֵּאתָ	הִתְבַּטֵּאת	הִתבַּטֵּאתֶם	הִתבַּטֵּאתֶן	הִתְבַּטֵּא	הִתְבַּטְּאָה	הִתְבַּטְּאוּ	spoke out
Alef 3	hitbaTEti	hitbaTEnu	hitbaTEta	hitbaTET	hitbateTEM	hitbateTEN	hitbaTE	hitbat´A	hitbat´U	spoke out
Hitpo'el	הִתְרוֹמַמְתִּי	הִתְרוֹמַמְנוּ	הִתרוֹמַמְתָּ	הִתְרוֹמַמְתְּ	הִתְרוֹמַמְתֶּם	הִתְרוֹמַמְתֶּן	הִתְרוֹמֵם	הִתְרוֹמְמָה	הִתְרוֹמְמוּ	rose
Hitpo'el	hitroMAMti	hitroMAMnu	hitroMANta	hitroMAMT	hitromamTEN	hitromamTEN	hitroMEM	hitromeMA	hitromeMU	rose
Nif'al
Strong	נִכְתַּבְתִּי	נִכְתַּבְנוּ	נִכְתַּבְתָּ	נִכְתַּבְתְּ	נִכְתַּבְתֶּם	נִכְתַּבְתֶּן	נִכְתַּב	נִכְתְּבָה	נִכְתְּבוּ	was/were written
Strong	nikhTAVti	nikhTAVnu	nikhTAVta	nikhTAVT	nikhtavTEM	nikhtavTEN	nikhTAV	nikhteVA	nikhteVU	was/were written
Guttural 1	נֶאֱכַלְתִּי	נֶאֱכַלְנוּ	נֶאֱכַלְתָּ	נֶאֱכַלְתְּ	נֶאֱכַלְתֶּם	נֶאֱכַלְתֶּם	נֶאֱכַל	נֶאֱכְלָה	נֶאֱכְלוּ	was/were eaten
Guttural 1	ne´eKHALti	ne´eKHALnu	ne´eKHALta	ne´eKHALT	ne´ekhalTEM	ne´ekhalTEN	ne´eKHAL	ne´ekhLA	ne´ekhLU	was/were eaten
Guttural 2	נִבְחַרְתִּי	נִבְחַרְנוּ	נִבְחַרְתָּ	נִבְחַרְתְּ	נִבְחַרְתֶּם	נִבְחַרְתֶּן	נִבְחַר	נִבְחֲרָה	נִבְחֲרוּ	was/were chosen
Guttural 2	nivCHARti	nivCHARnu	nivCHARta	nivCHART	nivcharTEM	nivcharTEN	nivCHAR	nivchaRA	nivchaRU	was/were chosen
Vowel 1	נוֹלַדְתִּי	נוֹלַדְנוּ	נוֹלַדְתָּ	נוֹלַדְתְּ	נוֹלַדְתֶּם	נוֹלַדְתֶּן	נוֹלַד	נוֹלְדָה	נוֹלְדוּ	was/were born
Vowel 1	noLAdeti	noLADnu	noLAdeta	noLAdet	noladeTEM	noladeTEN	noLAD	nolDA	nolDU	was/were born
Vowel 2	נידונתי/ נִדֹּנְתִּי	נידונו/ נִדֹּנּוּ	נידונת/ נִדֹּנְתָּ	נידונת/ נִדֹּנְתְּ	נידונתם/ נִדָּנְתֶּם	נידונתן/ נִדָּנְתֶּן	נידון/ נִדּוֹן	נידונה/ נִדּוֹנָה	נידונו/ נִדּוֹנוּ	was/were discussed
Vowel 2	niDONti	niDONnu	niDONta	niDONT	nidonTEM	nidonTEN	niDON	niDOna	niDOnu	was/were discussed
Vowel 3	נִשְׁתֵּיתִי	נִשְׁתֵּינוּ	נִשְׁתֵּיתָ	נִשְׁתֵּית	נִשְׁתֵּיתֶם	נִשְׁתֵּיתֶן	נִשְׁתָּה	נִשְׁתְּתָה	נִשְׁתּוּ	was/were drank
Vowel 3	nishTEti	nishTEnu	nishTEta	nishTET	nishteTEM	nishteTEN	nishTA	nishteTA	nishTU	was/were drank
Alef 3	נִמְצֵאתִי	נִמְצֵאנוּ	נִמְצֵאתָ	נִמְצֵאת	נִמְצֵאתֶם	נִמְצֵאתֶן	נִמְצָא	נִמְצְאָה	נִמְצְאוּ	was/were [at]
Alef 3	nimTSEti	nimTSEnu	nimTSEta	nimTSET	nimtseTEM	nimtseTEN	nimTSA	nimtse´A	nimtse´U	was/were [at]
Nun 1	ניתנתי/ נִתַּנְתִּי	ניתנו/ נִתַּנּוּ	ניתנת/ נִתַּנְתָּ	ניתנת/ נִתַּנְתְּ	ניתנתם/ נִתַּנְתֶּם	ניתנתן/ נִתַּנְתֶּן	ניתן/ נִתַּן	נינתנה/ נִתְּנָה	נינתנו/ נִתְּנוּ	was/were given/ let
Nun 1	niTANti	niTANnu	niTANta	niTANT	nitanTEM	nitanTEN	niTAN	nitNA	nitNU	was/were given/ let
Repeating	נְסַבּוֹתִי	נְסַבּוֹנוּ	נְסַבּוֹתָ	נְסַבּוֹת	נְסַבּוֹתֶם	נְסַבּוֹתֶן	נָסַב	נָסַבָּה	נָסַבּוּ	surrounded
Repeating	nesaBOti	nesaBOnu	nesaBOta	nesaBOT	nesaboTEM	nesaboTEM	naSAV	naSAba	naSAbu	surrounded

=== Past participle ===
Present participles are the same as present tense forms, as the Modern Hebrew present tense comes from a present participle form. Not all past participles shown here correspond to an existent adjective or one congruent to the verb's meaning; the ones shown here are just examples.

Past participles are formed according to the tables shown below. The past participle is also commonly used as an adjective (similar to English), and is inflected for number and gender. The passive and reflexive binyans hitpa'el, nif'al, pu'al, and huf'al lack passive participles. Pa'al verbs that have a nif'al form corresponding to its passive voice use the pa'al participle and nif'al present to indicate different states of completion.

The pa'al past participle indicates an action is completely done:

- הַסְּפָרִים כְּתוּבִים /(h)a.sfaˈʁim ktuˈvim/ ("the books are written")

The nif'al present tense indicates that the action is still being done:

- הַסְּפָרִים נִכְתָּבִים /(h)a.sfaˈʁim niχtaˈvim/ ("the books are being written")

As shown below, pi'el and hif'il past participles use the present tense of the passive forms pu'al and huf'al, respectively.

Past participle patterns
Stem	Singular		Plural	
Stem	Masculine	Feminine	Masculine	Feminine
Pa'al
Strong	1a2u3	12u3a	12u3im	12u3ot
Guttural 1	1a2u3	1a2u3a	1a2u3im	1a2u3ot
Guttural 3	1a2ua3	12u3a	12u3im	12u3ot
Vowel 3	1a2uy	12uya	12uyim	12uyot
Pi'el
Strong	me1u22a3	me1u22e3et	me1u22a3im	me1u22a3ot
Guttural 2	me1u2a3	me1u2e3et	me1u2a3im	me1u2a3ot
Guttural 3	me1u22a3	me1u22a3at	me1u22a3im	me1u22a3ot
Vowel 3	me1u22e	me1u22a	me1u22im	me1u22ot
Resh 2	me1ora3	me1ore3et	me1ora3im	me1ora3ot
Po'el	me1o2a3	me1o2e3et	me1o2a3im	me1o2a3ot
Hif'il
Strong	mu12a3	mu12e3et	mu12a3im	mu12a3ot
Guttural 3	mu12a3	mu12a3at	mu12a3im	mu12a3ot
Vowel 1	mu2a3	mu2e3et	mu2a3im	mu2a3ot
Vowel 2	mu1a3	mu1e3et	mu1a3im	mu1a3ot
Vowel 3	mu12e	mu12a	mu12im	mu12ot
Nun 1	mu11a3	mu11e3et	mu11a3im	mu11a3ot
Repeating	mu1a2	mu1a22a	mu1a22im	mu1a22ot

Past participle examples
Stem	Singular		Plural		Meaning
Stem	Masculine	Feminine	Masculine	Feminine	Meaning
Pa'al
Strong	כָּתוּב	כְּתוּבָה	כְּתוּבִים	כְּתוּבוֹת	written
Strong	kaTUV	ktuVA	ktuVIM	ktuVOT	written
Guttural 1	אָכוּל	אֲכוּלָה	אֲכוּלִים	אֲכוּלוֹת	eaten
Guttural 1	aKHUL	akhuLA	akhuLIM	akhuLOT	eaten
Guttural 3	בָּלוּעַ	בְּלוּעָה	בְּלוּעִים	בְּלוּעוֹת	swallowed
Guttural 3	baLUA`	blu`A	blu`IM	blu`OT	swallowed
Vowel 3	שָׁתוּי	שְׁתוּיָה	שְׁתוּיִים	שְׁתוּיוֹת	drunk
Vowel 3	shaTUY	shtuYA	shtuYIM	shtuYOT	drunk
Pi'el
Strong	מנודב/ מְנֻדָּב	מנודבת/ מְנֻדֶּבֶת	מנודבים/ מְנֻדָּבִים	מנודבות/ מְנֻדָּבוֹת	contributed
Strong	menuDAV	menuDEvet	menudaVIM	menudaVOT	contributed
Guttural 2	משוחק/ מְשֻׂחָק	משוחקת/ מְשֻׂחֶקֶת	משוחקים/ מְשֻׂחָקִים	משוחקות/ מְשֻׂחָקוֹת	played
Guttural 2	mesuCHAK	mesuCHEket	mesuchaKIM	mesuchaKOT	played
Guttural 3	משוגע/ מְשֻׁגַּע	משוגעת/ מְשֻׁגַּעַת	משוגעים/ מְשֻׁגָּעִים	משוגעות/ מְשֻׁגָּוֹת	crazy
Guttural 3	meshuGA`	meshuGA`at	meshuga`IM	meshuga`OT	crazy
Vowel 3	מנוסה/ מְנֻסֶּה	מנוסה/ מְנֻסָּה	מנוסים/ מְנֻסִּים	מנוסות/ מְנֻסּוֹת	experienced
Vowel 3	menuSE	menuSA	menuSIM	menuSOT	experienced
Resh 2	מסורב/ מְסֹרָב	מסורבת/ מְסֹרֶבֶת	מסורבים/ מְסֹרָבִים	מסורבות/ מְסֹרָבוֹת	refused
Resh 2	mesoRAV	mesoREvet	mesoraVIM	mesoraVOT	refused
Po'el	מְרוֹמָם	מְרוֹמֶמֶת	מְרוֹמָמִים	מְרוֹמָמוֹת	raised
Po'el	meroMAM	meroMEmet	meromaMIM	meromaMOT	raised
Hif'il
Strong	מוזמן/ מֻזְמָן	מוזמנת/ מֻזְמֶנֶת	מוזמנים/ מֻזְמָנִים	מוזמנות/ מֻזְמָנוֹת	invited, ordered
Strong	muzMAN	muzMEnet	muzmaNIM	muzmaNOT	invited, ordered
Guttural 3	מופתע/ מֻפְתַּע	מופתעת/ מֻפְתַּעַת	מופתעים/ מוּפְתָּעִים	מופתעות/ מֻפְתָּעוֹת	surprised
Guttural 3	mufTA`	mufTA`at	mufta`IM	mufta`OT	surprised
Vowel 1	מוֹבָל	מוֹבֶלֶת	מוֹבָלִים	מוֹבָלוֹת	led
Vowel 1	moVAL	moVElet	movaLIM	movaLOT	led
Vowel 2	מוּבָן	מוּבֶנֶת	מוּבָנִים	מוּבָנוֹת	understood
Vowel 2	muVAN	muVEnet	muvaNIM	muvaNOT	understood
Vowel 3	מופנה/ מֻפְנֶה	מופנה/ מֻפְנָה	מופנים/ מֻפְנִים	מופנות/ מֻפְנוֹת	turned
Vowel 3	mufNE	mufNA	mufNIM	mufNOT	turned
Nun 1	מוכר/ מֻכָּר	מוכרת/ מֻכֶּרֶת	מוכרים/ מֻכָּרִים	מוכרות/ מֻכָּרוֹת	recognized
Nun 1	muKAR	muKEret	mukaRIM	mukaROT	recognized
Repeating	מוּסָב	מוּסֶבֶת	מוּסַבִּים	מוּסַבִּוֹת	changed
Repeating	muSAV	muSEvet	musaBIM	musaBOT	changed

=== Future tense ===
A verb in the future tense (עָתִיד /(ʔ)aˈtid/ 'atid) inflects for person, number, and gender; which is expressed by adding prefixes and suffixes to stems shown below. The second-person singular masculine and third-person singular feminine forms are identical for all verbs in the future tense. Historically, there have been separate feminine forms for the second and third person plural (shown in italics on the table). These are still occasionally used today (most often in formal settings); however, in everyday speech, most use the historically masculine plural for both genders.

Future tense subject affixes
Person	Singular		Plural	
Person	Masculine	Feminine	Masculine	Feminine
1st person	א־		נ־	
2nd person	ת־	ת־ -ִי	ת־ ־וּ	ת־ ־נָה
3rd person	י־	ת־	י־ ־וּ	ת־ ־נָה

Future tense patterns
Stem	1st person									
Stem	Singular א־ / '-	Plural נ־/ n-	2nd person Singular		3rd person Singular		2nd person Plural		3rd person Plural	
Stem	Singular א־ / '-	Plural נ־/ n-	Masculine ת־/ t-	Feminine ת־-ִי/ t- -i	Masculine י־/ y-	Feminine ת־/ t-	Masculine ת־ ־וּ/ t- -u	Feminine ת־ ־נה/ t- -na	Masculine י־ ־וּ/ y- -u	Feminine ת־ ־נה/ t- -na
Pa'al
Strong	´e12o3	ni12o3	ti12o3	ti12e3i	yi12o3	ti12o3	ti12e3u	ti12o3na	yi12e3u	ti12o3na
Guttural 1	´e1e2o3	na1a2o3	ta1a2o3	ta1a23i	ya1a2o3	ta1a2o3	ta1a23u	ta1a2o3na	ya1a23u	ta1a2o3na
Guttural 2	´e12a3	ni12a3	ti12a3	ti12a3i	yi12a3	ti12a3	ti12a3u	ti12a3na	yi12a3u	ti12a3na
Guttural 3 or stative (like לִלְמֹד)	´e12a3	ni12a3	ti12a3	ti12e3i	yi12a3	ti12a3	ti12e3u	ti12a3na	yi12e3u	ti12a3na
Vowel 3	´e12e	ni12e	ti12e	ti12i	yi12e	ti12e	ti12u	ti12ena	yi12u	ti12ena
Alef 1	´o2a3	no2a3	to2a3	to23i	yo2a3	to2a3	to23u	to2a3na	yo23u	to2a3na
Vav 1	´e2a3	ne2a3	te2a3	te23i	ye2a3	te2a3	te23u	te1a3na	ye23u	te1a3na
Vav 2	´a1u3	na1u3	ta1u3	ta1u3i	ya1u3	ta1u3	ta1u3u	ta1o3na	ya1u3u	ta1o3na
Yud 1	´i2a3	ni2a3	ti2a3	ti23i	yi2a3	ti2a3	ti23u	ti2a3na	yi23u	ti2a3na
Yud 2	´a1i3	na1i3	ta1i3	ta1i3i	ya1i3	ta1i3	ta1i3u	ta1e3na	ya1i3u	ta1e3na
Nun 1	´e22o3	ni22o3	ti22o3	ti22e3i	yi22o3	ti22o3	ti22e3u	ti22a3na	yi22e3u	ti22a3na
Repeating	´a1o2	na1o2	ta1o2	ta1o22i	ya1o2	ta1o2	ta1o22u	te1u22ena	ya1o22u	te1u22ena
Pi'el
Strong	´a1a22e3	ne1a22e3	te1a22e3	te1a223i	ye1a22e3	te1a22e3	te1a223u	te1a22e3na	ye1a223u	te1a22e3na
Guttural 2	´a1a2e3	ne1a2e3	te1a2e3	te1a2a3i	ye1a2e3	te1a2e3	te1a2a3u	te1a2e3na	ye1a2a3u	te1a2e3na
Guttural 3	´a1a22ea3	ne1a22ea3	te1a22ea3	te1a223i	ye1a22ea3	te1a22ea3	te1a223u	te1a22a3na	ye1a223u	te1a22a3na
Vowel 3	´a1a22e	ne1a22e	te1a22e	te1a22i	ye1a22e	te1a22e	te1a22u	te1a22ena	ye1a22u	te1a22ena
Po'el	´a1o2e3	ne1o2e3	te1o2e3	te1o23i	ye1o2e3	te1o2e3	te1o23u	te1o2e3na	ye1o23u	te1o2e3na
Hif'il
Strong	´a12i3	na12i3	ta12i3	ta12i3i	ya12i3	ta12i3	ta12i3u	ta12e3na	ya12i3u	ta12e3na
Guttural 1	´a1a2i3	na1a2i3	ta1a2i3	ta1a2i3i	ya1a2i3	ta1a2i3	ta1a2i3u	ta1a2e3na	ya1a2i3u	ta1a2e3na
Guttural 3	´a12ia3	na12ia3	ta12ia3	ta12i3i	ya12ia3	ta12ia3	ta12i3u	ta12a3na	ya12i3u	ta12a3na
Vowel 1	´o2i3	no2i3	to2i3	to2i3i	yo2i3	to2i3	to2i3u	to2e3na	yo2i3u	to2e3na
Vowel 2	´a1i3	na1i3	ta1i3	ta1i3i	ya1i3	ta1i3	ta1i3u	ta1e3na	ya1i3u	ta1e3na
Vowel 3	´a12e	na12e	ta12e	ta12i	ya12e	ta12e	ta12u	ta12ena	ya12u	ta12ena
Nun 1	´a22i3	na22i3	ta22i3	ta22i3i	ya22i3	ta22i3	ta22i3u	ta22e3na	ya22i3u	ta22e3na
Repeating	´a1e2	na1e2	ta1e2	ta1i22i	ya1e2	ta1e2	ta1i22u	te1i22ena	ya1i22u	te1i22ena
Hitpa'el
Strong	´et1a22e3	nit1a22e3	tit1a22e3	tit1a223i	yit1a22e3	tit1a22e3	tit1a223u	tit1a22e3na	yit1a223u	tit1a22e3na
Guttural 2	´et1a2e3	nit1a2e3	tit1a2e3	tit1a2a3i	yit1a2e3	tit1a2e3	tit1a2a3u	tit1a2e3na	yit1a2a3u	tit1a2e3na
Guttural 3	´et1a22ea3	nit1a23ea3	tit1a23ea3	tit1a223i	yit1a23ea3	tit1a23ea3	tit1a223u	tit1a22a3na	yit1a223u	tit1a22a3na
Vowel 3	´et1a22e	nit1a22e	tit1a22e	tit1a22i	yit1a22e	tit1a22e	tit1a22u	tit1a22ena	yit1a22u	tit1a22ena
Hitpo'el	´et1o2e3	nit1o2e3	tit1o2e3	tit1o23i	yit1o2e3	tit1o2e3	tit1o23u	tit1o2e3na	yit1o23u	tit1o2e3na
Nif'al
Strong	´e11a2e3	ni11a2e3	ti11a2e3	ti11a23i	yi11a2e3	ti11a2e3	ti11a23u	ti11a2e3na	yi11a23u	ti11a2e3na
Guttural 1	´e1a2e3	ne1a2e3	te1a2e3	te1a23i	ye1a2e3	te1a2e3	te1a23u	te1a2e3na	ye1a23u	te1a2e3na
Guttural 3	´e11a2a3	ni11a2a3	ti11a2a3	ti11a2a3i	yi11a2a3	ti11a2a3	ti11a2a3u	ti11a2a3na	yi11a2a3u	ti11a2a3na
Vowel 1	´eva2e3	niva2e3	tiva2e3	tiva23i	yiva2e3	tiva2e3	tiva23u	tiva2e3na	yiva23u	tiva2e3na
Vowel 2	´e11o3	ni11o3	ti11o3	ti11o3i	yi11o3	ti11o3	ti11o3u	ti11o3ena	yi11o3u	ti11o3ena
Vowel 3	´e11a2e	ni11a2e	ti11a2e	ti11a2i	yi11a2e	ti11a2e	ti11a2u	ti11a2ena	yi11a2u	ti11a2ena
Repeating	´e11a2	ni11a2	ti11a2	ti11a22i	yi11a2	ti11a2	ti11a22u	ti11a22ena	yi11a22u	ti11a22ena
Pu'al
Strong	´a1u22a3	ne1u22a3	te1u22a3	te1u223i	ye1u22a3	te1u22a3	te1u223u	te1u22a3na	ye1u223u	te1u22a3na
Guttural 2	´a1u2a3	ne1u2a3	te1u2a3	te1u2a3i	ye1u2a3	te1u2a3	te1u2a3u	te1u2a3na	ye1u2a3u	te1u2a3na
Resh 2	´a1ora3	ne1ora3	te1ora3	te1or3i	ye1ora3	te1ora3	te1or3u	te1ora3na	ye1or3u	te1ora3na
Vowel 3	´a1u22e	ne1u22e	te1u22e	te1u22i	ye1u22e	te1u22e	te1u22u	te1u22eyna	ye1u22u	ye1u22eyna
Alef 3	´a1u2a	ne1u2a	te1u2a	te1u2´i	ye1u2a	te1u2a	te1u2´u	te1u2ena	ye1u2´u	te1u2ena

Future tense examples
Stem	1st person										Meaning
Stem	Singular	Plural	2nd person Singular		3rd person Singular		2nd person Plural		3rd person Plural		Meaning
Stem	Singular	Plural	Masculine	Feminine	Masculine	Feminine	Masculine	Feminine	Masculine	Feminine	Meaning
Pa'al
Strong	אכתוב/ אֶכְתֹּב	נכתוב/ נִכְתֹּב	תכתוב/ תִּכְתֹּב	תכתבי/ תִּכְתְּבִי	יכתוב/ יִכְתֹּב	תכתוב/ תִּכְתֹּב	תִּכְתְּוּ	תכתובנה/ תִּכְתֹּבְנָה	יִכְתְּבוּ	תכתובנה/ תִּכְתֹּבְנָה	will write
Strong	´ekhTOV	nikhTOV	tikhTOV	tikhteVI	yikhTOV	tikhTOV	tikhteVU	tikhTOVna	yikhteVU	tikhTOVna	will write
Guttural 1	אעצור/ אֶעֱצֹר	נעצור/ נַעֲצֹר	תעצור/ תַּעֲצֹר	תעצרי/ תַּעֲצְרִי	יעצור/ יַעֲצֹר	תעצור/ תַּעֲצֹר	תַּעֲצְרוּ	תעצורנה/ תַּעֲצֹרְנָה	יַעֲצְרוּ	תעצורנה/ תַּעֲצֹרְנָה	will stop
Guttural 1	´e`eTSOR	na`aTSOR	ta`aTSOR	ta`atsRI	ya`aTSOR	ta`aTSOR	ta`atsRU	ta`aTSORna	ya`atsRU	ta`aTSORna	will stop
Guttural 3 or stative	אֶבְלַע	נִבְלַע	תִּבְלַע	תִּבְלְעִי	יִבְלַע	תִּבְלַע	תִּבְלְעוּ	תִּבְלַעְנָה	יִבְלְעוּ	תִּבְלַעְנָה	will swallow
Guttural 3 or stative	´evLA`	nivLA`	tivLA`	tivle`I	yivLA`	tivLA`	tivle`U	tivLA`na	yivle`U	tivLA`na	will swallow
Vowel 3	אֶשְׁתֶּה	נִשְׁתֶּה	תִּשְׁתֶּה	תִּשְׁתִּי	יִשְׁתֶּה	תִּשְׁתֶּה	תִּשְׁתוּ	תִּשְׁתֶּינָה	יִשְׁתּוּ	תִּשְׁתֶּינָה	will drink
Vowel 3	´eshTE	nishTE	tishTE	tishTI	yishTE	tishTE	tishTU	tishTEna	yishTU	tishTEna	will drink
Alef 1	אוכל/ אֹכַל	נֹאכַל	תֹּאכַל	תֹּאכְלִי	יֹאכַל	תֹּאכַל	תֹּאכְלוּ	תֹּאכַלְנָה	יֹאכְלוּ	תֹּאכַלְנָה	will eat
Alef 1	´oKHAL	noKHAL	toKHAL	tokhLI	yoKHAL	toKHAL	tokhLU	toKHALna	yokhLU	toKHALna	will eat
Vav 1	אֵלֵד	נֵלֵד	תֵּלֵד	תֵּלְדִי	יֵלֵד	תֵּלֵד	תֵּלְדוּ	תֵּלֵדְנָה	יֵלְדוּ	תֵּלֵדְנָה	will give birth
Vav 1	´eLED	neLED	teLED	telDI	yeLED	teLED	telDU	teLEDna	yelDU	teLEDna	will give birth
Vav 2	אדון/ אָדוּן	נדון/ נָדוּן	תדון/ תָּדוּן	תדוני/ תָּדוּנִי	ידון/ יָדוּן	תדון/ תָּדוּן	תדונו/ תָּדוּנוּ	תדונה/ תָּדֹנָּה	ידונו/ יָדוּנוּ	תדונה/ תָּדֹנָּה	will discuss
Vav 2	´aDUN	naDUN	taDUN	taDUni	yaDUN	taDUN	taDUnu	taDONna	yaDUnu	taDONna	will discuss
Yud 1	אצור/ אֶצֹּר	ניצור/ נִצֹּר	תיצור/ תִּצֹּר	תיצרי/ תִּצְּרִי	ייצור/ יִצֹּר	תיצור/ תִּצֹּר	תִּצְּרוּ	תיצורנה/ תִּצֹּרְנָה	ייצרו/ יִצְּרוּ	תיצורנה/ תִּצֹּרְנָה	will create
Yud 1	´eTSOR	niTSOR	tiTSOR	titsRI	yiTSOR	tiTSOR	titsRU	tiTSORna	yitsRU	tiTSORna	will create
Yud 2	אָשִׁיר	נָשִׁיר	תָּשִׁיר	תָּשִׁירִי	יָשִׁיר	תָּשִׁיר	תָּשִׁירוּ	תָּשֵׁרְנָה	יָשִׁירוּ	תָּשֵׁרְנָה	will sing
Yud 2	´aSHIR	naSHIR	taSHIR	taSHIri	yaSHIR	taSHIR	taSHIru	taSHERna	yaSHIru	taSHERna	will sing
Nun 1 (gemination not mandatory)	אשוך/ אֶשֹּׁךְ	נישוך/ נִשֹּׁךְ	תישוך/ תִּשֹּׁךְ	תישכי/ תִשְּׁכִי	יישוך/ יִשֹּׁךְ	תישוך/ תִשֹּׁךְ	תישכו/ תִשְּׁכוּ	תישוכנה/ תִּשֹּׁכְנָה	יישכו/ יִשְּׁכוּ	תישוכנה/ תִּשֹּׁכְנָה	will bite
Nun 1 (gemination not mandatory)	´eSHOKH	niSHOKH	tiSHOKH	tishKHI	yiSHOKH	tiSHOKH	tishKHU	tiSHOKHna	yishKHU	tiSHOKHna	will bite
Repeating (multiple forms)	אסוב/ אָסֹב	נסוב/ נָסֹב	תסוב/ תָּסֹב	תסובי/ תָּסֹבִּי	יסוב/ יָסֹב	תסוב/ תָּסֹב	תסובו/ תָּסֹבּוּ	תסובנה/ תָּסֹבְנָה	יסובו/ יָסֹבּוּ	תסובנה/ תָּסֹבְנָה	will spin
Repeating (multiple forms)	´aSOV	naSOV	taSOV	taSObi	yaSOV	taSOV	taSObu	taSOVna	yaSObu	taSOVna	will spin
Pi'el
Strong	אֲנַדֵּב	נְנַדֵּב	תְנַדֵּב	תְנַדְּבִי	יְנַדֵּב	תְנַדֵּב	תְנַדְּבוּ	תְנַדֵּבְנָה	יְנַדְּבוּ	תְנַדֵּבְנָה	will contribute
Strong	´anaDEV	nenaDEV	tenaDEV	tenadVI	yenaDEV	tenaDEV	tenadVU	tenaDEVna	yenadVU	tenaDEVna	will contribute
Guttural 2	אֲבָאֵס	נְבָאֵס	תְּבָאֵס	תְּבָאֲסִי	יְבָאֵס	תְּבָאֵס	תְּבַאֲסוּ	תְּבָאֵסְנָה	יְבָאֲסוּ	תְּבָאֵסְנָה	will make upset
Guttural 2	´ava´ES	neva´ES	teva´ES	teva´aSI	yeva´ES	teva´ES	teva´aSU	teva´ESna	yeva´aSU	teva´ESna	will make upset
Guttural 3	אֲשַׁגֵּעַ	נְשַׁגֵּעַ	תְּשַׁגֵּעַ	תְּשַׁגְעִי	יְשַׁגֵּעַ	תְּשַׁגֵּעַ	תְּשַׁגְּעוּ	תְּשַׁגַּעְנָה	יְשַׁגּעוּ	תְּשַׁגַּעְנָה	will drive crazy
Guttural 3	´ashaGEA`	neshaGEA`	teshaGEA`	teshag`I	yeshaGEA`	teshaGEA`	teshag`U	teshaGA`na	yeshag`U	teshaGA`na	will drive crazy
Vowel 3	אֲנָסֶּה	נְנַסֶּה	תְנַסֶּה	תְנַסִּי	יְנַסֶּה	תְנַסֶּה	תְנַסּוּ	תְנַסֶּינָה	יְנַסּוּ	תְנַסֶּינָה	will try
Vowel 3	´anaSE	nenaSE	tenaSE	tenaSI	yenaSE	tenaSE	tenaSU	tenaSEna	yenaSU	tenaSEna	will try
Po'el	אֲרוֹמֵם	נְרוֹמֵם	תְרוֹמֵם	תְרוֹמְמִי	יְרוֹמֵם	תְרוֹמֵם	תְרוֹמְמוּ	תְרוֹמֵמְנָה	יְרוֹמְמוּ	תְרוֹמֵמְנָה	will raise
Po'el	´aroMEM	neroMEM	teroMEM	teromeMI	yeroMEM	teroMEM	teromeMU	teroMEMna	yeromeMU	teroMEMna	will raise
Hif'il
Strong	אַזְמִין	נַזְמִין	תַּזְמִין	תַּזְמִינִי	יַזְמִין	תַּזְמִין	תַּזְמִינוּ	תַּזְמֵנָּה	יַזְמִינוּ	תַּזְמֵנָּה	will invite, order
Strong	´azMIN	nazMIN	tazMIN	tazMIni	yazMIN	tazMIN	tazMInu	tazMENna	yazMInu	tazMENna	will invite, order
Guttural 1	אַעֲדִיף	נַעֲדִיף	תַּעֲדִיף	תַּעֲדִיפִי	יַעֲדִף	תַּעֲדִיף	תַּעֲדִפוּ	תַעֲדֵפְנָה	יַעֲדִיפוּ	תַעֲדֵפְנָה	will prefer
Guttural 1	´a`aDIF	na`aDIF	ta`aDIF	ta`aDIfi	ya`aDIF	ta`aDIF	ta`aDIfu	ta`aDEFna	ya`aDIfu	ta`aDEFna	will prefer
Guttural 3	אַפְתִּיעַ	נַפְתִּיעַ	תַפְתִּיעַ	תַפְתִּיעִי	יַפְתִּיעַ	תַפְתִּיעַ	תַפְתִּיעוּ	תַפְתַּעְנָה	יַפְתִּיעוּ	תַפְתַּעְנָה	will surprise
Guttural 3	´afTIA`	nafTIA`	tafTIA`	tafTI`i	yafTIA`	tafTIA`	tafTI`u	tafTA`na	yafTI`u	tafTA`na	will surprise
Vowel 1	אוֹבִיל	נוֹבִיל	תוֹבִיל	תוֹבְלִי	יוֹבִיל	תוֹבִיל	תוֹבִילוּ	תוֹבֵלְנָה	יוֹבִילוּ	תוֹבֵלְנָה	will lead
Vowel 1	´oVIL	noVIL	toVIL	toVIli	yoVIL	toVIL	toVIlu	toVELna	yoVIlu	toVELna	will lead
Vowel 2	אָבִין	נָבִין	תָּבִין	תָּבִינִי	יָבִין	תָּבִין	תָּבִינוּ	תָּבֵנָּה	יָבִינוּ	תָּבֵנָּה	will understand
Vowel 2	´aVIN	naVIN	taVIN	taVIni	yaVIN	taVIN	taVInu	taVENna	yaVInu	taVENna	will understand
Vowel 3	אַפְנֶה	נַפְנֶה	תַפְנֶה	תַפְנִי	יַפְנֶה	תַפְנֶה	תַפְנוּ	תַפְנֶינָה	יַפְנוּ	תַפְנֶינָה	will turn
Vowel 3	´afNE	nafNE	tafNE	tafNI	yafNE	tafNE	tafNU	tafNEna	yafNU	tafNEna	will turn
Nun 1	אַכִּיר	נַכִּיר	תַכִּיר	תַכִּירִי	יַכִּיר	תַכִּיר	תַכִּירוּ	תַכֵּרְנָה	יַכִּירוּ	תַכֵּרְנָה	will recognize
Nun 1	´aKIR	naKIR	taKIR	taKIri	yaKIR	taKIR	taKIru	taKERna	yaKIru	taKERna	will recognize
Repeating	אָסֵב	נָסֵב	תָסֵב	תָּסֵבִּי	יָסֵב	תָסֵב	תָסֵבּוּ	תָּסֵבְנָה	יָסֵבּוּ	תָּסֵבְנָה	will change
Repeating	´aSEV	naSEV	taSEV	taSEbi	yaSEV	taSEV	taSEbu	taSEVna	yaSEbu	taSEVna	will change
Hitpa'el
Strong	אֶתְנַדֵּב	נִתְנַדֵּב	תִתְנַדֵּב	תִתְנַדְּבִי	יִתְנַדֵּב	תִתְנַדֵּב	תִתְנַדְּבוּ	תִתְנַדֵּבְנָה	יִתְנַדְּבוּ	תִתְנַדֵּבְנָה	will volunteer
Strong	´etnaDEV	nitnaDEV	titnaDEV	titnadVI	yitnaDEV	titnaDEV	titnadVU	titnaDEVna	yitnadVU	titnaDEVna	will volunteer
Guttural 2	אֶתְבָּאֶס	נִתְבָּאֵס	תִתְבָּאֵס	תִתְבָּאֲסִי	יִתְבָּאֵס	תִתְבָּאֵס	תִתְבָּאֲסוּ	תִתְבָּאֵסְנָה	יִתְבָּאֲסוּ	תִתְבָּאֵסְנָה	will get upset
Guttural 2	´etba´ES	nitba´ES	titba´ES	titba´aSI	yitba´ES	titba´ES	titba´aSU	titba´ESna	yitba´aSU	titba´ESna	will get upset
Guttural 3	אֶשְׁתַּגֵּעַ	נִשְׁתַּגֵּעַ	תִשְׁתַּגֵּעַ	תִשְׁתַּגְּעִי	יִשְׁתַּגֵּעַ	תִשְׁתַּגֵּעַ	תִשְׁתַגְּעוּ	תִשְׁתַּגַּעְנָה	יִשְׁתַּגּעוּ	תִשְׁתַּגַּעְנָה	will go crazy
Guttural 3	´eshtaGEA`	nishtaGEA`	tishtaGEA`	tishtag`I	yishtaGEA`	tishtaGEA`	tishtag`U	tishtaGA`na	yishtag`U	tishtaGA`na	will go crazy
Vowel 3	אֶתְנָסֶּה	נִתְנַסֶּה	תִתְנַסֶּה	תִתְנַסִּי	יִתְנַסֶּה	תִתְנַסֶּה	תִתְנַסּוּ	תִתְנַסֶּינָה	יִתְנַסּוּ	תִתְנַסֶּינָה	will experience
Vowel 3	´etnaSE	nitnaSE	titnaSE	titnaSI	yitnaSE	titnaSE	titnaSU	titnaSEna	yitnaSU	titnaSEna	will experience
Hitpo'el	אֶתְרוֹמֵם	נִתְרוֹמֵם	תִתְרוֹמֵם	תִתְרוֹמְמִי	יִתְרוֹמֵם	תִתְרוֹמֵם	תִתְרוֹמְמוּ	תִתְרוֹמֵמְנָה	יִתרוֹמְמוּ	תִתְרוֹמֵמְנָה	will rise
Hitpo'el	´etroMEM	nitroMEM	titroMEM	titromeMI	yitroMEM	titroMEM	titromeMU	titroMEMna	yitromeMU	titroMEMna	will rise
Nif'al
Strong	איכתב/ אֶכָּתֵב	ניכתב/ נִכָּתֵב	תיכתב/ תִכָּתֵב	תיכתבי/ תִכָּתְבִי	ייכתב/ יִכָּתֵב	תיכתב/ תִכָּתֵב	תיכתבו/ תִכָּתְבוּ	תיכתבנה/ תִכָּתֵבְנָה	ייכתבו/ יִכָּבְוּ	תיכתבנה/ תִכָּתֵבְנָה	will be written
Strong	´ekaTEV	nikaTEV	tikaTEV	tikatVI	yikaTEV	tikaTEV	tikatVU	tikaTEVna	yikatVU	tikaTEVna	will be written
Guttural 1	איאכל/ אֵאָכֵל	ניאכל/ נֵאָכֵל	תיאכל/ תֵאָכֵל	תיאכלי/ תֵאָכְלִי	ייאכל/ יֵאָכֵל	תיאכל/ תֵאָכֵל	תיאכלו/ תֵאָכְלָוּ	תיאכלנה/ תֵאָכֵלְנָה	יאכלו/ יֵאָכְלוּ	תיאכלנה/ תֵאָכֵלְנָה	will be eaten
Guttural 1	´e´aKHEL	ne´aKHEL	te´aKHEL	te´akhLI	ye´aKHEL	te´aKHEL	te´akhLU	te´aKHELna	ye´akhLU	te´aKHELna	will be eaten
Guttural 3	איבלע/ אֶבָּלַע	ניבלע/ נִבָּלַע	תיבלע/ תִבָּלַע	תיבלעי/ תִבָּלְעִי	ייבלע/ יִבָּלַע	תיבלע/ תִבָּלַע	תיבלעו/ תִבָּלְעוּ	תיבלענה/ תִבָּלַעְנָה	ייבלעו/ יִבָּלְעוּ	תיבלענה/ תִבָּלַעְנָה	will be swallowed
Guttural 3	´ebaLA`	nibaLA`	tibaLA`	tibal`I	yibaLA`	tibaLA`	tibal`U	tibaLA`na	yibal`U	tibaLA`na	will be swallowed
Vowel 1	איוולד/ אֶוָּלֵד	ניוולד/ נִוָּלֵד	תיוולד/ תִוָּלֵד	תיוולדי/ תִוָּלְדִי	ייוולד/ יִוָּלֵד	תיוולד/ תִוָּלֵד	תיוולדו/ תִוָּלְדוּ	תיוולדנה/ תִוָּלֵדְנָה	ייוולדו/ יִוָּלְדוּ	תיוולדנה/ תִוָּלֵדְנָה	will be born
Vowel 1	´evaLED	nivaLED	tivaLED	tivalDI	yivaLED	tivaLED	tivalDU	tivaLEDna	yivalDU	tivaLEDna	will be born
Vowel 2	אידון/ אֶדּוֹן	נידון/ נִדּוֹן	תידון/ תִּדּוֹן	תידוני/ תִּדּוֹנִי	יידון/ יִדּוֹן	תידון/ תִּדּוֹן	תידונו/ תִּדּוֹנוּ	תידונה/ תִּדֹּנָּה	יידונו/ יִדּוֹנוּ	תידונה/ תִּדֹּנָּה	will be discussed
Vowel 2	´eDON	niDON	tiDON	tiDOni	yiDON	tiDON	tiDOnu	tiDONna	yiDOnu	tiDONna	will be discussed
Vowel 3	אישתה/ אֶשָּׁתֶה	נישתה/ נִשָּׁתֶה	תישתה/ תִשָּׁתֶה	תישתי/ תשָּׁתִי	יישתה/ יִשָּׁתֶה	תישתה/ תִשָּׁתֶה	תישתו/ תִשָּׁתוּ	תישתינה/ תִשָּׁתֵינָה	יישתו/ יִשָּׁתוּ	תישתינה/ תִשָּׁתֵינָה	will be drunk
Vowel 3	´eshaTE	nishaTE	tishaTE	tishaTI	yishaTE	tishaTE	tishaTU	tishaTEna	yishaTU	tishaTEna	will be drunk
Repeating	איסב/ אֶסַּב	ניסב/ נִסַּב	תיסב/ תִּסַּב	תיסבי/ תִסַּבִּי	ייסב/ יִסַּב	תיסב/ תִסַּב	תיסבו/ תִסַּבּוּ	תיסבנה/ תִּסַּבְנָה	ייסבו/ יִסַּבּוּ	תיסבנה/ תִּסַּבְנָה	will surround
Repeating	´eSAV	niSAV	tiSAV	tiSAbi	yiSAV	tiSAV	tiSAbu	tiSAVna	yiSAbu	tiSAVna	will surround

As in the past tense, personal pronouns are not strictly necessary in the future tense, as the verb forms are sufficient to identify the subject, but they are frequently used.

=== Imperative ===
All imperatives are only used in affirmative commands, and in predominantly formal contexts. Negative commands use the particle אַל /al/ followed by the corresponding future-tense form; as לא and a future tense negates the declaration not the command (contrast "don't do it" with "[you] won't do it"). The passive binyanim pu'al and huf'al do not have imperatives.

In informal speech, the future tense (shown above) is commonly used for affirmative commands, to avoid the implication of being demanding. So, for example, תִּפְתַּח /tifˈtaħ/ can mean either "you will open" or "would you open" (masculine, singular). In Hebrew, as in English, the more formal way to avoid the implication of commanding is to use the word "please" (בְּבַקָּשָׁה /bevakaʃa/ or נָא /na/ ) with the imperative.

Imperative tense subject suffixes
Person	Singular		Plural	
Person	Masculine	Feminine	Masculine	Feminine
2nd person	no suffix	־י	־וּ	־נָה

Imperative patterns
Stem	Singular		Plural	
Stem	Masculine (no suffix)	Feminine ־י -i	Masculine ־ו -u	Feminine ־נה -na
Pa'al
Strong	12o3	1i23i	1i23u	12o3na
Guttural 1	1a2o3	1i23i	1i23u	1a2o3na
Guttural 2	12a3	1a2a3i	1a2a3u	1e2a3na
Guttural 3	12a3	1i23i	1i23u	12a3na
Vowel 3	12e	12i	12u	12eyna
Alef 1	e2o3	i23i	i23u	e2o3na
Vav 1	2e3	23i	23u	2e3na
Vav 2	1u3	1u3i	1u3u	1o3na
Yud 1	ye2o3	yi23i	yi23u	ye2o3na
Yud 2	1i3	1i3i	1i3u	1e3na
Repeating	1o2	1o22i	1o22u	1u22eyna
Pi'el
Strong	1a22e3	1a223i	1a223u	1a22e3na
Guttural 2	1a2e3	1a2a3i	1a2a3u	1a2e3na
Guttural 3	1a22ea3	1a223i	1a223u	1a22a3na
Vowel 3	1a22e	1a22i	1a22u	1a22eyna
Hif'il
Strong	ha12e3	ha12i3i	ha12i3u	ha12e3na
Guttural 1	ha1a2e3	ha1a2i3i	ha1a2i3u	ha1a2e3na
Guttural 3	ha12ea3	ha12i3i	ha12i3u	ha12a3na
Vowel 1	ho2e3	ho2i3i	ho2i3u	ho2e3na
Vowel 2	ha1e3	ha1i3i	ha1i3u	ha1e3na
Vowel 3	ha12e	ha12i	ha12u	ha12eyna
Nun 1	ha22e3	ha22i3i	ha22i3u	ha22e3na
Repeating	ha1e2	ha1i22i	ha1i22u	ha1e2na
Hitpa'el
Strong	hit1a22e3	hit1a223i	hit1a223u	hit1a22e3na
Guttural 2	hit1a2e3	hit1a2a3i	hit1a2a3u	hit1a2e3na
Guttural 3	hit1a22ea3	hit1a223i	hit1a223u	hit1a22a3na
Vowel 3	hit1a22e	hit1a22i	hit1a22u	hit1a22eyna
Nif'al
Strong	hi11a2e3	hi11a23i	hi11a23u	hi11a2e3na
Guttural 1	hea2e3	hea23i	hea23u	hea2e3na
Guttural 2	hi11a2e3	hi11a2a3i	hi11a2a3u	hi11a2e3na
Guttural 3	ha11a2ea3	hi11a23i	hi11a23u	hi11a2a3na
Vowel 1	hiva2e3	hiva23i	hiva23u	hiva2e3na
Vowel 2	hi11e3	hi113i	hi113u	hi11e3na
Vowel 3	hi11a2e	hi11a2i	hi11a2u	hi11a2eyna
Repeating	hi11a2	hi11a22i	hi11a22u	hi11a2na

Imperative examples
Stem	Singular		Plural		Meaning
Stem	Masculine	Feminine	Masculine	Feminine	Meaning
Pa'al
Strong	כתוב/ כְּתֹב	כתבי/ כִּתְבִי	כִּתְבוּ	כתובנה/ כּתֹבְנָה	write!
Strong	kTOV	kitVI	kitVU	kTOVna	write!
Guttural 1	עצור/ עֲצֹר	עִצְרִי	עִצְרוּ	עצורנה/ עֲצֹרְנָה	stop!
Guttural 1	`aTSOR	`itsRI	`itsRU	`aTSORna	stop!
Guttural 2	בְּחַר	בַּחֲרִי	בַּחֲרוּ	בְּחַרְנָה	choose!
Guttural 2	bCHAR	bachaRI	bachaRU	bCHARna	choose!
Guttural 3	בְּלַע	בִּלְעִי	בִּלְעוּ	בְּלַעְנָה	swallow!
Guttural 3	bLA`	bil`I	bil`U	bLA`na	swallow!
Vowel 3	שְׁתֵה	שְׁתִי	שְׁתוּ	שְׁתֵינָה	drink!
Vowel 3	shTE	shTI	shTU	shTEna	drink!
Alef 1	אכול/ אֱכֹל	אִכְלִי	אִכְלוּ	אכולנה/ אֱכֹלְנָה	eat!
Alef 1	eKHOL	ikhLI	ikhLU	eKHOLna	eat!
Vav 1	לֵד	לְדִי	לְדוּ	לֵדְנָה	give birth!
Vav 1	led	leDI	leDU	LEdna	give birth!
Vav 2	דּוּן	דּוּנִי	דּוּנוּ	דונה/ דֹּנָּה	discuss!
Vav 2	dun	DUni	DUnu	DONna	discuss!
Yud 1	יצור/ יְצֹר	יִצְרִי	יִצְרוּ	יצורנה/ יְצֹרנָה	create!
Yud 1	yeTSOR	yitsRI	yitsRU	yeTSORna	create!
Yud 2	שִׁיר	שִׁירִי	שִׁירוּ	שֵׁרְנָה	sing!
Yud 2	shir	SHIri	SHIru	SHERna	sing!
Repeating	סוב/ סֹב	סובי/ סֹבִּי	סובו/ סֹבּוּ	סובנה/ סֹבְנָה	spin!
Repeating	sov	SObi	SObu	SOVna	spin!
Pi'el
Strong	נַדֵּב	נַדְּבִי	נַדְּבוּ	נַדֵּבְנָה	contribute!
Strong	naDEV	nadVI	nadVU	naDEVna	contribute!
Guttural 2	בָּאֵס	בַּאֲסִי	בַּאֲסוּ	בָּאֵסְנָה	upset!
Guttural 2	ba´ES	ba´aSI	ba´aSU	ba´ESna	upset!
Guttural 3	שַׁגֵּעַ	שַׁגְּעִי	שַׁגְּעוּ	שַׁגַּעְנָה	drive crazy!
Guttural 3	shaGEA`	shag`I	shag`U	shaGA`na	drive crazy!
Vowel 3	נַסֶּה	נַסִּי	נַסּוּ	נַסֶּינָה	try!
Vowel 3	naSE	naSI	naSU	naSEna	try!
Hif'il
Strong	הַזְמֵן	הַזְמִינִי	הַזְמִינִוּ	הַזְמֵנָּה	invite!/ order!
Strong	hazMEN	hazMIni	hazMInu	hazMENna	invite!/ order!
Guttural 1	הַעֲדֵף	הַעֲדִיפִי	הַעֲדִיפוּ	הַעֲדֵפְנָה	prefer!
Guttural 1	ha`aDEF	ha`aDIfi	ha`aDIfu	ha`aDEFna	prefer!
Guttural 3	הַפְתֵּעַ	הַפְתִּיעִי	הַפְתִּיעוּ	הַפְתַּעְנָה	surprise!
Guttural 3	hafTEA`	hafTI`i	hafTI`u	hafTA`na	surprise!
Vowel 1	הוֹבֵל	הוֹבִילִי	הוֹבִילוּ	הוֹבֵלְנָה	lead!
Vowel 1	hoVEL	hoVIli	hoVIlu	hoVELna	lead!
Vowel 2	הָבֵן	הֲבִינִי	הֲבִינוּ	הָבֵנָּה	understand!
Vowel 2	haVEN	haVIni	haVInu	haVENna	understand!
Vowel 3	הַפְנֶה	הַפְנִי	הַפְנוּ	הַפְנֶינָה	turn!
Vowel 3	hafNE	hafNI	hafNU	hafNEna	turn!
Nun 1	הַכֵּר	הַכִּירִי	הַכִּירוּ	הַכֵּרְנָה	recognize!
Nun 1	haKER	haKIri	haKIru	haKERna	recognize!
Repeating	הָסֵב	הָסֵבִּי	הָסֵבּוּ	הָסֵבְנָה	change!
Repeating	haSEV	haSEbi	haSEbu	haSEVna	change!
Hitpa'el
Strong	הִתְנַדֵּב	הִתְנַדְּבִי	הִתְנַדְּבוּ	הִתְנַדֵּבְנָה	volunteer!
Strong	hitnaDEV	Hisnadivi	hitnadVU	hitnaDEVna	volunteer!
Guttural 2	הִתְבָּאֵס	הִתְבַּאֲסִי	הִתְבַּאֲסוּ	הִתְבָּאֵסְנָה	get upset!
Guttural 2	hitba´ES	hitba´aSI	hiba´aSU	hitba´ESna	get upset!
Guttural 3	הִשְׁתַּגֵּעַ	הִשְׁתַּגְּעִי	הִשְׁתַּגְּעוּ	הִשְׁתַּגַּעְנָה	go crazy!
Guttural 3	hishtaGEA`	hishtag`I	hishtag`U	hishtaGA`na	go crazy!
Vowel 3	הִתְנַסֶּה	הִתְנַסִּי	הִתְנַסּוּ	הִתְנַסֶּינָה	experience!
Vowel 3	hitnaSE	hitnaSI	hitnaSU	hitnaSEna	experience!
Nif'al
Strong	היכתב/ הִכָּתֵב	היכתבי/ הִכָּתְבִי	היכתבו/ הִכָּתְבוּ	היכתבנה/ הִכָּתֵבְנָה	be written!
Strong	hikaTEV	hikatVI	hikatVU	hikaTEVna	be written!
Guttural 1	היאכל/ הֵאָכֵל	היאכלי/ הֵאָכְלִי	היאכלו/ הֵאָכְלוּ	היאכלנה/ הֵאָכֵלְנָה	be eaten!
Guttural 1	he´aKHEL	he´akhLI	he´akhLU	he´aKHELna	be eaten!
Guttural 2	היבחר/ הִבָּחֵר	היבחרי/ הִבַּחֲרִי	היבחרו/ הִבַּחֲרוּ	היבחרנה/ הִבָּחֵרְנָה	be chosen!
Guttural 2	hibaCHER	hibachaRI	hibachaRU	hibaCHERna	be chosen!
Guttural 3	היבלע/ הִבָּלֵעַ	היבלעי/ הִבָּלְעִי	היבלעו/ הִבָּלְעוּ	היבלענה/ הִבָּלַעְנָה	be swallowed!
Guttural 3	hibaLEA`	hibal`I	hibal`U	hibaLA`na	be swallowed!
Vowel 1	היוולד/ הִוָּלֵד	היוולדי/ הִוָּלְדִי	היוולדו/ הִוָּלְדוּ	היוולדנה/ הִוָּלֵדְנָה	be born!
Vowel 1	hivaLED	hivalDI	hivalDU	hivaLEDna	be born!
Vowel 2	הידן/ הִדֵּן	הידני/ הִדּנִי	הידנו/ הִדְּנוּ	הידנה/ הִדֵּנָּה	be discussed!
Vowel 2	hiDEN	hidNI	hidNU	hiDENna	be discussed!
Vowel 3	הישתה/ הִשָּׁתֶה	הישתי/ הִשָּׁתִי	הישתו/ הִשָּׁתוּ	הישתינה/ הִשָּׁתֶינָה	be drunk!
Vowel 3	hishaTE	hishaTI	hishaTU	hishaTEna	be drunk!
Repeating	היסב/ הִסַּב	היסבי/ הִסַּבִּי	היסבו/ הִסַּבּוּ	היסבנה/ הִסַּבְנָה	surround!
Repeating	hiSAV	hiSAbi	hiSAbu	hiSAVna	surround!

The infinitive can also be used as a "general imperative" when addressing nobody in particular (i.e., on signs, or when giving general instructions, to children, or large groups); so "נָא לֹא לִפְתֹּחַ" /na lo lifˈtoaħ/ means "please do not open".

There also once were cohortative forms for the first person, and jussive forms for the imperative third person, but this is now obsolete.

=== Infinitive ===
In Modern Hebrew a verb has two infinitives: the infinitive construct (שם הפועל shem hapoal or מקור נסמך) and the rarely used infinitive absolute (מקור מוחלט). The infinitive construct is generally preceded by a preposition (e.g. ב־, כ־, ל־, מ־, עד), usually the inseparable preposition ל־, meaning "to, for", although it can be used without a preposition. This article covers only infinitive construct with the preposition ל־. The passive binyanim pu'al and huf'al do not have infinitives.

Infinitive patterns
Stem	Prefixed	Absolute	Construct
Pa'al
Strong	li12o3	1a2o3	12o3
Guttural 1	1a2o3	1a2o3	1a2o3
Guttural 3	li12oa3	1a2oa3	12oa3
Vowel 3	li12ot	1a2o	12ot
Alef 1	le´e2o3	´a2o3	
Vav 1	la2e3et	ya2o3	ye2o3
Vav 2	la1u3	1o3	1u3
Yud 1	li2o3	ya2o3	ye2o3
Yud 2	la1i3	1o3	1i3
Nun 1	li22o3	na2o3	n2o3
Pi'el
Strong	le1a22e3	1a22e3	
Guttural 3	le1a22ea3	1a22ea3	
Vowel 3	le1a22ot		1a22ot
Hif'il
Strong	leha12i3	ha12e3	ha12i3
Guttural 1	leha1a2i3	ha1a2e3	ha1a2i3
Guttural 3	leha12ia3	ha12ea3	ha12ia3
Vowel 1	leho2i3	ho2e3	ho2i3
Vowel 2	leha1i3	ha1e3	ha1i3
Vowel 3	leha12ot	ha12e	ha12ot
Nun 1	leha22i3	ha22e3	ha22i3
Repeating	leha1e2	ha1e2	ha1e2
Hitpa'el
Strong	lehit1a22e3	hit1a22e3	hit1a22e3
Guttural 3	lehit1a22ea3	hit1a22e3	hit1a22ea3
Vowel 3	lehit1a22ot		hit1a22ot
Nif'al
Strong	lehi11a2e3	hi11a2o3	hi11a2e3
Guttural 1	lehe1a2e3	he1a2o3	he1a2e3
Guttural 3	lehi11a2ea3	hi11a2oa3	hi11a2ea3
Vowel 1	lehiva2e3	hiva2o3	hiva2e3
Vowel 2	lehi11e3	hi11o3	hi11e3
Vowel 3	lehi11a2ot	hi11a2o	hi11a2ot
Repeating	lehi11e2	hi11o2	hi11e2

Infinitive examples
Stem	Prefixed	Non-prefixed		Meaning
Stem	Prefixed	Absolute	Construct	Meaning
Pa'al
Strong	לכתוב/ לִכְתֹּב	כתוב/ כָּתוֹב	כתוב/ כְּתוֹב	to write
Strong	likhTOV	kaTOV	kTOV	to write
Guttural 1	לחלום/ לַחֲלֹם	חלום/ חָלוֹם	חלום/ חֲלֹם	to dream
Guttural 1	lachaLOM	chaLOM	chaLOM	to dream
Guttural 3	לבלוע/ לִבְלֹעַ	ַבלוע/ בָּלוֹע	ַבלוע/ בְּלֹע	to swallow
Guttural 3	livLOA`	baLOA`	bLOA`	to swallow
Vowel 3	לשתות/ לִשְתּוֹת	שתה/ שָתֹה	שתות/ שְתוֹת	to drink
Vowel 3	lishTOT	shaTO	shTOT	to drink
Alef 1	לאכול/ לֶאֱכֹל	אכול/ אָכוֹל	אכול/ אֲכֹל	to eat
Alef 1	le´eKHOL	´aKHOL	´aKHOL	to eat
Vav 1	לָלֶדֶת	יָלוֹד	יְלֹד	to give birth
Vav 1	laLEdet	yaLOD	yeLOD	to give birth
Vav 2	לָדוּן	דוֹן	דוּן	to discuss
Vav 2	laDUN	don	dun	to discuss
Yud 1	ליצור/ לִיצֹר	יצר/ יָצוֹר	יצר/ יְצֹר	to create
Yud 1	liTSOR	yaTSOR	yeTSOR	to create
Yud 2	לָשִׁיר	שׁוֹר	שִׁיר	to sing
Yud 2	laSHIR	shor	shir	to sing
Nun 1	לישוך/ לִשֹּׁךְ	נשוך/ נָשׁוֹךְ	נשוך/ נְשֹׁךְ	to bite
Nun 1	liSHOKH	naSHOKH	neSHOKH	to bite
Pi'el
Strong	לְנַדֵּב	נַדֵּב	נַדֵּב	to contribute
Strong	lenaDEV	naDEV	naDEV	to contribute
Guttural 3	לְשַׁגֵּעַ	שַׁגֵּעַ	שַׁגֵּעַ	to drive crazy
Guttural 3	leshaGEA`	shaGEA`	shaGEA`	to drive crazy
Vowel 3	לְנַסּוֹת		נַסּוֹת	to try
Vowel 3	lenaSOT		naSOT	to try
Hif'il
Strong	לְהַזְמִין	הַזְמֵן	הַזְמִין	to invite, order
Strong	lehazMIN	hazMEN	hazMIN	to invite, order
Guttural 1	לְהַעֲדִיף	הַעֲדֵף	הַעֲדִיף	to prefer
Guttural 1	leha`aDIF	ha`aDEF	ha`aDIF	to prefer
Guttural 3	לְהַפְתִּיעַ			to surprise
Guttural 3	lehafTIA`			to surprise
Vowel 1	לְהוֹבִיל			to lead
Vowel 1	lehoVIL			to lead
Vowel 2	לְהָבִין			to understand
Vowel 2	lehaVIN			to understand
Vowel 3	לְהַפְנוֹת	הַפְנֵה	הַפְנוֹת	to turn
Vowel 3	lehafNOT	hafNE	hafNOT	to turn
Nun 1	לְהַכִּיר	הַכֵּר	הַכִּיר	to know [a person]
Nun 1	lehaKIR	haKER	haKIR	to know [a person]
Repeating	לְהָסֵב			to change
Repeating	lehaSEV			to change
Hitpa'el
Strong	לְהִתְנַדֵּב	הִתְנַדֵּב	הִתְנַדֵּב	to volunteer
Strong	lehitnaDEV	hitnaDEV	hitnaDEV	to volunteer
Guttural 3	לְהִשְׁתַגֵּעַ	הִשְׁתַגֵּעַ	הִשְׁתַגֵּעַ	to go crazy
Guttural 3	lehishtaGEA`	hishtaGEA`	hishtaGEA`	to go crazy
Vowel 3	לְהִתְנַסּוֹת		הִתְנַסּוֹת	to experience
Vowel 3	lehitnaSOT		hitnaSOT	to experience
Nif'al
Strong	להיכתב/ לְהִכָּתֵב	היכתוב/ הִכָּתֹב	היכתב/ הִכָּתֵב	to be written
Strong	lehikaTEV	hikaTOV	hikaTEV	to be written
Guttural 1	להיאכל/ לְהֵאָכֵל			to be eaten
Guttural 1	lehe´aKHEL			to be eaten
Guttural 3	להיבלע/ לְהִבַּלֵעַ			to be swallowed
Guttural 3	lehibaLEA`			to be swallowed
Vowel 1	להיוולד/ לְהִוָּלֵד			to be born
Vowel 1	lehivaLED			to be born
Vowel 2	להידון/ לְהִדּוֹן			to be discussed
Vowel 2	lehiDON			to be discussed
Vowel 3	להישתות/ לְהִשָּתוֹת			to be drunk
Vowel 3	lehishaTOT			to be drunk
Repeating	להיסב/ לְהִסֵּב			to surround
Repeating	lehiSEV			to surround

=== Action noun ===
Action nouns or gerunds (שמות פעולה shmot pe'ula) are nouns derived from a verb's action and so they inflect for number. In Hebrew, gerunds are formed using a specific pattern shown in the table below. Hebrew gerunds cannot be used as adjectives, unlike in English. The passive binyans pu'al and huf'al lack gerunds.

Not all gerunds shown here correspond to an attested noun or a noun with a meaning congruent to that of the verb.

Action noun patterns
Stem	Singular	Plural
Pa'al
Strong	12i3a	12i3ot
Guttural 1	1a2i3a	1a2i3ot
Vowel 2	1i3a	1i3ot
Vowel 3	12iya	12iyot
Pi'el
Strong	1i22u3	1i22u3im
Guttural 3	1i22ua3	1i22u3im
Vowel 3	1i22uy	1i22uyim
Alef/ 'Ayin/ Resh 2	1e2u3	1e2u3im
Hif'il
Strong	ha12a3a	ha12a3ot
Guttural 1	ha1a2a3a	ha1a2a3ot
Vowel 1	ho2a3a	ho2a3ot
Vowel 2	ha1a3a	ha1a3ot
Vowel 3	ha12aya	ha12ayot
Nun 1	ha22a3a	ha22a3ot
Repeating	ha1a22a	ha1a22ot
Hitpa'el
Strong	hit1a223ut	hit1a223uyot
Guttural 3	hit1a2a3ut	hi1a2a3uyot
Vowel 3	hit1a22ut	nit1a22uyot
Nif'al
Strong	hi11a23ut	hi11a23uyot
Guttural 1	he1a23ut	he1a23uyot
Guttural 2	hi11a2a3ut	hi11a2a3uyot
Vowel 1	hiva23ut	hiva23uyot
Vowel 2	hi11e3ut	hi11e3uyot
Vowel 3	hi11a2ut	hi11a2uyot
Repeating	hi1a22ut	hi1a22uyot

Action noun examples
Stem	Singular	Plural	Meaning (if any)
Pa'al
Strong	כתיבה/ כְּתִיבָה	כתיבות/ כְּתִיבוֹת	writing(s)
Strong	ktiva	ktiVOT	writing(s)
Guttural 1	אכילה/ אֲכִילָה	אכילות/ אֲכִילוֹת	
Guttural 1	´akhiLA	´akhiLOT	
Vowel 2	דינה/ דִינָה	דינות/ דִינוֹת	
Vowel 2	diNA	diNOT	
Vowel 3	שתייה/ שְׁתִיָּה	שתייות/ שְׁתִיּוֹת	drink(s)
Vowel 3	shtiYA	shtiYOT	drink(s)
Pi'el
Strong	נידוב/ נִדּוּב	נידובים/ נִדּוּבִים	contribution(s)
Strong	niDUV	niduVIM	contribution(s)
Guttural 3	שיגוע/ שִׁגּוּעַ	שיגועים/ שִׁגּוּעִים	
Guttural 3	shiGUA`	shigu`IM	
Vowel 3	ניסוי/ נִסּוּי	ניסויים/ נִסּוּיִּם	attempt(s)
Vowel 3	niSUY	nisuYIM	attempt(s)
Alef/ 'Ayin/ Resh 2	סירוב/ סֵרוּב	סירובים/ סֵרוּבים	refusal(s)
Alef/ 'Ayin/ Resh 2	seRUV	seruVIM	refusal(s)
Hif'il
Strong	הזמנה/ הַזְמָנָה	הזמנות/ הַזְמָנוֹת	invitation(s)
Strong	hazmaNA	hazmaNOT	invitation(s)
Guttural 1	העדפה/ הַעֲדָפָה	העדפות/ הַעֲדָפוֹת	preference(s)
Guttural 1	ha`adaFA	ha`adaFOT	preference(s)
Vowel 1	הובלה/ הוֹבָלָה	הובלות/ הוֹבָלוֹת	
Vowel 1	hovaLA	hovaLOT	
Vowel 2	הבנה/ הֲבָנָה	הבנות/ הֲבָנוֹת	understanding(s)
Vowel 2	havaNA	havaNOT	understanding(s)
Vowel 3	הפניה/ הַפְנָיָה	הפניות/ הַפְנָיוֹת	
Vowel 3	hafnaYA	hafnaYOT	
Nun 1	הכרה/ הַכָּרָה	הכרות/ הַכּרָוֹת	recognition(s)
Nun 1	hakaRA	hakaROT	recognition(s)
Repeating	הסבה/ הֲסַבָּה	הסבות/ הֲסַבּוֹת	change(s)
Repeating	hasaBA	hasaBOT	change(s)
Hitpa'el
Strong	התנדבות/ הִתְנַדְּבוּת	התנדבויות/ הִתְנַדְּבוּיוֹת	
Strong	hitnadVUT	hitnadvuYOT	
Guttural 2	התבאסות/ הִתְבַּאֲסוּת	התבאסויות/ הִתְבַּאֲסוּיוֹת	
Guttural 2	hitba´aSUT	hitba´asuYOT	
Vowel 3	התנסות/ הִתְנַסּוּת	התנסויות/ הִתְנַסּוּיוֹת	experience(s)
Vowel 3	hitnaSUT	hitnasuYOT	experience(s)
Nif'al
Strong	היכתבות/ הִכַּתְבוּת	היכתבויות/ הִכַּתְבוּיוֹת	
Strong	hikatVUT	hikatvuYOT	
Guttural 1	היאכלות/ הֵאַכְלוּת	היאכלויות/ הֵאַכְלוּיוֹת	
Guttural 1	he´akhLUT	he´akhluYOT	
Guttural 2	היבחרות/ הִבַּחֲרוּת	היבחרויות/ הִבַחֲרוּיוֹת	
Guttural 2	hibachaRUT	hibacharuYOT	
Vowel 1	היוולדות/ הִוַּלְדוּת	הוולדויות/ הִוַּלְדוּיוֹת	
Vowel 1	hivalDUT	hivalduYOT	
Vowel 2	הידנות/ הִדּנֵוּת	הידנויות/ הִדֵּנוּיוֹת	
Vowel 2	hideNUT	hidenuYOT	
Vowel 3	הישתות/ הִשָּׁתוּת	הישתויות/ הִשָּׁתוּיוֹת	
Vowel 3	hishaTUT	hishatuYOT	
Repeating	היסבות/ הִסַּבּוּת	היסבויות/ הִסַּבּוּיוֹת	
Repeating	hisaBUT	hisabuYOT	

== Auxiliary verbs ==
Auxiliary verbs are less common in Hebrew than in other languages. Some common פָּעֳלֵי עֵזֶר po'oley 'ezer (helping verbs) are היה /(h)aˈja/ haya, הלך /halaχ/ halakh, יָכֹל /jaχol/ yakhol, עמד /ʔamad/ 'amad.

In Modern Hebrew the auxiliary היה haya is used for both an analytic conditional/ past-habitual mood and for a simple past-habitual aspect. In either case, היה is conjugated in the past tense and placed before present tense conjugations of the affected verb.

הלך and עמד are used to express an imminent future action. They may be conjugated either in the past or present tense, and are followed by the infinitive construct of the affected verb, prefixed by the inseparable preposition ל־.

=== Modal auxiliaries ===
Modal auxiliaries are often adjectives, adverbs or modal verbs (often defective ones) conjugated in the present tense, and followed by the infinitive construct of the affected verb, prefixed by the inseparable preposition ל־. They may be used in conjunction with the auxiliary היה. Examples include אולי/ אוּלַי ulay, אסור/ אָסוּר asur, חיב/ חַיָּב chayav, מותר/ מֻתָּר mutar, and מוכרח/ מֻכְרָח mukhrach.

יָכֹל yakhol is used to express a possible action. It may be conjugated in past, present or future tense and is followed by the infinitive construct of the affected verb, prefixed by the inseparable preposition -ל.

נִתְכַּן nitkan is used to express a plausible or planned action. It is conjugated in the future tense and is followed with the affected verb prefixed with שֶׁ־ she.

Example: לֹא יִתָּכֵן שֶהוּא רָעֵב Lo yitakhen shehu` ra'ev ("He's unlikely to be hungry")

== Irregular verbs ==
=== אמר/הגיד Amar/Higid (to say, tell) ===
The verb אָמַר is often replaced with forms of הִגִּיד higid in common speech in the future, imperative, and infinitive. Likewise, the verb הִגִּיד is replaced with forms of אָמַר amar in the past and present. However, in formal speech, regular forms for each verb are still used, which are displayed in italics when in uncommon tenses.

Amar/Higid conjugation
to say, tell	אמר Amar				הגיד Higid			
to say, tell	Singular		Plural		Singular		Plural	
to say, tell	Masculine	Feminine	Masculine	Feminine	Masculine	Feminine	Masculine	Feminine
Present
All persons	אומר/ אוֹמֵר	אומרת/ אוֹמֶרֶת	אומרים/ אוֹמְרִים	אומרות/ אוֹמְרוֹת	מגיד	מגידה	מגידים	מגידות
All persons	´oMER	´oMEret	´omRIM	´omROT	maGID	magiDA	magiDIM	magiDOT
Past
1st person	אמרתי/ אָמַרְתִּי		אמרנו/ אָמַרְנוּ		הגדתי/ הִגַּדְתִּי		הגדנו/ הִגִּידְנוּ	
1st person	´aMARti		´aMARnu		hiGAdeti		hiGADnu	
2nd person	אמרת/ אָמַרְתָּ	אמרת/ אָמַרְתְּ	אמרתם/ אָמַרְתֶּם	אמרתן/ אָמַרְתֶּן	הגדת/ הִגַּדְתָּ	הגדת/ הִגַּדְתְּ	הגדתם/ הִגַּדְתֶּם	הגדתן/ הִגַּדְתֶּן
2nd person	´aMARta	´aMART	´amarTEM	´amarTEN	hiGAdeta	hiGAdet	higadeTEM	higadeTEN
3rd person	אמר/ אָמַר	אמרה/ אָמְרָה	אמרו/ אָמְרוּ		הגיד/ הִגִּיד	הגידה/ הִגִּידָה	הגידו/ הִגִּידוּ	
3rd person	´aMAR	´amRA	´amRU		hiGID	hiGIda	hiGIdu	
Past Participle	אמור/ אָמוּר	אמורה/ אֲמוּרָה	אמורים/ אֲמוּרִים	אמורות/ אֲמוּרוֹת	מוגד/ מֻגָּד	מוגדת/ מֻגֶּדֶת	מוגדים/ מֻגָּדִים	מוגדות/ מֻגָּדוֹת
Past Participle	´aMUR	´amuRA	´amuRIM	´amuROT	muGAD	muGEdet	mugaDIM	mugaDOT
Future
1st person	אומר/ אֹמַר		נאמר/ נֹאמַר		אגיד/ אַגִּיד		נגיד/ נַגִּיד	
1st person	´oMAR		noMAR		aGID		naGID	
2nd person	תאמר/ תֹּאמַר	תאמרי/ תֹּאמְרִי	תאמרו/ תֹּאמְרוּ	תאמרנה/ תֹּאמַרְנָה	תגיד/ תַגִּיד	תגידי/ תַגִּידִי	תגידו/ תַגִּידוּ	תגדנה/ תַגֵּדְנָה
2nd person	toMAR	tomRI	tomRU	toMARna	taGID	taGIdi	taGIdu	taGEDna
3rd person	יאמר/ יֹאמַר	תאמר/ תֹאמַר	יאמרו/ יֹאמְרוּ	תאמרנה/ תֹאמַרְנָה	יגיד/ יַגִּיד	תגיד/ תַגִּיד	יגידו/ יַגִּדוּ	תגדנה/ תַגֵּדְנָה
3rd person	yoMAR	toMAR	yomRU	toMARna	yaGID	taGID	yaGIdu	taGEDna
Imperative
2nd person	אמור/ אֱמֹר	אמרי/ אִמְרִי	אמרו/ אִמְרוּ	אמורנה/ אֱמֹרנָה	הגד/ הַגֵּד	הגידי/ הַגִּידִי	הגידו/ הַגִּידוּ	הגדנה/ הַגֵּדְנָה
2nd person	´eMOR	´imRI	´imRU	´eMORna	haGED	haGIdi	haGIdu	haGEDna
Impersonal forms
Prefixed Infinitive	לומר/ לוֹמַר ,לאמור/ לֵאמֹר				להגיד/ לְהַגִּיד			
Prefixed Infinitive	lomar, lemor				lehagid			
Absolute Infinitive	אמור/ אָמוֹר				הגד/ הַגֵּד			
Absolute Infinitive	´aMOR				haGED			
Construct Infinitive	אמור /אֲמֹר				הגיד/ הַגִּיד			
Construct Infinitive	´aMOR				haGID			
Action Noun	—	אמירה/ אֲמִירָה	—	אמירות/ אֲמִירוֹת	—	הגדה/ הַגָּדָה	—	הגדות/ הַגָּדוֹת
Action Noun	—	´amiRA	—	´amiROT	—	hagaDA	—	hagaDOT

=== בא Ba (to come) ===
Irregular pa'al verb with regards to final alef א not causing vowel changes to the stem.

Ba conjugation
בא Ba to come	Singular		Plural	
בא Ba to come	Masculine	Feminine	Masculine	Feminine
Present
All persons	בא/ בָּא	באה/ בָּאָה	באים/ בָּאִים	באות/ בָּאוֹת
All persons	ba	ba´A	ba´IM	ba´OT
Past
1st person	באתי/ בָּאתִי		באנו/ בָּאנוּ	
1st person	BAti		BAnu	
2nd person	באת/ בָּאתָּ	באת/ בָּאתּ	באתם/ בָּאתֶם	באתן/ בָּאתֶן
2nd person	BAta	bat	baTEM	baTEN
3rd person	בא/ בָּא	באה/ בָּאָה	באו/ בָּאוּ	
3rd person	ba	BA´a	BA´u	
Future
1st person	אבוא/ אָבוֹא		נבוא/ נָבוֹא	
1st person	aVO		naVO	
2nd person	תבוא/ תבוֹא	תבואי/ תָבוֹאִי	תבואו/ תָבוֹאוּ	תבואנה/ תָבֹאנָה
2nd person	taVO	taVO´i	taVO´u	taVOna
3rd person	יבוא/ יָבוֹא	תבוא/ תבוֹא	יבואו/ יָבוֹאוּ	תבואנה/ תָבֹאנָה
3rd person	yaVO	taVO	yaVO´u	taVOna
Imperative
2nd person	בוא/ בּוֹא	בואי/ בּוֹאִי	בואו/ בּוֹאוּ	בואנה/ בֹּאנָה
2nd person	bo	BO´i	BO´u	BOna
Impersonal forms
Prefixed Infinitive	לבוא/ לָבוֹא			
Prefixed Infinitive	laVO			
Absolute Infinitive	בוא/ בּוֹא			
Absolute Infinitive	bo			
Construct Infinitive	בוא/ בּוֹא			
Construct Infinitive	bo			
Action Noun	—	ביאה/ בִּיאָה	—	ביאות/ בִּיאוֹת
Action Noun	—	bi´A	—	bi´OT

=== גדל Gadel (to grow) ===
Pa'al verb irregular in the present, action noun, and to a lesser extent in the imperative and future.

Gadel conjugation
גדל Gadel to grow	Singular		Plural	
גדל Gadel to grow	Masculine	Feminine	Masculine	Feminine
Present
All persons	גדל/ גָדֵל	גדלה/ גְדֵלָה	גדלים/ גְדֵלִים	גדלות/ גְדֵלוֹת
All persons	gaDEL	gdeLA	gdeLIM	gdeLOT
Past
1st person	גדלתי/ גָדַלְתִּי		גדלנו/ גָדַלְנוּ	
1st person	gaDALti		gaDALnu	
2nd person	גדלת/ גָדַלְתָּ	גדלת/ גָדַלְתְּ	גדלתם/ גְּדַלְתֶּם	גדלתן/ גְּדַלְתֶּן
2nd person	gaDALta	gaDALT	gdalTEM	gdalTEN
3rd person	גדל/ גָדַל	גדלה/ גָדְלָה	גדלו/ גָדְלוּ	
3rd person	gaDAL	gadLA	gadLU	
Future
1st person	אגדל/ אֶגְדַל		נגדל/ נִגְדַל	
1st person	egDAL		nigDAL	
2nd person	תגדל/ תִגְדַל	תגדלי/ תִגְדְלִי	תגדלו/ תִגְדְלוּ	תגדלנה/ תִגְדַלְנָה
2nd person	tigDAL	tigdeLI	tigdeLU	tigDALna
3rd person	יגדל/ יִגְדַל	תגדל/ תִגְדַל	יגדלו/ יִגְדְלוּ	תגדלנה/ תִגְדַלְנָה
3rd person	yigDAL	tigDAL	yigdeLU	tigDALna
Imperative
2nd person	גדל/ גְדַל	גדלי/ גִדְלִי	גדלו/ גִדְלוּ	גדלנה/ גְדַלְנָה
2nd person	gDAL	gidLI	gidLU	gDALna
Impersonal forms
Prefixed Infinitive	לגדול/ לִגְדּוֹל			
Prefixed Infinitive	ligDOL			
Absolute Infinitive	גדול/ גָּדוֹל			
Absolute Infinitive	gaDOL			
Construct Infinitive	גדול/ גְּדוֹל			
Construct Infinitive	gDOL			
Action Noun	—	גדלה/ גְדֵלָה	—	גדלות/ גְדֵלוֹת
Action Noun	—	gdeLA	—	gdeLOT

=== הלך Halakh (to go, to walk) ===
Pa'al verb irregular in the prefixed infinitive, future tense, and imperative mood.

Halakh conjugation
הלך Halakh to go, to walk	Singular		Plural	
הלך Halakh to go, to walk	Masculine	Feminine	Masculine	Feminine
Present
All persons	הולך/ הוֹלֵך	הולכת/ הוֹלֶכֶת	הולכים/ הוֹלכִים	הולכות/ הוֹלכוֹת
All persons	holekh	holekhet	holkhim	holkhot
Past
1st person	הלכתי/ הָלַכְתִּי		הלכנו/ הָלַכְנוּ	
1st person	halakhti		halakhnu	
2nd person	הלכת/ הָלָכְתָּ	הלכת/ הָלָכְתְּ	הלכתם/ הָלָכְתֶּם	הלכתן/ הָלָכְתֶּן
2nd person	halakhta	halakht	halakhtem	halakhten
3rd person	הלך/ הָלַך	הלכה/ הָלְכָה	הלכו/ הָלְכוּ	
3rd person	halakh	halkha	halkhu	
Future
1st person	אלך/ אֵלֵך		נלך/ נֵלֵך	
1st person	elekh		nelekh	
2nd person	תלך/ תֵלֵך	תלכי/ תֵלְכִי	תלכו/ תֵלְכוּ	תלכנה/ תֵלֵכְנָה
2nd person	telekh	telkhi	telkhu	telekhna
3rd person	ילך/ יֵלֵך	תלך/ תֵלֵך	ילכו/ יֵלְכוּ	תלכנה/ תֵלֵכְנָה
3rd person	yelekh	telekh	yelkhu	telekhna
Imperative
2nd person	לך/ לֵך	לכי/ לְכִי	לכו/ לְכוּ	לכנה/ לֵכְנָה
2nd person	lekh	lekhi	lekhu	lekhna
Impersonal forms
Prefixed Infinitive	ללכת/ לָלֶכֶת			
Prefixed Infinitive	lalekhet			
Absolute Infinitive	הלוך/ הָלֹך			
Absolute Infinitive	halokh			
Construct Infinitive	הלוך/ הֲלֹך			
Construct Infinitive	halokh			
Action Noun	—	הליכה/ הֲלִכָה	—	הליכות/ הֲלִכוֹת
Action Noun	—	halikha	—	halikhot

=== היה Haya (to be) ===
The verb היה is often replaced by the adjective קַיָּם /קיים or the verb הִתְקַיֵּם /התקיים in the present tense.

It is regular in most forms except the present (which is rarely used) and imperative. In addition, the future third person singular has two other irregular forms.

Haya conjugation
היה Haya to be	Singular		Plural	
היה Haya to be	Masculine	Feminine	Masculine	Feminine
Present
All persons	הווה/ הוֹוֶה	הווה/ הוֹוָה	הווים/ הוֹוִים	הוות/ הוֹוֺת
All persons	hove	hova	hovim	hovot
Past
1st person	הייתי/ הָיִיתִי		היינו/ הָיִינוּ	
1st person	hayiti		hayinu	
2nd person	היית/ הָיִיתָ	היית/ הָיִית	הייתם/ הֱיִיתֶם	הייתן/ הֱיִיתֶן
2nd person	hayita	hayit	heyitem	heyiten
3rd person	היה/ הָיָה	הייתה/ הָיְתָה	היו/ הָיוּ	
3rd person	haya	hayta	hayu	
Future
1st person	אהיה/ אֶהְיֶה		נהיה/ נִהְיֶה	
1st person	ehye		nihye	
2nd person	תהיה/ תִהְיֶה	תהיי/ תִּהְיִי	תהיו/ תִהְיוּ	תיהיינה/ תִהְיֶינָה
2nd person	tihye	tihyi	tihyu	tihyeyna
3rd person	יהיה/ יִהְיֶה ,יהא/ יְהֵא	תהיה/ תִהְיֶה ,תהא/ תְהֵא	יהיו/ יִהְיוּ	תהיינה/ תִהְיֶינָה
3rd person	yihye, yehe	tihye, tehe	yihyu	tihyeyna
Imperative
2nd person	היה/ הֱיֶה	היי/ הֱיִי	היו/ הֱיוּ	היינה/ הֱיֶינָה
2nd person	heye	heyi	heyu	heyeyna
Impersonal forms
Prefixed Infinitive	להיות/ לִהְיוֹת			
Prefixed Infinitive	lihyot			
Abstract Infinitive	היה/ הָיֹה			
Abstract Infinitive	hayo			
Construct Infinitive	היות/ הֱיוֹת			
Construct Infinitive	heyot			

=== יכול Yakhol (can, to be able to) ===
Entirely irregular verb with no imperative form. The past tense masculine singular often adds היה haya for disambiguation.

Yakhol conjugation
יכול Yakhol can, to be able to	Singular		Plural	
יכול Yakhol can, to be able to	Masculine	Feminine	Masculine	Feminine
Present
All persons	יכול/ יָכוֹל	יכולה/ יְכוֹלָה	יכולים/ יְכוֹלִים	יכולות/ יְכוֹלוֹת
All persons	yakhol	yekhola	yekholim	yekholot
Past
1st person	יכולתי/ יָכֹלְתִּי		יכולנו/ יָכֹלְנוּ	
1st person	yakholti		yakholnu	
2nd person	יכולת/ יָכֹלְתָּ	יכולת/ יָכֹלְתְּ	יכולתם/ יְכָלְתֶּם	יכולתן/ יְכָלְתֶּן
2nd person	yakholta	yakholt	yekholtem	yekholten
3rd person	היה יכול/ יָכֹל (הָיָה יָכוֹל)	יכלה/ יָכְלָה	יכלו/ יָכְלוּ	
3rd person	(haya) yakhol	yakhla	yakhlu	
Future
1st person	אוכל/ אוּכַל		נוכל/ נוּכַל	
1st person	ukhal		nukhal	
2nd person	תוכל/ תוּכַל	תוכלי/ תוּכְלִי	תוכלו/ תוּכְלוּ	תוכלנה/ תוּכַלְנָה
2nd person	tukhal	tukhli	tukhlu	tukhalna
3rd person	יוכל/ יוּכַל	תוכל/ תוּכַל	יוכלו/ יוּכְלוּ	תוכלנה/ תוּכַלְנָה
3rd person	yukhal	tukhal	yukhlu	tukhalna
Impersonal forms
Prefixed Infinitive	להיות יכול/ לִהיֹת יָכֹל, לוכל/ לוּכַל, ליכול/ לִיכֹל			
Prefixed Infinitive	lihyot yakhol, lukhal, likhol			
Absolute Infinitive	יכול/ יָכֹל yakhol			
Absolute Infinitive	yakhol			
Construct Infinitive	יכול/ יְכֹל yekhol			
Construct Infinitive	yekhol			

=== ישן Yashen (to sleep) ===
Pa'al verb irregular in the present tense and action noun.

Yashen conjugation
ישן Yashen to sleep	Singular		Plural	
ישן Yashen to sleep	Masculine	Feminine	Masculine	Feminine
Present
All persons	ישן/ יָשֵׁן	ישנה/ יְשֵׁנָה	ישנים/ יְשֵׁנִים	ישנות/ יְשֵׁנוֹת
All persons	yashen	yeshena	yeshenim	yeshenot
Past
1st person	ישנתי/ יָשַׁנְתִּי		ישנו/ יָשַׁנּוּ	
1st person	yashanti		yashannu	
2nd person	ישנת/ יָשַׁנְתָּ	ישנת/ יָשַׁנְתְּ	ישנתם/ יְשַׁנְתֶּם	ישנתן/ יְשַׁנְתֶּן
2nd person	yashanta	yashant	yeshantem	yeshanten
3rd person	ישן/ יָשַׁן	ישנה/ יָשְׁנָה	ישנו/ יָשְׁנוּ	
3rd person	yashan	yashna	yashnu	
Future
1st person	אישן/ אִישַׁן		נישן/ נִישַׁן	
1st person	ishan		nishan	
2nd person	תישן/ תִישַׁן	תישני/ תִישְׁנִי	תישנו/ תִישְׁנוּ	תישנה/ תִישַׁנָּה
2nd person	tishan	tishni	tishnu	tishanna
3rd person	יישן/ יִישַׁן	תישן/ תִּישַׁן	יישנו/ יִישְׁנוּ	תישנה/ תִּישַׁנָּה
3rd person	yishan	tishan	yishnu	tishanna
Imperative
2nd person	שן/ שַׁן	שני/ שְׁנִי	שנו/ שְׁנוּ	שנה/ שַׁנָּה
2nd person	shan	shni	shnu	shanna
Impersonal forms
Prefixed Infinitive	לישון/ לִישֹׁן			
Prefixed Infinitive	lishon			
Abstract Infinitive	ישון/ יָשׁוֹן			
Abstract Infinitive	yashon			
Construct Infinitive	ישון/ יְשֹׁן			
Construct Infinitive	yeshon			
Action Noun	—	שינה/ שֵׁינָה	—	שינות/ שֵׁינוֹת
Action Noun	—	sheyna	—	sheynot

=== לקח Laqach (to take) ===
Functions as an initial-n pa'al verb, and has a shortened imperative.

Laqach conjugation
לקח Laqach to take	Singular		Plural	
לקח Laqach to take	Masculine	Feminine	Masculine	Feminine
Present
All persons	לוקח/ לוֹקֵחַ	לוקחת/ לוֹקַחַת	לוקחים/ לוֹקְחִים	לוקחות/ לוֹקְחוֹת
All persons	loqeach	loqachat	loqchim	loqchot
Past
1st person	לקחתי/ לָקַחְתִּי		לקחנו/ לָקַחְנוּ	
1st person	laqachti		laqachnu	
2nd person	לקחת/ לָקַחְתָ	לקחת/ לָקַחְת	לקחתם/ לְקַחְתֶּם	לקחתן/ לְקַחְתֶּן
2nd person	laqachta	laqacht	leqachtem	leqachten
3rd person	לקח/ לָקַח	לקחה/ לָקְחָה	לקחו/ לָקְחוּ laqchu	
3rd person	laqach	laqcha	laqchu	
Past participle	לקוח/ לָקוּחַ	לקוחה/ לְקוּחָה	לקוחים/ לְקוּחִים	לקוחות/ לְקוּחוֹת
Past participle	laquach	lequcha	lequchim	lequchot
Future
1st person	אקח/ אֶּקַּח		ניקח/ נִקַּח	
1st person	eqqach		niqqach	
2nd person	תיקח/ תִקַּח	תיקחי/ תִקְּחִי	תיקחו/ תִקְּחוּ	תיקוחנה/ תִקַּחְנָה
2nd person	tiqqach	tiqqchi	tiqqchu	tiqqachna
3rd person	ייקח/ אִקַּח	תיקח/ תִקַּח	ייקחו/ יִקְּחוּ	תיקוחנה/ תִקַּחְנָה
3rd person	yiqqach	tiqqach	yiqqchu	tiqqachna
Imperative
2nd person	קח/ קַח	קחי/ קְחִי	קחו/ קְחוּ	קחנה/ קַחְנָה
2nd person	qach	qchi	qchu	qachna
Impersonal forms
Prefixed Infinitive	לקחת/ לָקַחַת			
Prefixed Infinitive	laqachat			
Absolute Infinitive	לקוח/ לָקוֹחַ			
Absolute Infinitive	laqoach			
Construct Infinitive	לקוח/ קַחַת			
Construct Infinitive	qachat			
Action Noun	—	לקיחה/ לְקִיחָה	—	לקיחות/ לְקִיחוֹת
Action Noun	—	leqicha	—	leqichot

=== מת Met (to die) ===
Mainly irregular in the present tense and impersonal forms, and has two different action nouns.

Met conjugation
מת Met to die	Singular		Plural	
מת Met to die	Masculine	Feminine	Masculine	Feminine
Present tense
All persons	מת/ מֵת	מתה/ מֵתָה	מתים/ מֵתִים	מתות/ מֵתוֹת
All persons	met	meta	metim	metot
Past tense
1st person	מתי/ מַתִּי		מתנו/ מַתְנוּ	
1st person	matti		matnu	
2nd person	מת/ מַתָּ	מת/ מַתְּ	מתם/ מַתֶּם	מתן/ מַתֶּן
2nd person	matta	matt	mattem	matten
3rd person	מת/ מֵת	מתה/ מֵתָה	מתו/ מֵתוּ	
3rd person	met	meta	metu	
Future tense
1st person	אמות/ אָמוּת		נמות/ נָמוּת	
1st person	amut		namut	
2nd person	תמות/ תָּמוּת	תמותי/ תָּמוּתִי	תמותו/ תָּמוּתוּ	תמותנה/ תָּמֹתְנָה
2nd person	tamut	tamuti	tamutu	tamotna
3rd person	ימות/ יָמוּת	תמות/ תָמוּת	ימותו/ יָמוּתוּ	תמותנה/ תָמֹתְנָה
3rd person	yamut	tamut	yamutu	tamotna
Imperative
2nd person	מות/ מוּת	מותי/ מוּתִי	מותו/ מוּתוּ	מותנה/ מֹתְנָה
2nd person	mut	muti	mutu	motna
Impersonal forms
Prefixed Infinitive	למות/ לָמוּת			
Prefixed Infinitive	lamut			
Absolute Infinitive	מות/ מוֹת			
Absolute Infinitive	mot			
Construct Infinitive	מות/ מוּת			
Construct Infinitive	mut			
Action Noun	—	מוות/ מָוֶת, מיתה/ מִיתָה	—	—
Action Noun	—	mavet, mita	—	—

=== ניגש Nigash (to approach; to get to) ===
Nif'al verb that takes forms from obsolete pa'al נגש nagash in the future, imperative, and infinitive.

Nigash conjugation
ניגש Nigash to approach, to get to	Singular		Plural	
ניגש Nigash to approach, to get to	Masculine	Feminine	Masculine	Feminine
Present
All persons	ניגש/ נִגָּשׁ	ניגשת/ נִגֶּשֶׁת	ניגשים/ נִגָּשִׁים	ניגשים/ נִגָּשׁוֹת
All persons	nigash	nigeshet	nigashim	nigashot
Past
1st person	ניגשתי/ נִגַּשְׁתִּי		ניגשנו/ נִגַּשְׁנוּ	
1st person	nigashti		nigashnu	
2nd person	ניגשת/ נִגַּשְׁתָּ	ניגשת/ נִגַּשְׁתְּ	ניגשתם/ נִגַּשְׁתֶּם	ניגשתן/ נִגַּשְׁתֶּן
2nd person	nigashta	nigasht	nigashtem	nigashten
3rd person	ניגש/ נִגַּשׁ	ניגשה/ נִגְּשָׁה	ניגשו/ נִגְּשׁוּ	
3rd person	nigash	nigsha	nigshu	
Future
1st person	אגש/ אֶגַּשׁ		ניגש/ נִגַּש	
1st person	egash		nigash	
2nd person	תיגש/ תִגַּשׁ	תיגשי/ תִגְּשִׁי	תיגשו/ תִגְּשׁוּ	תיגשנה/ תִגַּשְׁנָה
2nd person	tigash	tigshi	tigshu	tigashna
3rd person	ייגש/ יִגַּשׁ	תיגש/ תִגַּשׁ	ייגשו/ יִגְּשׁוּ	תיגשנה/ תִגַּשְׁנָה
3rd person	yigash	tigash	yigshu	tigashna
Imperative
2nd person	גש/ גָּשׁ	גשי/ גְּשִׂי	גשו/ גְּשׁוּ	גשנה/ גַּשְׁנָה
2nd person	gash	gshi	gshu	gashna
Impersonal forms
Prefixed Infinitive	לגשת/ לָגֶשֶׁת			
Prefixed Infinitive	lageshet			
Absolute Infinitive	נגוש/ נָגֹשׁ			
Absolute Infinitive	nagosh			
Construct Infinitive	נגוש/ נְגֹש			
Construct Infinitive	negosh			

=== נשא Nasa' (to carry, bear) ===
Pa'al verb mainly irregular in the prefixed infinitive and imperative.

Nasa' conjugation
נשא Nasa' to carry, bear	Singular		Plural	
נשא Nasa' to carry, bear	Masculine	Feminine	Masculine	Feminine
Present
All persons	נושא/ נוֹשֵׂא	נושאת/ נוֹשֵׂאת	נושאים/ נוֹשְׂאִים	נושאות/ נוֹשׂאוֹת
All persons	nose	noset	nos'im	nos'ot
Past
1st person	נשאתי/ נָשָׂאּתִי		נשאנו/ נָשָׂאנוּ	
1st person	nasa`ti		nasa`nu	
2nd person	נשאת/ נָשָׂאתָ	נשאת/ נָשָׂאּתְ	נשאתם/ נָשָׂאתֶם	נשאתן/ נָשָׂאתֶן
2nd person	nasata	nasat	nasatem	nasaten
3rd person	נשא/ נָשָׂא	נשאה/ נָשְׂאָה	נשאו/ נָשְׂאוּ	
3rd person	nasa	nas'a	nas`u	
Past participle	נשוא/ נָשׂוּא	נשואה/ נְשׂוּאָה	נשואים/ נְשׂוּאִים	נשואות/ נְשׂוּאוֹת
Past participle	nasu	nesu'a	nesu'im	nesu'ot
Future
1st person	אשא/ אֶשָּׂא		נישא/ נִשָּׂא	
1st person	esa`		nisa`	
2nd person	תישא/ תִשָּׂא	תישאי/ תִשְּׂאִי	תישאו/ תִשְּׂאוּ	תישאנה/ תִשֶׂאנָה
2nd person	tisa	tis'i	tis'u	tisena
3rd person	יישא/ יִשָּׂא	תישא/ תִשָּׂא	יישאו/ יִשְּׂאוּ	תישאנה/ תִשֶׂאנָה
3rd person	yisa	tisa	yis'u	tisena
Imperative
2nd person	שא/ שָׂא	שאי/ שְׂאִי	שאו/ שְׂאוּ	שאנה/ שֶׂאנָה
2nd person	sa	sei	seu	se'na
Impersonal forms
Prefixed Infinitive	לשאת/ לשֵׂאת			
Prefixed Infinitive	laset			
Absolute Infinitive	נשוא/ נָשׂוֹא			
Absolute Infinitive	naso			
Construct Infinitive	נשוא/ נְשׂוֹא			
Construct Infinitive	neso			
Action Noun	—	נשיאה/ נְשִׂיאָה	—	נשיאות/ נְשׂיאוֹת
Action Noun	—	nesia	—	nesiot

=== נתן Natan (to give, to let) ===
Pa'al verb mainly irregular in the prefixed infinitive and imperative.

Natan conjugation
נתן Natan to give, let	Singular		Plural	
נתן Natan to give, let	Masculine	Feminine	Masculine	Feminine
Present
All persons	נותן/ נוֹתֵן	נותנת/ נוֹתֶנֶת	תותנים/ נוֹתְנִים	נותנות/ נוֹתְנוֹת
All persons	noten	notenet	notnim	notnot
Past
1st person	נתתי/ נָתַתִּי		נתנו/ נָתַנּוּ	
1st person	natatti		natannu	
2nd person	נתת/ נָתַתָּ	נתת/ נָתַתְּ	נתתם/ נָתַתֶּם	נתתן/ נָתַתֶּן
2nd person	natatta	natatt	natattem	natatten
3rd person	נתן/ נָתַן	נתנה/ נַתְנָה	נתנו/ נָתְנוּ	
3rd person	natan	natna	natnu	
Past Participle	נתון/ נָתוּן	נתונה/ נְתוּנָה	נתונים/ נְתוּנִים	נתונות/ נְתוּנוֹת
Past Participle	natun	netuna	netunim	netunot
Future
1st person	אתן/ אֶתֵּן		ניתן/ נִתֵּן	
1st person	etten		nitten	
2nd person	תיתן/ תִתֵּן	תיתני/ תִתְּנִי	תיתנו/ תִתְּנוּ	תיתננה/ תִתֵּנְנָה
2nd person	titten	titni	titnu	tittenna
3rd person	ייתן/ יִתֵּן	תיתן/ תִּתֵּן	ייתנו/ יִתְּנוּ	תיתנה/ תִּתֵּנָּה
3rd person	yitten	titten	yitnu	tittenna
Imperative
2nd person	תן/ תֵּן	תני/ תְּנִי	תנו/ תְּנוּ	תנה/ תֵּנָּה
2nd person	ten	tni	tnu	tenna
Impersonal forms
Prefixed Infinitive	לתת/ לָתֵת			
Prefixed Infinitive	latet			
Absolute Infinitive	נתון/ נָתוֹן			
Absolute Infinitive	naton			
Construct Infinitive	תת/ תֵּת			
Construct Infinitive	tet			
Action Noun	—	נתינה/ נְתִינָה	—	נתינות/ נְתִינוֹת
Action Noun	—	netina	—	netinot

=== פחד/פיחד Pachad/Piched (to fear, be afraid of) ===
Similar to amar / higid, this verb is somewhat suppletive, with the forms from פחד pachad mainly being used in the past tense. The synonymous פיחד piched is used elsewhere. פחד Pachad is a regular pa'al verb on the whole, and פיחד piched is a regular pi'el verb.

Pachad/Piched conjugation
to fear, be afraid of	פחד Pachad				פיחד Piched			
to fear, be afraid of	Singular		Plural		Singular		Plural	
to fear, be afraid of	Masculine	Feminine	Masculine	Feminine	Masculine	Feminine	Masculine	Feminine
Present
All persons	פוחד/ פוֹחֵד	פוחדת/ פוֹחֶדֶת	פוחדים/ פוֹחֲדִים	פוחדות/ פוֹחֲדוֹת	מפחד/ מְפָחֵד	מפחדת/ מְפָחֶדֶת	מפחדים/ מְפַחֲדִים	מפחדות/ מְפַחֲדוֹת
All persons	poched	pochedet	pochadim	pochadot	mefached	mefachedet	mefachadim	mefachadot
Past
1st person	פחדתי/ פָחַדְתִּי		פחדנו/ פָחַדְנוּ		פיחדתי/ פִיחַדְתִּי		פיחדנו/ פִיחַדְנוּ	
1st person	pachadti		pachadnu		pichadti		pichadnu	
2nd person	פחדת/ פָחַדְתָּ	פחדת/ פָחַדְתְּ	פחדתם/ פָחַדְתֶּם	פחדתן/ פָחַדְתֶּן	פיחדת/ פִיחַדְתָּ	פיחדת/ פִחַדְתְּ	פיחדתם/ פִיחַדְתֶּם	פיחדתן/ פִיחַדְתֶּן
2nd person	pachadta	pachadet	pachadtem	pachadten	pichadta	pichadet	pichadtem	pichadten
3rd person	פחד/ פָחַד	פחדה/ פַחֲדָה	פחדו/ פַחֲדוּ		פיחד/ פִיחֵד	פיחדה/ פִיחֲדָה	פיחדו/ פִיחֲדוּ	
3rd person	pachad	pachada	pachadu		piched	pichada	pichadu	
Future
1st person	אפחד/ אֶפְחַד		נפחד/ נִפְחַד		אפחד/ אֲפָחֵד		נפחד/ נְפָחֵד	
1st person	efchad		nifchad		afached		nefached	
2nd person	תפחד/ תִפְחַד	תפחדי/ תִפְחֲדִי	תפחדו/ תִפְחֲדוּ	תפחדנה/ תִפְחַדְנָה	תפחד/ תְפָחֵד	תפחדי/ תְפַחֲדִי	תפחדו/ תְפַחֲדוּ	תפחדנה/ תְפָחֵדְנָה
2nd person	tifchad	tifchadi	tifchadu	tifchadna	tefached	tefachadi	tefachadu	tefachedna
3rd person	יפחד/ יִפְחַד	תפחד/ תִפְחַד	יפחדו/ יִפְחֲדוּ	תפחדנה/ תִפְחַדְנָה	יפחד/ יְפָחֵד	תפחד/ תְפָחֵד	יפחדו/ יְפַחֲדוּ	תפחדנה/ תְפָחֵדְנָה
3rd person	yifchad	tifchad	yifchadu	tifchadna	yefached	tepafached	yefachadu	tefachedna
Imperative
2nd person	פחד/ פְחַד	פחדי/ פַחֲדִי	פחדו/ פַחֲדוּ	פחדנה/ פְחַדְנָה	פחד/ פָחֵד	פחדי/ פַחֲדִי	פחדו/ פַחֲדוּ	פחדנה/ פָחֵדְנָה
2nd person	pchad	pachadi	pachadu	pchadna	pached	pachadi	pachadu	pachedna
Impersonal forms
Prefixed Infinitive	לפחוד/ לִפְחֹד				לפחד/ לְפָחֵד			
Prefixed Infinitive	lifchod				lefached			
Absolute Infinitive	פחוד/ פָחֹד				פחד/ פָחֵד			
Absolute Infinitive	pachod				pached			
Construct Infinitive	פחוד/ פְחֹד				פחד/ פָחֵד			
Construct Infinitive	pchod				pached			

=== קטון Katon (to dwindle) ===
Functions like a regular pa'al verb in the past tense and infinitive, and to a lesser extent the future and imperative.

Katon conjugation
קטון Katon to dwindle	Singular		Plural	
קטון Katon to dwindle	Masculine	Feminine	Masculine	Feminine
Present
All persons	קטן/ קָטֵן	קטנה/ קְטֵנָה	קטנים/ קְטֵנִים	קטנות/ קְטֵנוֹת
All persons	katen	ktena	ktenim	ktenot
Past
1st person	קטונתי/ קָטֹנְתִּי		קטונו/ קָטֹנּוּ	
1st person	katonti		katonu	
2nd person	קטונת/ קְטֹנְתָּ	קטונת/ קְטֹנְתְּ	קטונתם/ קְטָנְתֶּם	קטונתן/ קְטָנְתֶּן
2nd person	katonta	katont	ketontem	ketonten
3rd person	קטון/ קָטֹן	קטנה/ קָטְנָה	קטנו/ קָטְנוּ	
3rd person	katon	katna	katnu	
Future
1st person	אקטן/ אֶקְטַן		נקטן/ נִקְטַן	
1st person	ektan		niktan	
2nd person	תקטן/ תִקְטַן	תקטני/ תִקְטְנִי	תקטנו/ תִקְטְנוּ	תקטנה/ תִקְטַנָּה
2nd person	tiktan	tikteni	tiktenu	tiktana
3rd person	יקטן/ יִקְטַן	תקטן/ תִקְטַן	יקטנו/ יקְטְנוּ	תקטנה/ תִקְטַנָּה
3rd person	yiktan	tiktan	yiktenu	tiktana
Imperative
2nd person	קטן/ קְטַן	קטני/ קִטְנִי	קטנו/ קִטְנוּ	קטנה/ קְטַנָּה
2nd person	ktan	kitni	kitnu	ktana
Impersonal forms
Prefixed Infinitive	לקטון/ לִקְטֹן			
Prefixed Infinitive	likton			
Absolute Infinitive	קטון/ קָטֹן			
Absolute Infinitive	katon			
Construct Infinitive	קטון/ קְטֹן			
Construct Infinitive	kton			

== See also ==
- Hebrew grammar
- Prefixes and suffixes in Hebrew
- Waw-consecutive

== Bibliography ==
- Academy Decisions: Grammar, chapter 3, for the Academy of the Hebrew Language's decisions on the conjugations of less common verb patterns
- Gesenius' Hebrew Grammar, §38 ff.
- Ornan, Uzzi (2003). The Final Word: Mechanism for Hebrew Word Generation (in Hebrew). Haifa University.
