= Fakhri =

Fakhri or Fakhry or Fachri is an Arabic given name and surname. Fahri is the Turkish equivalent. Fakhri (in Arabic: فَخْري fakh·riy, fakh·rī, fakh·ry) in the possessive form means "honorary, titulary". It may refer to:

== Fakhri ==
=== Given name ===
- Al-Fakhri Abdullah (died 2015), 52nd Da'i al-Mutlaq of Ismaili Sulaymanis
- Fakhri 'Abd al-Nur (1881–1942), Coptic Egyptian politician
- Fakhri Pasha or Fahreddin Pasha (1868–1948), Turkish Army officer, commander of the Ottoman Army, governor of Medina
- Fakhri A. Bazzaz (1933–2008), Iraqi-American plant ecologist
- Fakhri Husaini (born 1965), Indonesian football manager and coach
- Fakhri Ismail, full name Mohammad Fakhri bin Ismail (born 1991), Bruneian sprinter and footballer
- Fakhri Ismayilov (born 1995), known as Fahree, Azerbaijani singer and songwriter
- Fakhri Kawar (1945–2024), Jordanian writer and parliamentarian
- Fakhri Khorvash (1929–2023), Iranian stage and film actress and director
- Fakhri Odeh (1941–2025), Kuwaiti actor
- Fakhri Al Omari (1936–1991), Palestinian Fatah member
- Fakhri al-Tabaqchali (1900–1985), Iraqi judge, politician, administrator

=== Middle name ===
- Mohsen Fakhri Zadeh or Mohsen Fakhrizadeh (1958–2020), Iranian nuclear physicist and scientist

=== Surname ===
- Ahmed Mahmoud Al-Fakhry (1863–1926), Iraqi writer and poet
- Ikhlas Fakhri (born 1940), Egyptian poet and university teacher
- Jamil Fakhri (1946–2011), Pakistani film, TV and stage artist
- Masood Fakhri (1932–2016), Pakistani footballer
- Mohamed Fakhri (born 1999), Egyptian footballer
- Nargis Fakhri (born 1979), American model and actress
- Nikta Fakhri, Iranian-American physicist
- Parisa Fakhri (born 1975), Iranian American actress and voice actress
- Sabah Fakhri (1933–2021), Syrian singer famous for Muwashahat and Qudoud Halabiyya
- Shams-i Fakhri (fl. 1300–1350), Iranian lexicographer and philologist
- Tobiahs Fakhri (born 1998), Australian producer, singer and songwriter, known professionally as Tobiahs

== Fakhry ==
=== Middle name ===
- Hussein Fakhry Pasha (1843–1920), Egyptian politician, Prime minister of Egypt
- Mohamed Fakhry Abbas (born 1932), Egyptian diver
- Mounir Fakhry Abdel Nour (born 1945), Egyptian businessman and politician

=== Surname ===
- Ahmed Fakhry (1905–1973), Egyptian archaeologist
- Ghida Fakhry, Lebanese-British journalist
- Majid Fakhry (1923–2021), Lebanese scholar of Islamic philosophy and professor emeritus of philosophy
- Omnia Fakhry (born 1982), Egyptian modern pentathlete

== Fachri ==
- Fachri Albar (born 1981), Indonesian actor and musician

== See also ==
- Fahri, the Turkish form of the same name
- Fakhr al-Din or Fakhreddin, a given name and surname
