= Fakhr =

Fakhr, also fakhar or faḵr (Arabic: فخر), is an Arabic word, literally meaning "pride", "honor", "glory". The word may occur as a given name, as part of a given name such as Fakhr al-Din ("pride of the faith"), as part of a kunya, or as a surname. It is also used as a technical term in Arabic literature.

== Literary term ==
In traditional Arabic poetry, fakhr denotes a genre or topos comprising boasting or self-praise, often opening with the exclamation known as wāw rubba. In fakhr passages, a poet may praise his tribe or other group, or the praise may be of an individual, particularly the martial success, magnanimity, and strength of the poet himself. In the qaṣīda form of poetry, personal praise tends to appear in the "travel" (رحيل Arabic pronunciation: [raḥīl]) section; praise of a group tend to appear as the end of the qaṣīda.

== Notable people named Fakhr ==
=== Given name ===
- Fakhr al-Din, multiple people
- Fakhr al-Mulk, multiple people
- Fakhr-un-Nisa, Islamic scholar and calligrapher
- Fakhr-un-Nissa, first child of Mughal Emperor Babur
- Fakhr Fakhr, Lebanese Maronite army officer and politician
- Fakhr Azam Wazir, Pakistani politician
- Fakhar Hussain
- Fakhar Zaman, multiple people

=== Surname ===
- Darvish Fakhr, Iranian American artist
- Fakhr Fakhr, Lebanese Maronite army officer and politician
- Marouane Fakhr, Moroccan footballer
- Sana Fakhar

=== Kunya ===
- Saqr Abu Fakhr, Arab writer living in Lebanon
