= History of Hebrew grammar =

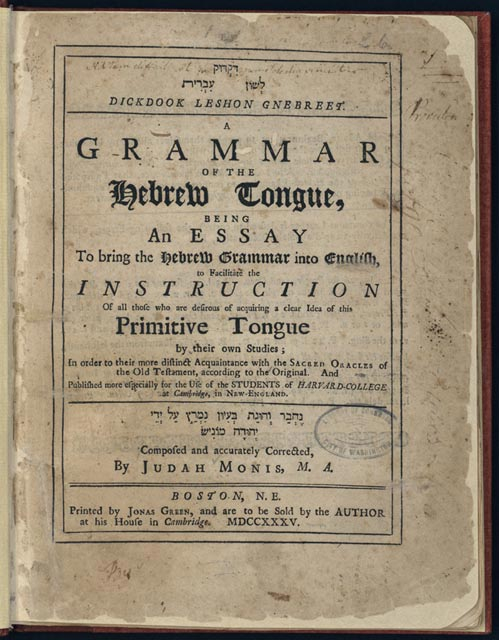
The title page of “A Grammar of the Hebrew Tongue” published in 1735 by Judah Monis

Hebrew grammar is attested from Biblical Hebrew grammar, with reconstructions of pre-Hebrew, and continues with Modern Hebrew grammar.

== History of studies in Hebrew grammar ==
The Masoretes in the 7th to 11th centuries laid the foundation for grammatical analysis of Hebrew. As early as the 9th century Judah ibn Kuraish discussed the relationship between Arabic and Hebrew. In the 10th century, Aaron ben Moses ben Asher refined the Tiberian vocalization, an extinct pronunciation of the Hebrew Bible.

The first treatises on Hebrew grammar appear in the High Middle Ages, in the context of Midrash (a method of interpreting and studying the Hebrew Bible). The Karaite tradition originated in Abbasid Baghdad around the 7th century. The Diqduq (10th century) is one of the earliest grammatical commentaries on the Hebrew Bible.

Solomon ibn Gabirol in the 11th century composed a versified Hebrew grammar, consisting of 400 verses divided into ten parts. In the 12th century, Ibn Barun compared the Hebrew language with Arabic in the Islamic grammatical tradition. 11th to 12th century grammarians of the Golden age of Jewish culture in Spain included Judah ben David Hayyuj, Jonah ibn Janah, Abraham ibn Ezra, Joseph Kimhi, Moses Kimhi and David Kimhi. Ibn Ezra gives a list of the oldest Hebrew grammarians in the introduction to his Moznayim (1140). Profiat Duran published an influential grammar in 1403.

Judah Messer Leon's 1454 grammar is a product of the Italian Renaissance. Hebrew grammars by Christian authors appeared during the Renaissance. Hieronymus Buclidius, a friend of Erasmus, gave more than 20,000 francs to establish a branch of Hebrew studies at Louvain in Flanders. Elijah Levita was called to the chair of Hebrew at the University of Paris. Cardinal Grimani and other dignitaries, both of the state and of the Church, studied Hebrew and the Cabala with Jewish teachers; even the warrior Guido Rangoni attempted the Hebrew language with the aid of Jacob Mantino (1526). Pico de la Mirandola (d. 1494) was the first to collect Hebrew manuscripts, and Reuchlin was the first Christian author to write a vocabulary and short grammar of the Hebrew language (1506). A more detailed grammar was published in 1590 by Otto Walper. Conrad Gesner (d. 1565) was the first Christian to compile a catalogue of Hebrew books. Paul Fagius and Elia Levita operated the first Hebrew printing office in the 1540s. Levita also compiled the first Hebrew-Yiddish dictionary.

Through the influence of Johannes Buxtorf (d. 1629) a serious attempt was made to understand the post-Biblical literature, and many of the most important works were translated into Latin. Gesenius' Hebrew Grammar appeared in 1813.

== Eras ==
The Hebrew language is subdivided by era, with significant differences apparent between the varieties. All varieties, from Biblical to Modern, use a typically Semitic templatic morphology with triconsonantal stems, though Mishnaic and Modern Hebrew have significant borrowed components of the lexicon that do not fit into this pattern. Verbal morphology has remained relatively unchanged, though Mishnaic and Modern Hebrew have lost some modal distinctions of Biblical Hebrew and created others through the use of auxiliary verbs.

Significant syntactic changes have arisen in Modern Hebrew as a result of non-Semitic substrate influences. In particular:

- In Biblical Hebrew, possession is normally expressed with status constructus, a construction in which the possessed noun occurs in a phonologically reduced, "construct" form and is followed by the possessor noun in its normal, "absolute" form. Modern Hebrew tends to reserve this construction for phrases where the two components form a unified concept, whereas ordinary possession is more commonly expressed analytically with the preposition shel 'of' (etymologically consisting of the relativizer she- 'that' and the preposition le- 'to').
- Possession in pronouns is expressed with pronominal suffixes added to the noun. Modern Hebrew tends to reserve this for a limited number of nouns, but usually prefers to use the preposition shel, as in the previous case.
- Biblical Hebrew often expresses a pronoun direct object by appending a pronominal suffix directly to the verb, as an alternative to appending it to the preposition that signals a definite direct object. The latter construction is the one generally used in Modern Hebrew.
- The tense–aspect that is formed by prefixes could denote either the present (especially frequentative) or the future, as well as frequentative past in Biblical Hebrew (some scholars argue that it simply denoted imperfective aspect), while in modern Hebrew it is always future. The suffixed form denotes what is commonly translated as past in both cases, though some scholars argue that it denoted perfective aspect.
- Biblical Hebrew employs the so-called waw consecutive construction, in which the conjunction "and" seemingly reverses the tense of a verb (though its exact meaning is a matter of debate). This is not typical of Modern Hebrew.
- The default word order in Biblical Hebrew is VSO, while Modern Hebrew is SVO.

However, most Biblical Hebrew constructions are still permissible in Modern Hebrew in formal, literary, archaic or poetic style.

== See also ==
- Grammar and Orthography
  - Biblical Hebrew grammar
  - Modern Hebrew grammar
  - Modern Hebrew verb conjugation
  - Prefixes in Hebrew
  - Suffixes in Hebrew
  - Hebrew spelling
  - Biblical Hebrew orthography
- Stages of Hebrew
  - Biblical Hebrew – Attested from 10th century BCE to about 70 CE
  - Mishnaic Hebrew – Post Temple Roman Era (1st through 4th Century CE)
  - Medieval Hebrew – From about the 4th century until the revival of Hebrew in the late 19th and early 20th centuries
  - Modern Hebrew – Early 20th century CE to present
- Other forms of Hebrew
  - Israelian Hebrew – Proposed dialect of Hebrew used by the Northern Israelite tribes in the 1st millennium BCE
  - Samaritan Hebrew – Form of Hebrew used by the Samaritans
- Pronunciation Variation
  - Sephardi Hebrew pronunciation used by Jews of Spain and Portugal
  - Mizrahi Hebrew used by Jews of the Middle East and North Africa
  - Yemenite Hebrew pronunciation (Temani Hebrew) used by Jews of Yemen
  - Ashkenazi Hebrew pronunciation used by Jews of Germany and by Yiddish-speaking Jews
  - Modern Hebrew phonology
- Miscellaneous
  - Yiddish language – a High-German language with Hebrew and Slavic influence, used by Ashkenazi Jews
  - Ladino language – a Spanish language with Hebrew and Aramaic influence, used by Sephardi Jews

== Bibliography ==
Modern Hebrew

- Laufer, Asher (1999), "Hebrew", Handbook of the International Phonetic Association: 96–99
- Bolozky, Shmuel (1996), 501 Hebrew Verbs, Barron's Educational Series, Inc., ISBN 0-8120-9468-9
- Glinert, Lewis (2005), Modern Hebrew: An Essential Grammar (3rd ed.), Routledge UK, ISBN 0-415-70082-5
- Zuckermann, Ghil'ad (March 2006). "A New Vision for Israeli Hebrew: Theoretical and practical implications of analyzing Israel's main language as a semi-engineered Semito-European hybrid language" (PDF). Journal of Modern Jewish Studies. 5 (1): 57–71. doi:10.1080/14725880500511175. S2CID 14682166.
- Arad, Maya (2005). Roots and patterns : Hebrew morpho-syntax. Dordrecht: Springer. ISBN 978-1-4020-3244-8.

Biblical Hebrew

- Waltke, Bruce K.; M. O'Connor (1990), An introduction to Biblical Hebrew Syntax, Eisenbrauns, Winona Lake Indiana, pp. 177–178, ISBN 0-931464-31-5
- Duane A. Garrett and Jason S. DeRouchie, A Modern Grammar for Biblical Hebrew
