= Atayev =

Atayev, Atayew, Ataew or Ataev (masculine; Russian: Атаев) and Atayeva, Atayewa, Ataewa or Ataeva (feminine; Russian: Атaевa) is the surname of the following people:

- Ahmet Ataýew (born 1990), Turkmen football midfielder
- Aksoltan Ataýewa (born 1944), Turkmen diplomat
- Almas Atayev (born 1981), Kazakh judoka
- Artem Atayev (born 1938), Russian physicist
- Bozigit Ataev (born 1979), Russian mixed martial artist
- Fakhraddin Atayev (born 1972), Azerbaijani conductor
- Galina Atayeva (born 1971), Turkmen judoka
- Gurbanmyrat Ataýew (born 1965), Oil and Gas Minister in the Government of Turkmenistan
- Döwletmyrat Ataýew (born 1983), Turkmen player
- Merdan Ataýew (born 1995), Turkmen swimmer
- Muslim Atayev (1973–2005), Chechen Islamist
- Nariman Atayev (born 1971), Uzbek boxer
- Öwezgeldi Ataýew (born 1951), Turkmen politician
- Sabira Ataeva (1917–1993), Turkmen actress
- Serdaraly Ataýew (born 1984), Turkmen football player
- Süleýman Ataýew (born 1996), Turkmen swimmer
