= Nikta =

Nikta (Persian: نیکتا, romanized: Niktâ; also anglicized as Neekta) is a feminine given name of Persian origin meaning 'good one', from نیک (nik 'good') + تا (tâ).

It is notably borne by:

- Nikta Esfandani (2005–2019), a victim of Iran's November 2019 protests
- Nikta Fakhri, Iranian-American physicist
