= Prefixes in Hebrew =

There are several prefixes in the Hebrew language which are appended to regular words to introduce a new meaning. In Hebrew, the letters that form those prefixes are called "formative letters" (Hebrew: אוֹתִיּוֹת הַשִּׁמּוּשׁ, Otiyot HaShimush). Eleven of the twenty-two letters of the Hebrew alphabet are considered Otiyot HaShimush. These letters are Aleph (א), Bet (ב), He (ה), Vav (ו), Yud (י), Kaf (כ), Lamed (ל), Mem (מ), Nun (נ), Shin (ש), and Tav (ת). A mnemonic to remember these letters is איתן משה וכלב (Eitan, Moshe, v'Kalev), which translates to "Ethan, Moses, and Caleb."

== Otiyot HaShimush ==
Prefixes in Hebrew serve multiple purposes. A prefix can serve as a conjunction, preposition, definite article, or interrogative. Prefixes are also used when conjugating verbs in the future tense and for various other purposes.

=== Conjunctions ===
Prefix	Meaning	Comments	Examples
ו (Vav)	and	Vav-conjunctive (cf. Vav-consecutive) can make the "v" sound (/v/) or the "u" sound (/u/). If it is used with other prefixes, this is always the first prefix. In front of פ ,ב ,מ, and sheva, waw (ו) is read as "u" sound, otherwise it is typically pronounced as /ve/.	וְהוּא v'hu (and he); וּבַיוֹם uvayom (and on the day); וּנְהָרוֹת uneharot (and rivers)

=== Inseparable prepositions ===
Prefix	Meaning	Comments	Examples
ל (Lamed)	to, for, onto	The Inseparable Prepositions are pointed: 1. Normally with Sheva.; 2. Before a Sheva they take Chirik.; 3. Before יְ they take Chirik, but the Sheva under the י falls away.; 4. Before a T'nua Chatufa they assume the corresponding short vowel.; 5. Before אֶלֹהִים they take Tzere and the T'nua Chatufa under the א disappears.	1. לְמֶלֶךְ l'melekh (to a king); 2. לִמְלָכִים lim'lokhim (to kings); 3. לִיהוּדָה lihudah (to Judah); 4. לַאֲרִי la'ari (to the lion); 5. לֵאלֹהִים lelohim (to God)
ב (Bet)	in, on, with, by	The Inseparable Prepositions are pointed: 1. Normally with Sheva.; 2. Before a Sheva they take Chirik.; 3. Before יְ they take Chirik, but the Sheva under the י falls away.; 4. Before a T'nua Chatufa they assume the corresponding short vowel.; 5. Before אֶלֹהִים they take Tzere and the T'nua Chatufa under the א disappears.	1. בְּמֶלֶךְ b'melekh (in a king); 2. בִּמְלָכִים bim'lokhim (in kings); 3. בִּיהוּדָה bihudah (in Judah); 4. בַּאֲרִי ba'ari (in a lion); 5. בֵּאלֹהִים belohim (in God)
כ (Kaf)	as, like	The Inseparable Prepositions are pointed: 1. Normally with Sheva.; 2. Before a Sheva they take Chirik.; 3. Before יְ they take Chirik, but the Sheva under the י falls away.; 4. Before a T'nua Chatufa they assume the corresponding short vowel.; 5. Before אֶלֹהִים they take Tzere and the T'nua Chatufa under the א disappears.	1. כְּמֶלֶךְ k'melekh (as a king); 2. כִּמְלָכִים kim'lokhim (as kings); 3. כִּיהוּדָה kihudah (Like Judah); 4. כַּאֲרִי ka'ari (Like a lion); 5. כֵּאלֹהִים kelohim (Like Gods)

=== Other prepositions ===
Prefix	Meaning	Comments	Examples
מ (Mem)	from/of/out of/than	1. Before ordinary letters (excluding the gutturals and ר) it is מִ followed by a Dagesh Chazak.; 2. Before gutturals and ר it is מֵ.; 3. Before the definite article (ה) it is מֵ as in 2, and the article remains intact; or it becomes מִן plus ה.	1. מִמֶּלֶךְ mimelekh (from a king); 2. מֵאָדָם me'adam (from a man); 3. מֵהַמֶּלֶךְ mehamelekh (from the king), or מִן הַמֶּלֶךְ min hamelekh

=== Definite article ===
Prefix	Meaning	Comments	Examples
ה (He)	the	Before ordinary letters (i.e. excluding gutturals and ר) it is הַ followed by a Dagesh Chazak.	הַמֶּלֶךְ hamelekh (the king)
ה (He)	the	Before the weaker gutturals א and ע, as well as ר, it is הָ.	הָאוֹר ha'or (the light); הָעַיִן ha'ayin (the eye); הָרֹאשׁ harosh (the head)
ה (He)	the	Before the harsh gutturals ה and ח it is הַ.	הַהוֹד hahod (the glory); הַחֹשֶׁךְ hachoshekh (the darkness)
ה (He)	the	Before an unaccented הָ and עָ and always before חָ it is הֶ.	הֶהָרִים heharim (the mountains); הֶעָפָר he'afar (the dust); הֶחָכָם hechakham (the wise)
ה (He)	the	Before an accented הָ and עָ it is הָ.	הָהָר hahar (the mountain); הָעָז ha'az (the strong)
ה (He)	the	When used with the Bet, Kaf or Lamed prepositional prefix it is omitted; instead the vowel on the preposition is changed.; If He is used with other prefixes, the He is always the last prefix before the root.	וּבַיוֹם uvayom (and on the day: note that the ve (on) combines with the ha (the) to become va (on the)).

=== Interrogative ===
Prefix	Meaning	Comments	Examples
ה (He)	...?	Used to indicate a question. Can usually be distinguished from the definite article because it is vowelized with a chataf patach	הֲבֵן יַקִּיר לִי? haven yaqir li? (Is he my most precious son?)

=== Conjugation of verbs ===
Prefix	Meaning	Comment	Examples
א (Alef)	I will	When prefixed to a verb stem, indicates first person, singular, future tense. I will.	אֹסָמַךְ 'osamak (I will uphold)
י (Yud)	He/They will	When prefixed to a verb stem, indicates third person, future tense. (Number and gender depend on suffixes.) He will or They will.	יֺסָמַךְ yosamak (he will uphold); יֺסָמַכוּ yosamaku (they will uphold)
נ (Nun)	We will	When prefixed to a verb stem, indicates first person, plural, future tense. We will.	נֺסָמַךְ nosamak (we will uphold)
ת (Tav)	She/You/They will	When prefixed to a verb stem, indicates one of the following: third person, singular, feminine, future tense. She will; second person, future tense. (Number and gender depend on suffixes.) You will; In biblical Hebrew, third person, plural, feminine, future tense. They will	תֹּסָמַךְ tosamak (she/you will uphold); תֹּסָמַכוּ tosamaku (you (pl.) will uphold); תֹּסָמַכנָה שָׂרוֹת tosamakna sarot (the women of the nobility will uphold)

=== Other uses ===
Prefix	Meaning	Comments	Examples
שׁ (Shin)	that, which, who, whom		שֶׁקָּרָה sheqara (which happened); שֶׁעָשׂוּ she'asu (who performed)
ו (Vav)	changes past tense to future tense and vice versa	Used mostly in Biblical Hebrew as vav-consecutive (compare vav-conjunctive). Pronounced "va" when changing future tense to past tense. Usually pronounced "v'" or "u" when changing past tense to future tense.	וַיֹּאמֶר vayomer (and he said); compare yomar (he will say): וְאָהַבְתָּ ve'ahavta (you shall love); compare ahavta (you loved)

== Non Otiyot HaShimush ==
European languages had a large stock of prefixes for technical terminology mostly taken from Greek and Latin. While Hebrew traditionally did not use this kind of prefixes, professionals in the Yishuv who started to teach and work in Hebrew were used to this terminology, and incorporated most of these prefixes into Hebrew. Meanwhile, people working on revitalising the language coined some Hebrew parallels, so today those foreign and Hebrew prefixes are used interchangeably.

Prefix	Origin	Hebrew	Meaning	Examples
ex- אֶקְס־	Latin	-	former	אֶקְסְפּוֹזִיצְיָה eqspozitzya exposition
un-/non- אַנ־/נוֹנ־	English/ Latin	אִי־ i אָל־ al	negation	אִי־אַלִּימוּת i-alimut non-violence; נוֹנְקוֹנְפוֹרְמִיזְם nonqonformizm nonconformism; אָל־מַתֶּכֶת al-matechet nonmetal
in-/il-/im-/ir-	Latin	אִי־ i	not, opposite of	אִירַצְיוֹנָלִי iratzyonali irrational
a- אָ־	Greek	-	lacking in, lack of	אָפּוֹלִיטִי apoliti apolitical; אָ־מִינִי a-mini asexual
prae- פְּרֵ־	Latin	טְרוֹם־ trom קְדַם־ qdam	before	פְּרֵהִיסְטוֹרִי prehistori prehistoric; טְרוֹם־לֵידָתִי terom-ledati (pre-birth/delivery of a baby) prenatal; קְדַם־סוֹקְרָטִית qedam-soqratit Pre-Socratic
post- פּוֹסְט־	Latin	אַחַרְ־ aḥar בָּתַר־ batar	after	בָּתַר־מִקְרָאִי batar-miqra'i post-old-testamental
pro- פְּרוֹ־	Greek	-	for, on the side of	פְּרוֹגְנוֹזָה prognoza prognosis
inter- אִינְטֶר־	Latin	בֵּין־ ben	between, among	אִינְטֶרְנַצְיוֹנָל internatzyonal international; בֵּינְלְאֻמִּי benle'umi international; אִינְטֶרְנֶט internet internet
intra- אִינְטְרָ־	Latin	תּוֹךְ־ tokh פְּנִים־ pnim	inside	אִינְטְרָנֶט intranet intranet
para- פָּרָ־	Greek	-	beside, beyond	פָּרַפְּלֶג parapleg paraplegic
homo- הוֹמוֹ־	Greek	-	same	הוֹמוֹסֶקְסוּאָלִיּוּת homoseqsualiyut homosexuality
hetero- הֵטֵרוֹ־ (often shortened hetro)	Greek	-	different	הֵטֵרוֹסֶקְסוּאָלִיּוּת heteroseqsualiyut heterosexuality
di-/bi- בּי־	Greek/Latin	דּוּ־ du	two	דּוּ־תַּחְמֹצֶת du-tachmotzet (means: di-oxide) dioxide; דּוּ־לְשׁוֹנִי du-leshoni (means: bi-lingual) bilingual; בִּיסֶקְסוּאָל biseksual (means: bi-sexual) bisexual
geo- גֵּאוֹ־	Greek	-	relating to the earth or its surface	גֵּאוֹתֶרְמִי geotermi geothermal
retro- רֶטְרוֹ־	Latin	-	backwards	רֶטְרוֹאַקְטִיבִי retroaqtivi retroactive
semi- סֶמִי־	Latin	דְמוּי־ dmui- חַצִי־ ḥatsi-	half, similar to-	סֶמִיטְרֵיְלֶר semitreyler semitrailer
hemi- הֶמִי־	Greek	חֲצִי־ ḥatsi-	half	הֶמִיסְפֶרָה hemisfera hemisphere; חֲצִי־סְפֶרָה ḥatsi-sfera hemisphere; הַחְלָפַת חֲצִי־מִפרָק haḥlafat ḥatsi mifrak hemi-arthroplasty
electro- אֶלֶקְטְרוֹ־	Greek	-	electric, electricity	אֶלֶקְטְרוֹאֶנְצֶפָלוֹגְרָף eleqtroentzfalograf electroencephalograph (EEG)
anti- אַנְטִי־	Greek	-	opposite	אַנְטִיכְּרִיסְט antikrist Antichrist; אַנְטִי־חֹמֶר anti-chomer antimatter
infra- אִינְפְרָה־	Latin	תַּת־ tat	below, beneath	אִינְפְרָה־אָדֹם infra-adom infrared
mono- מוֹנוֹ־	Greek	חַד־ chad	one, sole, only	מוֹנוֹלוֹג monolog monologue; חַד־לְשׁוֹנִי chad-leshoni monolingual
uni- אוּנִי־	Latin	חַד־ chad	one, whole	חַד־אוֹפַן chad-ofan (lit. uni-wheel) unicycle
poly- פּוֹלִי־	Greek	רַב־ rav	many	פּוֹלִיגַמְיָה poligamya polygamy
multi- מוּלְטִי־	Latin	רַב־ rav	many	מוּלְטִימֶדְיָה multimedya multimedia; רַב־לְשׁוֹנִי rav-leshoni multilingual
tele- טֶלֶ־	Greek	-	at a distance	טֶלֶסְקוֹפּ telesqop telescope
super- סוּפֶּר־	Latin	עַל־ al	over, above, more than, better	סוּפֶּרְנוֹבָה supernova supernova; עַל־טִבְעִי al-tiv'i supernatural
hyper- הִיפֶּר־ (soft i)	Greek	-	extra specially, over, high	הִיפֶּרְאַקְטִיבִי hiperaqtivi hyperactive
tri- טְרִי־ (soft i)	Greek	תְּלַת tlat	three	טְרִיאַתְלוֹן triatlon triathlon; תְּלַת אוֹפַן tlat-Ofan (lit. three-wheel) tricycle
re- רֶ־	Latin	-	again, back	רֶאוֹרְגָּנִיזַצְיָה reorganizatzya reorganization; רֶה־אִרְגּוּן re-irgun reorganization; רֶבִיזְיָה revizya revision
sub- סַאבּ־	Latin	תַּת־ tat	under, lower than, less than	תַּת־מוּדָע tat-muda subconscious
extra- אֶקְסְטְרָ־	Latin	חוּץ־ chutz	outside	חוּץ־תָּאִי chutz-tai extracellular; אֶקְסְטְרָטֶרִיטוֹרְיָאלִי eqstrateritoryali extraterritorial
neo- נֵאוֹ־	Greek	-	new	נֵאוֹלוֹגִיזְם neologizm neologism
proto-	Greek	אָב־ av קְדַם־ qedam	first, original, father	אַבְטִיפּוּס avtipus prototype
socio- סוֹצְיוֹ־ sots'io	French	-	society, social, sociological	סוֹצְיוֹלִינְגְּוִיסְטִיקָה sotzyolingvistiqa sociolinguistics
hydro- הִידְרוֹ־	Greek	-	relating to water, or using water	הִידְרוֹאֶלֶקְטְרִי hidroeleqtri hydroelectric
hypo- הִיפּוֹ־	Greek	-	under or below something, low	הִיפּוֹגְלִיקֶמְיָה hipogliqemya hypoglycemia
iso- אִיזוֹ־/אִיסוֹ־ izo/iso	Greek	-	equal	אִיזוֹטוֹפּ izotop isotope
meta- מֶטָ־	Greek	-	after, along with, beyond, among	מֶטָבּוֹלִיזְם metabolizm metabolism
mega- מֶגָ־	Greek	-	very large, million	מֶגָהֶרְץ megahertz megahertz
micro- מִיקְרוֹ־	Greek	-	minute size, 1/1,000,000	מִיקְרוֹסְקוֹפּ miqrosqop microscope
trans- טְרַנְס־	Latin	-	across	טְרַנְסְאַטְלַנְטִי transatlanti transatlantic
idio- אִידְיוֹ־	Greek	-	individual, personal, unique	אִידְיוֹמָטִי idyomati idiomatic
pyro- פִּירוֹ־	Greek	-	fire	פִּירוֹמֶטֶר pirometer pyrometer; פִּירוֹמָן piroman pyromaniac
re-		שִׁ־ she	again	שִׁכְתוּב shechtuv rewrite
auto- אוֹטוֹ־	Greek	-	self	אוֹטוֹמָטִי otomati automatic

== See also ==
- Affix
- Hebrew grammar
- Hebrew verb conjugation
- Prefix
- Preposition
- Suffixes in Hebrew
