= Fakhr al-Din =

Fakhr al-Din (Arabic: فخر الدين) is an Arabic male given name and (in modern usage) a surname, meaning honor/pride of the religion. Alternative transliterations include Fachreddin, Fakhreddine, Fahrettin, Fakhraddin, Fakhreddin, Fakhreddine, Fakhruddin, Fexredîn, etc.

Notable people with the name include:

== Historical ==
- Fakhruddin As'ad Gurgani, 11th-century Persian poet
- Fakhr al-Din Shaheed, leader of the early Isma'ili movement in India
- Baba Fakruddin, 12th century Iranian-Indian Sufi saint
- Fakhr ad-Din ar-Razi (1149–1209), Persian Sunni Muslim theologian and philosopher
- Fakhr al-Din ibn al-Shaykh (1210–1250), Ayyubid ruler
- Fakhr-al-Din Iraqi (1213–1289), Persian philosopher and mystic
- Fexredîn, a holy figure in Yezidism
- Fakhruddin Mubarak Shah (fl. 1340), King of Bengal
- Abdallah Fakhr al-Din (died 1407), leader of the Tayyibi Isma'ili community
- Fakhr al-Din I (d. 1506), Druze leader in Mount Lebanon
- Fakhr al-Din II (1572–1635), Druze leader in Mount Lebanon
- Ömer Fahrettin Türkkan (1868–1948), Ottoman lieutenant general during World War 1

== Given name ==
- Fakhruddin Ali Ahmed (1905–1977), President of India
- Fakhreddin Shadman (1907–1967), Iranian scholar and politician
- Fakhruddin T. Khorakiwala (c. 1918–2011), Indian businessman
- Fakhruddin G. Ebrahim (1928–2020), Pakistani lawyer
- Fakhraddin Mousavi Naneh Karani (1930–2021), Iranian Cleric & Politician
- Fahrettin Cüreklibatır, known as Cüneyt Arkın (1937–2022), Turkish actor and director
- Fakhruddin Ahmed (born 1940), Bangladeshi economist
- Fakhraddin Manafov (born 1955), Azerbaijani and Soviet actor
- Fakhruddin Ahmadi Danesh-Ashtiani (born 1955), Iranian Politician
- Fahrudin Durak (born 1966), Turkish footballer
- Fakhredin Fouad (born 1967), Jordanian athlete in the high jump
- Fakhraddin Atayev (born 1972), Azerbaijani conductor
- Fakhreddine Galbi (born 1984), Tunisian footballer

== Surname ==
- Syed Mohammad Fakhruddin (1968–1933), Indian politician
- Abdul Rozak Fachruddin (1915–1995), Indonesian Islamic leader
- Mariam Fakhr Eddine (1933–2014), Egyptian actress
- Youssef Fakhr Eddine (1935–2002), Egyptian actor
- Ali Fakhreddine (born 1983), Lebanese basketball player
- Rabih V. Fakhreddine, Lebanese businessman

== See also ==
- Fakhr / Fakhri / Fakhry / Fahri, disambiguation
- Fakhreddine Mosque, in Deir el Qamar, Chouf, Lebanon
- Fakhreddine Palace, in Deir el Qamar, Chouf, Lebanon
- Fakr Ad-Din Mosque, in Mogadishu, Somalia
