= Asiza =

Asiza is an Asian surname. Notable people with the surname include:

- Fahri Asiza (fl. early 21st century), Indonesian novelist and teacher
- Manish Asiza (born 1964), Indian politician

== See also ==
- Aziza (disambiguation)
