= -i =

-i may be:

- A demonymic (nisba) suffix in Arabic
- A demonymic suffix in English
- A pronominal suffix in Hebrew
- The negative imaginary unit (−i), a square root of -1
