= Farhi =

Farhi or Ferhi may refer to:

== Surname ==
- Anna Farhi, Israeli volleyballer
- Daniel Farhi, French liberal rabbi
- Edward Farhi, American theoretical physicist
- Emmanuel Farhi, French-American economist
- Haim Farhi, Turkish chief advisor of Syrian Jewish descent
- Joseph Shabbethai Farhi, Talmudic scholar and kabbalist of the 19th century
- Moris Farhi, Turkish writer
- Naima Farhi, Algerian politician
- Nicole Farhi, French fashion designer

== Similar Surname ==
- Eddy Ferhi, French retired professional ice hockey goaltender
- Ramsey Farchis, Indonesian Tarot Reader

== See also ==
- Fahri
