= National Security Council (Iraq) =

Iraqi National Security Council
- Coat of arms of Iraq

Agency overview
- Formed: 2004
- Agency executives: Ali al-Zaidi, Chairman; Qasim al-Aboudi, National Security Advisor
- Website: https://www.nsa.gov.iq/

The Iraqi National Security Council (INSC) (Arabic: مجلس الأمن الوطني العراقي) is the body in charge of coordinating Iraq's national security, intelligence and foreign policy strategy. It was established in 2004. It is also analogous to the Revolutionary Command Council that existed up until 2003.

== Council powers ==
- Consideration of policies on the security and integrity of the Union, including draft legislation to ensure the achievement of the National Security Strategy.
- Directing the various state agencies to develop their strategies in the interest of national security.
- Establish the necessary mechanisms and procedures for coordination between the various state agencies to achieve national security.
- Work to strengthen the capacity of the state agencies in the face of crises and disasters and ensure the proper management in case of occurrence.
- Supervising the preparation of the strategic plan for national security and its adoption in order to ensure and achieve effective response to threats to national security.
- Supervise the development of a unified information base on the sources of threats, risks and challenges that can face the state.
- To give an opinion on the draft conventions and treaties relating to national security before issuing them.
- Proposing the declaration of martial law and general mobilization.

== Membership ==
The INSC is chaired by the premier.

Iraqi National Security Council
Prime Minister; Chairman	Ali al-Zaidi
National Security Advisor	Qasim al-Aboudi
Minister of Defense	Nayif al-Shammari
Minister of the Interior	Yasir al-Maliki
Minister of Finance	Falih al-Sari
Minister of Foreign Affairs	Fuad Hussein
Minister of Justice	Khaled Shwani
