= Fahrig =

Fahrig is surname. Notable people with the surname include:

- Lenore Fahrig, Canadian academic
- Matthias Fahrig (born 1985), German gymnast
- Stephan Fahrig (1968–2017), German lightweight rower and sports scientist

== See also ==
- Fahri
