= List of awards and honours received by Paul Kagame =

This is a list of awards, honours and other recognitions bestowed on current Rwandan President Paul Kagame.

== List ==
- March 2003 – Global Leadership Award by the Young Presidents' Organization (YPO).
- April 2005 – Kagame was awarded an Honorary Degree of Doctor Laws by the University of the Pacific in the United States.
- September 2005 – Kagame was awarded the Andrew Young Medal for Capitalism and Social Progress by Georgia State University in the United States.
- September 2005 – Kagame was awarded the African National Achievement Award by the Africa-America Institute in the USA.
- April 2006 – Kagame was awarded an Honorary Doctorate by Oklahoma Christian University in the USA.
- May 2006 and July 2007 – ICT Africa Award, for organizations and individuals that have demonstrated excellence in promoting the use of ICTs for the overall development of the African continent.
- August 2007 – Kagame was given the Hands Off Cain Award for his role in ending the death penalty in his country.
- November 2007 – Kagame was awarded an Honorary Degree of Doctor in Law by the University of Glasgow in Scotland.
- December 2007 – Kagame was given the African Gender Award in Dakar, Senegal for his role in promoting gender equality in Rwanda.
- March 2009 – Kagame was awarded "The Distinction of the Grand Cordon in the Most Venerable Order of the Knighthood of Pioneers" by Liberia's President Ellen Johnson-Sirleaf, the highest honour in Liberia.
- June 2009 – Kagame was awarded the Children's Champion Award by the US Fund for UNICEF for Promoting Children's Rights.
- September 2009 – Kagame was awarded the International Peace Medal from Saddleback Church for his support and role in the P.E.A.C.E. plan.
- September 2009 – Kagame honoured with the Clinton Global Citizen Award in recognition of his leadership in public service that has improved the lives of people of Rwanda.
- November 2009 – Kagame was presented with the ‘Most Innovative People Award for Economic Innovation’ at the Lebanon2020 Summit.
- May 2010 – Kagame was awarded 'Lifetime Leadership Award for Development and Equality' by Rwandan Women in recognition of his efforts in developing the nation and promoting equality amongst Rwandans.
- May 2010 – Kagame was awarded the 2010 Rwanda Convention Association (RCA) Award of Excellence in recognition of his role in steering Rwanda towards a knowledge-based economy and promotion of the private sector.
- 5 June 2010 – Kagame was awarded the prestigious 'Energy Globe Award' on the occasion of World Environment Day celebrated in Kinigi, Rwanda.
- 5 July 2010 – Rwanda International Network Association (RINA) awarded Kagame for his continuous efforts in the promotion of Education.
- 27 September 2010 – British Magazine New Statesman included Paul Kagame on the list of "The World's 50 Most Influential Figures 2010" in 49th place.
- 19 November 2010 – Kagame was presented the "Grand Croix – Ordre de merit du Benin" the country's highest national award. The decoration is awarded exclusively to personalities of the rank of Head of State in recognition of outstanding achievement or to express esteem.
- 1 June 2011 – President Kagame was awarded the Chello Foundation Humanitarian Award 2011 for his "outstanding leadership of the Republic of Rwanda since 1994"
- 1 September 2011 – THE International Olympic Committee (IOC) awarded President Paul Kagame with the 2010 IOC award for 'Inspiring Young People' around the world.
- 7 November 2011 – AERG (Association des Etudiants Rescapes du Genocide) awarded Kagame "... in recognition of his efforts and courage to stop the Genocide as he led the Rwanda Patriotic Army,", at the celebration of AERG 15th Anniversary
- April 20, 2012 - Kagame was awarded an Honorary Doctorate of Humane Letters by William Penn University in the USA.
- 18 May 2013 - Oxford African Growth Award was awarded to Kagame by Saïd Business School
