= Fakhr al-Mulk =

Fakhr al-Mulk or Fakhr ul-Mulk (Arabic: فخر الملك, lit. 'Glory of the Realm') is an Arabic honorific title. It can refer to:

- Fakhr al-Mulk (Buyid vizier) (died 1016), vizier of the Buyid emir Baha al-Dawla
- Abu Shuja Muhammad al-Ashraf (died 1073), Fatimid vizier, son of the previous
- Fakhr al-Mulk (Seljuk vizier) (1043–1106), vizier of the Seljuk rulers Berkyaruq and Ahmad Sanjar
- Fakhr al-Mulk Ridwan (1077–1103), Seljuk ruler of Aleppo
- Fakhr al-Mulk ibn Ammar (died 1118/9), last ruling qadi of Tripoli

== See also ==
- Fakhr al-Dawla
- Fakhr al-Din
