= Jamal Baban =

Iraqi politician

Jamal Baban was an Iraqi Kurdish lawyer and politician who held ministerial positions during the monarchy in Iraq, born in 1893 and died in 1965.

== Life ==
He was assigned to occupy the position of Minister of Justice several times. He first held the position in 1930 in the first and second Ministry of Nuri al-Said and then the first and second Ministry of Jameel Al-Madfaai and then the first Ministry of Jawdat al-Ayoubi and then the Ministry of Salih Jabr, where he also held the position of Minister of Economy, then was The Ministry of Mustafa Mahmoud Al-Omari the last ministry in which he holds the position of Minister of Justice, and he also held the position of Minister of Social Affairs in the sixth ministry of Nuri al-Said. He was also elected to the House of Representatives several times.

After the 1958 Iraqi Military Coup, he left Iraq with members of the Baban family, such as Ahmad Mukhtar Baban and Mahmoud Baban, to Lebanon.

His son was a bodyguard for Saddam Hussein.

== Publications ==
- The origins of the names of Iraqi cities and sites
- Ali Kamal Abdul Rahman's notes
