= 1968 Lebanese general election in Akkar District =

Voting to elect four members of the Lebanese parliament took place in the Akkar District (a rural area in northern Lebanon) in 1968, part of the national general election of that year. Two of the seats of the constituency were earmarked for the Sunni Muslim community, one seat for the Greek Orthodox and one for the Maronites (for more information about the Lebanese election system, see Elections in Lebanon). Akkar was the most underdeveloped area of northern Lebanon, politically dominated by landlords. The elections were marred by accusations of vote-buying and minor violent incidents. The constituency had 71,899 eligible voters, out of whom 30,282 voted.

== Candidates ==
There were three tickets with four candidates each as well as two candidates running on individual tickets. The battle stood primarily between the Democratic Front ticket of Bashir al-Uthman and the Suleiman al-Ali, who made a comeback after seven years' absence from active politics (he had been accused of masterminding the murder of a political opponent). The third ticket, of lesser important for the outcome, was formed by three landlords without party affiliation and a post-graduate student of Law.

=== Democratic Front ticket ===
The Democratic Front ticket carried the names of Bashir al-Uthman (Sunni landlord, incumbent parliamentarian), Bahij al-Qaddur (Sunni landlord, incumbent parliamentarian), Jacob Sarraf (Greek Orthodox, former minister) and Fakhr Fakhr (Maronite, retired colonel).

=== Al-Ali ticket ===
Suleiman al-Ali was a Sunni landlord. His running mates were Jawdat al-Ibrahim (another Sunni landlord), Ra'uf Hanna (Greek Orthodox landlord and former parliamentarian) and Mikail ad-Dahir (Maronite, lawyer).

== Results ==
All of the candidates of the Democratic Front ticket were elected.

Candidate	Votes
Bahij al-Qaddur	15,574
Bashir al-Uthman	14,458
Fakhr Fakhr	14,201
Jacob Sarraf	13,777
Suleiman al-Ali	11,795
Jawdat al-Ibrahim	8,603
Abdulkarim Murad	4,727
Muhammed al-Ali	3,733
