= Ministry of Justice (Iraq) =

Government ministry of Iraq

Coordinates: 33°19′51″N 44°23′31″E

Republic of Iraq Ministry of Justice
- وزارة العدل
- Coat of arms of Iraq

Agency overview
- Jurisdiction: Government of Iraq
- Headquarters: Baghdad
- Agency executive: Khaled Shwani, Minister
- Website: Official website

Established in 1920, the Ministry of Justice of Iraq (MoJ) is the federal government ministry concerned with judicial and prosecutorial training, publishing the Official Gazette, notaries public, deeds and records, and since 5 June 2004, prisons. In 2007, the ministry possessed a staff of 13,619. Also, 130 courthouses and headquarters are located at the Ministry of Justice Building.

== List of ministers ==
Sources:

- Naji al-Suwaydi (1920-1922)
- 'Abd al-Muhsin al Sa'dun (1922–1923)
- Ahmed Mahmoud Al-Fakhry (1923-1924)
- Rashid Ali al-Gaylani (1924–1925)
- Daud al-Haidari (1926–1929)
- Abdul Aziz-al-Qassab (1929)
- Jamal Baban (1930–1932)
- Muhammed Zaki (1933)
- Jamal Baban (1933–1934)
- Muhammed Zaki (1935–1936)
- Rashid 'Ali al-Kaylani (1935–1936)
- 'Ali Mahmud al-Shaykh'Ali (1936–1937)
- Salih Jabr (1936–1937)
- Mustafa al-'Umari (1937–1938)
- Mahmud Subhi al-Daftari (1940)
- Naji Shawkat (1940–1941)
- Yunis al-Sab'awi (1941)
- Umar Nadhmi (1941)
- 'Ali Mahmud (1941)
- Ibrahim Kemal (1941)
- Jafar Himandi (1941)
- Sadiq al-Bassam (1941–1942)
- Daud al-Haidari (1942–1943)
- Ahmad Muhktar Baban (1943–1946)
- Muhammed Hasan Kubba (1946)
- Umar Nadhmi (1946–1947)
- Jamal Baban (1947–1948)
- Najib al-Rawi (1948)
- Muhammed Hasan Kubba (1948–1949)
- Hasan Sami Tatar (1950–1952)
- Jamal Baban (1952)
- 'Abd al-Majid al-Qassab (1952–1953)
- Ahmad Mukhtar Baban (1953)
- Jamil al-Urfali (1953–1954)
- Fakhri al-Tabaqchali (1954)
- Muhammed Ali Mahmud (1954)
- Abdul Jabbar al-Tukrali (1955–1957)
- Abdul Rasul al-Khalisi (1957–1958)
- Jamil 'Abd al-Wahhab (1958)
- Mustafa Ali (1958–1961)
- Rashid Mahmud (1961–1962)
- Mahdi al-Dawlai (1963)
- 'Abd al-Sattar 'Ali al-Husayn (1963–1965)
- Muşliḩ an-Naqshbandḯ (1966–1968)
- Mahdi al-Dawlai (1968–1969)
- Aziz Sharif (1969–1972)
- Husayn Muhammed Rida al-Safi (1972–1974)
- Mundhir al-Shawi (1974–1988)
- Akram 'Abd al-Qadir 'Ali (1988-1992)
- Shabib Lazim al-Maliki (1993–2000)
- Mundhir al-Shawi (2000-2003)
- Hashim Abderrahman al-Shibli (2003–2004)
- Malik Dohan al-Hassan (2004–2005)
- Abdel Hussein Shandal (May 3, 2005 – May 20, 2006)
- Hashim Abderrahman al-Shibli (May 20, 2006 – March 31, 2007)
- Safa al-Safi (March 31, 2007 – February 19, 2009) (Acting)
- Dara Nur al-Din (February 19, 2009 – December 21, 2010)
- Hassan al-Shimari (December 21, 2010 – 2016)
- Haidar Al Zamily (2016–2021)
- Khaled Shwani (2022–present)

== Iraqi Correctional Service ==
Iraqi Correctional Service is a sub-agency of the MoJ that is responsible for prisons in Iraq and headed by a Director General (Juma'a Hussein Zamil).

Prior to 2004, various ministries Ministry of the Interior, Ministry of Defence, Ministry of Labour and Social Affairs (juvenile detention facilities) and Kurdish Regional Government were charged with prisons across Iraq.

ICS handles 37,681 prisoners (2009) in various facilities in the country.

== See also ==
- Justice ministry
- Politics of Iraq
- Supreme Court of Iraq
- Supreme Iraqi Criminal Tribunal
