= Muhammed Hassan Kubba =

Former Iraqi minister

Muhammed Hasan Kubba born in 1891 in Baghdad and died in 1964, was an Iraqi politician who held various ministerial positions during the monarchy in Iraq.

== Career ==
He became involved in the Ottoman army in World War I.

He contributed to the founding of the Ja`fari Youth Society in 1919, and most of its members were students from the Ja`fari School, and the house of Abd al-Ghani Kubba was its residence and it included young people including Abd al-Ghani Kubba, Sami Khundeh, Mohammed Hasan Kubba, Sadiq al-Bassam, Sadiq Habbeh, Abd al-Razzaq al-Azari, Raouf al-Bahrani, Abdel Aziz al-Qattan and Ja`far Hamandi and others.

He studied at the Law School in Baghdad.

He held various ministerial positions such as the Minister of Social Affairs and the Minister of Justice, and also served as the president of the Chamber of Deputies in December 1944.
