= Dara Nur al-Din =

Iraqi judge and politician

Dara Nur al-Din is an Iraqi judge and politician who served as the Minister of Justice from February 2008 to December 2010.

A Sunni Kurd, Nur al-Din was a judge who ruled that an edict of Saddam Hussein's government which allowed confiscation of land without proper compensation was unconstitutional. He was sentenced to several years in prison, but only served eight months of his sentence in the Abu Ghraib prison before being released in October 2002.

He was appointed to the Interim Iraq Governing Council created following the United States' 2003 invasion of Iraq.

In February 2008 he was appointed the Minister of Justice in the Al-Maliki government.

== Bibliography ==
- Allam, Hannah (2004). "Iraqi Council Leader Killed." The Philadelphia Inquirer. May 18.
- Hendawi, Hamza (2003). "The big question: Select or elect?" Associated Press. October 1.
