= Waw-conjunctive =

Coordinating conjunction in Hebrew

The conjunctive waw or vav conjunctive (Hebrew: ו' החיבור vav hakhibur) is the coordinating conjunction meaning 'and' in Hebrew, spelled with the letter vav.

It is a proclitic—i.e., although its syntactic distribution is that of an independent word, it is pronounced as a prefix attached to the word following it. In Modern Hebrew, it is typically pronounced /ve/, though a prescriptivist tradition recommends pronouncing it as /u/ when followed by a consonant cluster or labial consonant, maintaining a pattern from the Tiberian pronunciation of Biblical Hebrew.

It is distinct from waw-consecutive, which is the Biblical use of vav as a prefix on verbs.

== Conjunction of two nouns ==
Primarily two nouns may be joined by conjunctive vav without equation, for example Moshe v-Aron ("Moses and Aaron"). Conjunctive vav may however indicate hendiadys where two nouns are equated. An example is found in two examples from Leviticus 25 where the nouns ger "stranger," and toshav "sojourner," are joined by conjunctive waw and usually construed as a hendiadys. However, in Numbers 35:15, each noun is accompanied by the repeated prepositional prefix lo- "to," as in "to-the stranger and (vav) to-the sojourner," which indicates two distinct concepts.

== Conjunction of two verbs ==
Waw-conjunctive may also be used or omitted between two verbs. In imperative sentences such as "sit and wait" the use of the waw between the two verbs is particularly common in maskilic literature, but there are no clear cut semantic considerations regulating the use of vav conjunctive.
