= Suffixes in Hebrew =

There are several suffixes in Hebrew that are appended to regular words to introduce a new meaning. Suffixes are used in the Hebrew language to form plurals of nouns and adjectives, in verb conjugation of grammatical tense, and to indicate possession and direct objects. They are also used for the construct noun form. The letters which form these suffixes (excluding plurals) are called "formative letters" (Hebrew: אוֹתִיּוֹת הַשִּׁמּוּשׁ, Otiyot HaShimush).

== Gender and number ==
Due to noun-adjective agreement rules, these apply to nouns and to adjectival modifiers. In some cases, a masculine plural noun will have a feminine plural suffix and vice versa, but the adjectival modifiers are always the same.

Suffix	Meaning	Examples
ָ ה (Kamatz and he)	feminine singular	סוּסָה susa (mare); סוּסָה טוֹבָה susa tova (good mare)
ִ ים (Chirik, yud and final mem)	masculine plural	סוּסִים susim (horses); סוּסִים טוֹבִים susim tovim (good horses)
וֹת (Cholam and tav)	feminine plural	סוּסוֹת susot (mares); סוּסוֹת טוֹבוֹת susot tovot (good mares)
ַ יִם (Patach, yud with chirik and final mem)	masculine and feminine noun dual form	יָדַיִם yadayim (two hands)

== Construct state ==
Suffix	Meaning	Examples
ַ ת (Patach and tav)	Changes a singular feminine noun to the construct form. of	תּוֹרַת מֹשֶׁה Torat Moshe (Torah of Moses)
ֵ י (Tzere and yud)	Changes a plural masculine noun to the construct form. of	סִפְרֵי קְדֻשָּׁה Sifre q'dusha (Books of holiness)

== Pronominal suffixes ==
=== Singular nouns ===
Suffix	Meaning	Examples
ִ י (Chirik and yud)	First person, singular possessive. My	סוּסִי susi (my horse); תּוֹרָתִי torati (my law)
ְ ךָ (Shva and final khaf with kamatz)	Second person, singular, masculine possessive. Your	סוּסְךָ suskha (your horse); תּוֹרָתְךָ toratkha (your law)
ֵ ךְ (Tzere and final khaf with shva)	Second person, singular, feminine possessive. Your	סוּסֵךְ susekh (your horse); תּוֹרָתֵךְ toratekh (your law)
וֹ ( Cholam male)	Third person, singular, masculine possessive. His	סוּסוֹ suso (his horse); תּוֹרָתוֹ torato (his law)
ָ הּ (Kamatz and he with mappiq)	Third person, singular, feminine possessive. Her	סוּסָהּ susah (her horse); תּוֹרָתָהּ toratah (her law)
ֵ נוּ (Tzere and nun with shuruk)	First person, plural possessive. Our	סוּסֵנוּ susenu (our horse); תּוֹרָתֵנוּ toratenu (our law)
ְ כֶם (Shva, khaf with segol, and final mem)	Second person, plural, masculine possessive. Your	סוּסְכֶם suskhem (your horse); תּוֹרַתְכֶם toratkhem (your law)
ְ כֶן (Shva, khaf with segol and final nun)	Second person, plural, feminine possessive. Your	סוּסְכֶן suskhen (your horse); תּוֹרַתְכֶן toratkhen (your law)
ָ ם (Kamatz and final mem)	Third person, plural, masculine possessive. Their	סוּסָם susam (their horse); תּוֹרָתָם toratam (their law)
ָ ן (Kamatz and final nun)	Third person, plural, feminine possessive. Their	סוּסָן susan (their horse); תּוֹרָתָן toratan (their law)

=== Plural nouns ===
Suffix	Meaning	Examples
ַ י (Patach and yud)	First person, singular possessive. My	סוּסַי susai (my horses); תּוֹרוֹתַי torotai (my laws)
ֶ יךָ (Segol, yud and final khaf with kamatz)	Second person, singular, masculine possessive. Your	סוּסֶיךָ susekha (your horses); תּוֹרוֹתֶיךָ torotekha (your laws)
ַ יִךְ (Patach, yud with chirik, and final khaf with shva)	Second person, singular, feminine possessive. Your	סוּסַיִךְ susayikh (your horses); תּוֹרוֹתַיִךְ torotayikh (your laws)
ָ יו (Kamatz, yud, and vav)	Third person, singular, masculine possessive. His	סוּסָיו susav (his horses); תּוֹרוֹתָיו torotav (his laws)
ֶ יהָ (Segol, yud, and he with kamatz)	Third person, singular, feminine possessive. Her	סוּסֶיהָ suseha (her horses); תּוֹרוֹתֶיהָ toroteha (her laws)
ֵ ינוּ (Tzere, yud, and nun with shuruk)	First person, plural possessive. Our	סוּסֵינוּ suseinu (our horses); תּוֹרוֹתֵינוּ toroteinu (our laws)
ֵ יכֶם (Tzere, yud, khaf with segol, and final mem)	Second person, plural, masculine possessive. Your	סוּסֵיכֶם suseikhem (your horses); תּוֹרוֹתֵיכֶם toroteikhem (your laws)
ֵ יכֶן (Tzere, yud, khaf with segol, and final nun)	Second person, plural, feminine possessive. Your	סוּסֵיכֶן suseikhen (your horses); תּוֹרוֹתֵיכֶן torateikhen (your laws)
ֵ יהֶם (Tzere, yud, he with segol and final mem)	Third person, plural, masculine possessive. Their	סוּסֵיהֶם suseihem (their horses); תּוֹרוֹתֵיהֶם torateihem (their laws)
ֵ יהֶן (Tzere, yud, he with segol, and final nun)	Third person, plural, feminine possessive. Their	סוּסֵיהֶן suseihen (their horses); תּוֹרוֹתֵיהֶן torateihen (their laws)

== Conjugation of verbs ==
=== Qal Perfect ===
Suffix	Meaning	Examples
תִּי (Tav with hiriq male)	1st person sg. I did	שָׁמַרְתִּי shamarti (I kept)
תָּ (Tav with kamatz)	2nd person, masc. sg. You did	שָׁמַרְתָּ shamarta (you kept)
תְּ (Tav with shva)	2nd person, fem. sg. You did	שָׁמַרְתְּ shamart (you kept)
(None, base form)	Qal perfect Did; 3rd person, masc. sg. He did	שָׁמַר shamar (kept/he kept)
ָ ה (Kamatz and he)	3rd person, fem. sg. She did	שָׁמְרָה shamra (she kept)
נוּ (Nun with shuruk)	1st person pl. We did	שָׁמַרְנוּ shamarnu (we kept)
תֶּם (Tav with segol and final mem)	2nd person, masc. pl. You did	שְׁמַרְתֶּם shmartem (you kept)
תֶּן (Tav with segol and final nun)	2nd person, fem. pl. You did	שְׁמַרְתֶּן shmarten (you kept)
וּ (Shuruk)	3rd person pl. They did	שָׁמְרוּ shamru (they kept)

=== Imperfect ===
Suffix	Meaning	Examples
ִי (Chirik male)	Second person, feminine singular. You will do	תִּשְׁמְרִי tishm'ri (you will keep)
וּ (Shuruk)	Third and Second person, masculine plural. They will do, You will do	יִשְׁמְרוּ yishm'ru (they will keep); תִּשְׁמְרוּ tishm'ru (you will keep)
נָה (Nun with kamatz and he)	Third and Second person, feminine plural. They will do, You will do	תִּשְׁמֹרְנָה tishmorna (they will keep); תִּשְׁמֹרְנָה tishmorna (you will keep)

== Imperative ==
Suffix	Meaning	Examples
ִ י (Chirik male)	Feminine singular. do!	שִׁמְרִי shimri (keep!)
וּ (Shuruk)	Masculine plural. do!	שִׁמְרוּ shimru (keep!)
נָה (Nun with Kamatz and He)	Feminine plural. do!	שְׁמֹרְנָה shmorna (keep!)

== Derivative ==
=== Diminutive ===
Suffix	Meaning	Examples
וֹן (Cholam male and final nun)	Diminutive, sometimes masculine	סֵפֶר sefer (book) → סִפְרוֹן sifron (booklet); מַחְשֵׁב machshev (computer) → מַחְשְׁבוֹן machshevon (calculator); מִטְבָּח mitbach (kitchen) → מִטְבָּחוֹן mitbachon (kitchenette)
ֹנֶת (Cholam chaser, nun with segol, and tav)	Diminutive, a feminine version of ־וֹן	יֶלֶד yeled (child, boy) → יַלְדוֹן yaldon (boy (diminutive)) → יַלְדֹּנֶת yaldonet (girl (diminutive)); טִפָּה tippa (drop) → טִפֹּנֶת tipponet (drop (diminutive)); חָמוּד chamud (cute) → חֲמוּדוֹן chamudon (cutie (male)) → חֲמוּדֹנֶת chamudonet (cutie (feminine))
ִ ית (Chirik male and tav)	Diminutive, sometimes feminine	שַׂק saq (sack) → שַׂקִּית saqqit (bag); כַּף kaf (spoon) → כַּפִּית kappit (teaspoon)

=== Abstract nouns ===
Suffix	Meaning	Examples
וּת (Qubbutz and tav)	Abstractive, feminine	נַגָּר nagar (carpenter) → נַגָּרוּת nagarut (carpentry); חָבֵר chaver (friend) → חֲבֵרוּת chaverut (friendship)

=== Collective nouns ===
Suffix	Meaning	Examples
וֹן (Cholam male and final nun)	Collective, masculine	זְכוּת zchut (right) → זְכוּתוֹן zchuton (a collection of rights); מִלָּה mila (word) → מִלּוֹן milon (dictionary (a collection of words))

== Loanwords ==
These suffixes (Hebrew: סוֹפִית sofit) often come from loanwords from English (Latin, Greek, etc...) which are especially prevalent with technical and academic terms.

Suffix	Origin	Hebrew	Meaning	Examples
-graphy	Ladino	גְרַפְיָה- -grafya	field of study; writing	גֵּאוֹגְרַפְיָה geografya (hard g) geography; קָלִיגְרַפְיָה qaligrafya calligraphy
-ic/-ical	Biblical Hebrew/ English	ִי- i	of or pertaining to	נוֹסְטַלְגִּי nostalgi nostalgic; פּוֹלִיטִי politi political; מִיתִי miti mythic(al); מוֹלֶקוּלָרִי molequlari molecular; קַוִּי qavi (means: line-pertaining to) linear
-ian/-an/-ish	Biblical Hebrew/ English	ִי- i	belonging to	רוּסִי rusi Russian; אוּטוֹפִּי utopi utopian; גֶּרְמָנִי germani (hard g) German; בְּרִיטִי briti British; פּוֹלִיטִיקַאי politiqai politician; קוֹמִיקַאי qomiqai comedian
-ism	English	יזְם- -izm	movement; discriminatory belief	לִיבֶּרָלִיזְם liberalizm liberalism; סֶקְסִיזְם seqsizm sexism
-kinesis	Greek	קִינֶזִיס- -qinezis	movement, motion	טֶלֶקִינֶזִיס teleqinezis telekinesis; פְּסִיכוֹקִינֶזִיס psikhoqinezis psychokinesis
-logy (and -ology)	Ladino	לוֹגְיָה- -logya	branch of learning	בִּיוֹלוֹגְיָה biyologya (hard g) biology; טְרִילוֹגְיָה trilogya trilogy
-mania	Greek	מַנְיָה- -manya	obsession	פִּירוֹמַנְיָה piromanya (means: pyro-mania) pyromania; קְלֶפְּטוֹמַנְיָה qleptomanya (means: klepto-mania) kleptomania
-maniac	English	מָן- -man	person with obsession	פִּירוֹמָן piroman (means: pyro-maniac) pyromaniac; קְלֶפְּטוֹמָן qleptoman (means: klepto-maniac) kleptomaniac
-oid	English	וֹאִיד- -oid	similar, but not the same	אַנְדְּרוֹאִיד android android; הוּמָנוֹאִיד humanoid humanoid
-onym	English	וֹנִים- -onim	name	אֶפּוֹנִים eponim eponym; הֶטְרוֹנִים hetronim heteronym
-scope	English	סְקוֹפּ- -sqop	instrument for viewing	טֶלֶסְקוֹפּ telesqop telescope; מיקרוסקופ miqrosqop microscope
-esque	French	ֶסְקָה- -esqa	resembling	בּוּרְלֶסְקָה burlesqa burlesque; הוּמוֹרֶסְקָה humoresqa humoresque; גְּרוֹטֶסְקִי grotesqi grotesque
-y	Ladino	יָה- -ya	having the quality of	קוֹמֶדְיָה qomedya comedy; הִיסְטוֹרְיָה historya history; פִילוֹסוֹפְיָה filosofya philosophy
-meter	English	מֶטֶר- -meter	measuring device; units of measure	בָּרוֹמֶטֶר barometer barometer; קִילוֹמֶטֶר qilometer kilometer
-nik	Yiddish/Russian	נִיק- nik	one connected with	מוֹשַׁבְנִיק moshavniq moshav member/resident; נוּדְנִיק nudniq bothersome person

== See also ==
- Affix
- Hebrew grammar
- Hebrew verb conjugation
- Prefixes in Hebrew
- Preposition
- Suffix
- Dual (grammatical number)
