= Khaled Shwani =

Iraqi Kurdish politician

Khaled Salam Shwani
- خالید سەلام شوانی
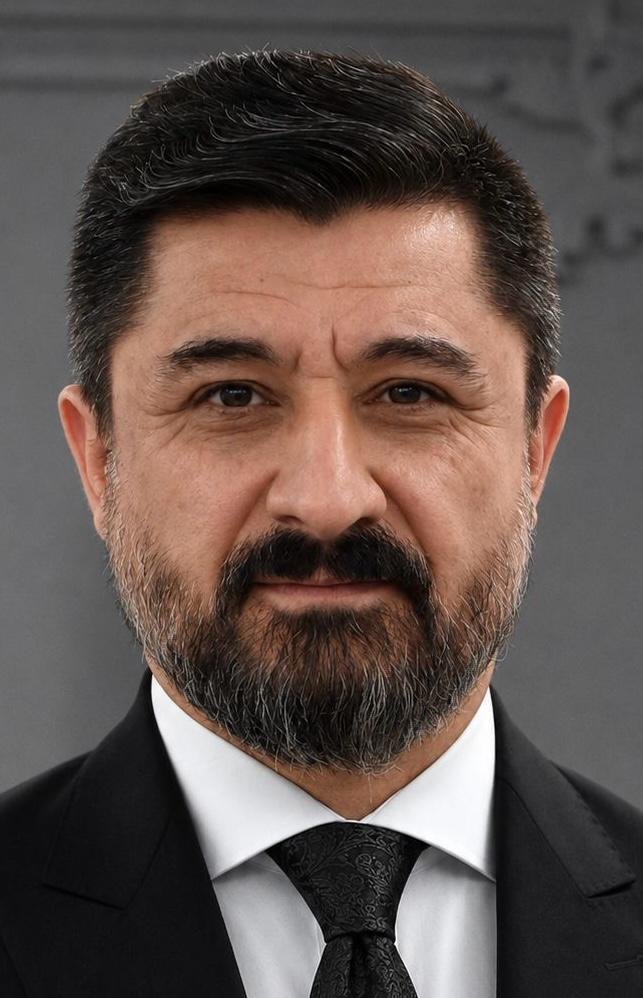

Minister of Justice
- Incumbent
- Assumed office October 27, 2022
- President: Nizar Amidi; Abdul Latif Rashid
- Prime Minister: Ali al-Zaidi; Mohammed Shia' al-Sudani
- Preceded by: Salar Abdul Sattar Muhammad

Member of the Iraqi Council of Representatives
- In office 2006–2010
- Parliamentary group: Patriotic Union of Kurdistan
- Constituency: Kirkuk
- In office 2010–2014
- Parliamentary group: Patriotic Union of Kurdistan
- Constituency: Kirkuk

Personal details
- Born: 1975; Kirkuk, Republic of Iraq
- Party: Patriotic Union of Kurdistan
- Education: University of Baghdad; University of Kirkuk; Mansoura University (PhD)
- Profession: Politician, Lawyer, Legal Scholar

Khalid Salam Saeed Shawani (Kurdish: خالید سەلام سەعید شوانی Arabic: خالد سلام سعيد شواني, romanized: Khālid Sallām Saʻīd Shuwānī) born in 1975 is an Iraqi politician and legal scholar who has served as the Minister of Justice since 2022. He has also held several legislative and executive positions in Iraq and the Kurdistan Region. He is considered one of the leaders of the Patriotic Union of Kurdistan, and served as a member of the Council of Representatives of Iraq for two consecutive terms. He also chaired the parliamentary Legal Committee between 2010 and 2014.

== Early life and education ==
Khalid Shawani was born in the city of Kirkuk in 1975. He obtained a bachelor's degree in law from University of Baghdad, then earned a master's degree in law with distinction from University of Kirkuk. He also received a doctorate in law from Mansoura University.

== Political career ==
Shawani comes from a family affiliated with the Patriotic Union of Kurdistan, and he advanced through the party's organizational ranks. He was elected as a member of the party leadership during its 2010 congress and was re-elected in 2019. In 2022, he became a member of the party's Political Bureau, and in 2026 he assumed responsibility for the Political Bureau of the Patriotic Union of Kurdistan.
