= Ikhlas Fakhri =

Egyptian poet and university teacher

- إخلاص فخري
- Born: 1940 (age 85–86); Al Qalaj, Qalyubia, Egypt
- Occupations: Poet and academic

Ikhlas Fakhri Imarah (born 1940) is an Egyptian poet and university teacher. She was born in the town of Al Qalaj in Qalyubia Governorate, and self-educated, then attended the Dar al-Ulum, Cairo University. She then worked as a professor at Faiyum Branch of Cairo University. Published some poetic collections and historical and critical literary studies.

== Works ==
- As well as men, poetry collection, 1990.
- The Migratory Bird, poetry collection, 1991.
- Pre-Islamic poetry between tribal and subjective study.
- A Critical Reading in Contemporary Arabic Poetry.
- Islam and Poetry 1992
- Nostalgia and alienation in the Mahjar poets
- Shafiq Maalouf's Poetry, PhD Thesis.
- On the art of storytelling
- Crying for the homeland and Arabism
