= Fakhr Fakhr =

Lebanese Maronite army officer and politician

Fakhr Fakhr (Arabic: فخـر فخر) was a Lebanese Maronite army officer and politician. He was born in Anndit, Akkar District. He graduated from Beirut Military Academy. He reached the rank of colonel in the army. After retirement from the army, he contested the Maronite seat in Akkar District in the March 1968 general election. He was elected, having obtained 14,201 votes.

Fakhr belonged to the anti-Kataeb Democratic Parliamentary Front, led by Rachid Karami. After his parliamentary career, he lived in the Achrafieh neighbourhood of Beirut.
