= Fahri =

Fahri is the Turkish spelling of the Arabic name Fakhri, (Arabic: فَخْري fakh·riy, fakh·rī, fakh·ry) in the possessive form meaning "honorary, titulary", both used as a name or surname.

It may refer to:

== Given name ==
- Fahri Asiza, Indonesian novelist and teacher
- Fahri Beqiri (1936–2021), Albanian composer and music professor
- Fahri Hamzah (born 1971), Indonesian politician and former deputy speaker of the Indonesia House of Representatives
- Fahri Kasırga (born 1953), Turkish lawyer and Secretary General of the Presidency of Turkey
- Fahri Korutürk (1903–1987), Turkish navy officer, diplomat and the sixth President of Turkey
- Fahri Sümer (born 1958), Turkish boxer
- Fahri Tatan (born 1983), Turkish footballer
- Fahri Yardım (born 1980), German actor

== Middle name ==
- Mahdi Fahri Albaar (born 1995), Indonesian footballer

== Surname ==
- Hussein Fahri Pasha (1843–1910), prime minister of Egypt
- Jake Fahri, murderer of Jimmy Mizen

== See also ==
- Fakhri / Fakhry, Arabic form of the name
- Farhi
