= Artem Atayev =

Russian physicist (born 1938)

- Артём Ерёмович Атаев
- Born: Artem Eremovich Atayev; November 23, 1938 (age 87)
- Education: Moscow Power Engineering Institute
- Scientific career
- Fields: Condensed matter physics

Artem Eremovich Atayev (Russian: Артём Ерёмович Атаев; born 23 November 1938 is a Soviet/Russian scientist in the field of condensed matter physics.

== Early life ==
Artem Eromovich Atayev was born in 1938. In 1956, he finished school with a gold medal in the city of Samarkand. In 1962 he graduated from the Moscow Power Engineering Institute while simultaneously attending the Faculty of Mechanics and Mathematics at Moscow State University.

In 1970, he defended his thesis on the extraction of electron beams from the mercury arc discharge plasma. In 1984, he defended his doctoral dissertation on the ignition of mercury discharge light sources.

== Career ==
His areas of scientific interests include: light field theory, processes in gas discharges, and multi-functional discharge sources of radiation. He works at the Moscow Power Engineering Institute of the Department of Lighting as a professor. He gives lectures on physical fundamentals of electronic engineering, computer methods for calculating electronic circuits, basics of lighting technology and ion devices.

== Publications ==
- Light vector for axisymmetric with luminance only on the Z coordinate; Light engineering, Volume 4, No.4 1996.
- Investigation of the effect of a hollow cathode for use in lamps of the type DRL (in co-authorship) .- Lighting Engineering, 1978, V 12, p. 20-21.
- Ignition of high-pressure mercury discharge sources. Ed. MEI, 1995
