= Fakhri Kawar =

Jordanian writer and politician (1945–2024)

FAKHRI KAWAR

Fakhri Kawar (Arabic: فخري قعوار, 9 June 1945 – 8 October 2024) was a Jordanian writer and politician.

== Early life ==
Fakhri Kawar was born in the Jordanian town of Al-H4” الاجفور” near the border city of Mafraq in 1945. He was educated in Jerusalem, where he received the General Secondary Education Certificate (Tawjihi) from the Ibrahimieh College in Jerusalem in 1964. He later enrolled in Beirut Arab University to earn a BA in Arabic language and literature in 1971.

== Death ==
He died in Amman on 8 October 2024.

== Career ==
Kawar worked at Yarmouk University in Irbid for many months in the mid-1970s. The Prime Minister at the time, Mudar Badran, dismissed Kawar from his post after the latter published an article entitled "Amman fi el-Qalb" Amman is in the heart" in the Al Ra'i newspaper.

In 1989, he was elected as member of the House of Representatives of Jordan for Amman 3rd district's seat.

Kawar was a member of the Jordanian Journalists Syndicate, the Bulgarian Society for Literature and Satirical Art, the Arab National Forum, the Arab Popular Forces Conference, and the Jordanian Writers Association since it was established in 1974. He was elected chairman of the association for four terms and was the editor-in-chief of the association's Awaraq magazine.

He was also the editor-in-chief of Wisam, a children's magazine, in the mid-1980s. In 1992, Qawar was elected the General Secretary of the Arab Writers Union at a conference in Amman. He was re-elected for the same position in 1995.

== Publications ==
=== Short stories and novels ===
- "Three Voices " (collaboration) 1972.
- "Why Did Suzy Cry So Much?" 1973.
- "Chess is Prohibited" 1976.
- "I am the Patriarch" 1981.
- "The Barrel" 1982, printed three times.
- "Ayyub the Palestinian” 1989.
- "A Night Watchman's Dream" 1993.
- " A Man and a Woman" 1996.
- "Party of the Deaf" (novel) 1996.
- "The Beloved's Path" 1996.
- "The Short Stories" a volume of short story collections 2003.
- “Party of the Deaf”, translated into English in 2005.
- "Complete Works" 2006.
- "The Sun Never Sets" (novel) 2008.
- "The Horse and the Night", a collection of short stories, 2009.
- "Aziz and Aziza", a collection of short stories, 2010.
- "The Dance of Life", a collection of short stories, 2011.

=== Children's literature ===
- "The Turtle and the Children" 1979.
- "From the Colorful Butterfly to the Migratory Birds" (short stories) 1980.
- “Nation of Birds” (play) 1983, performed at the Jerash Festival, in other Jordanian cities, and in some Arab countries.
- "A Conversation with Umaima" 1991.
- "Children's Works" 2010.

=== Satirical literature ===
- "The Diaries of Farhan Farah Saeed" 1982.
- "Notes of my Funeral" 1994.
- "Melody of the Last Return" 1998.
- "The Departed" 2006.
- "Satirical Works" 2007.
- "Day of Laughter", 2009.

=== Essays and studies ===
- "Essays on Art" 1985.
- "Nights of Pleasure" 1990.
- "The Rose Tree" 1997.
- "The Rooster and the Hen" 2006.
- "Her Majesty's Garden" 2006.
- "Dialogues" (a two-part book) 2009.
- "Writings for My Writings" 2011.
- "Literary Follow-ups" 2012.
- "Nazih's Window" 2012.
- "Essays" 2014.
