= Nikta Esfandani =

Iranian child killed in a protest (2005–2019)

- نیکتا اسفندانی
- Died: Star Khan Street Tehran
- Cause of death: bullet to the head

Nikta Esfandani (born on May 22, 2005 in Tehran - died on November 25, 2019, in Tehran) was one of the victims of the 2019–2020 Iranian protests.

== Death ==
Nikta Esfandani was shot dead on November 25, 2019, in Sattar Khan Street, Tehran. At the same time, Nikta's family expressed their hope on her Instagram page that "the spilled blood of their innocent daughter will not go unanswered. "

The body of Nikta Esfandani was buried in Behesht Zahra, Tehran, on 29 November 2019.
