= Ahmed Mahmoud Al-Fakhry =

3rd Iraqi Minister of Justice

Ahmed Mahmoud Al-Fakhry (1863–1926) is an Iraqi writer and poet from Mosul.

He is the son of Al-Sayed Mahmoud, and the grandson of Al-Sayed Muhammad Amin Al-Fakhry. He was born in Mosul and was educated by Abdul-Wahab Al-Jawadi, and was trained in interpreting and speech by him. He then studied under his father, Mahmoud Al-Fakhry, and was trained in the statement and performances.

He was appointed a judge in Mosul in 1918, a Minister of Justice at the Jaafar Al-Askari Ministry and a member of the Constituent Assembly in 1924 until his death.

He has a collection of poetry manuscript in the possession of Hussein Qassem Al-Fakhry, and Mir Basri mentioned that his scattered poetry was collected by the writer Al-Sayyid Ali Al-Alawi; it reached 2420 lines of poetry.
