= Fakhar Zaman =

Fakhar Zaman may refer to:

- Fakhar Zaman (cricketer), Pakistani international cricketer
- Fakhar Zaman (poet), Pakistani Urdu poet
- Fakhar Zaman Khan, Pakistani politician
