= Sabira Ataeva =

- Sabira Ataýewa
- Born: November 7, 1917; Bamy, Ashgabat District, Russian Empire (now Turkmenistan)
- Died: March 18, 1993 (aged 75); Ashgabat, Turkmenistan
- Occupation: Actress

Sabira Ataeva (Turkmen: Sabira Ataýewa, November 7, 1917 – March 18, 1993) was a Turkmen actress of the Soviet period.

== Biography ==
Ataeva was born in the village of Bamy in the Ashgabat District of the Transcaspian Region on November 7, 1917, which also happens to be the day the October Revolution began in Petrograd. today this is the Baharly District of Ahal Province. She was one of several siblings. Their father died when she was young, followed soon thereafter by their mother; as a result, Ataeva was raised in the orphanage in Ashgabat. She was a graduate of the GITIS State Institute of Theatre Arts in Moscow, and beginning in 1941 was on the roster of the Turkmen Drama Theater named after Mollanepes. In 1951 she joined the ranks of the Communist Party of the Soviet Union. Named People's Artist of the Turkmen SSR in 1967, Ataeva became a People's Artist of the USSR in 1981. She also received the Makhtumkuli State Prize from the Turkmen government for her work. She died in Ashgabat. Besides being a stage actress, Ataeva appeared in a number of films during her career, beginning in 1957. A museum dedicated to her life and work is planned for establishment in her native village.
