= Joseph Shabbethai Farhi =

Talmudic scholar and kabbalist

Personal life
- Born: 1802 Jerusalem
- Died: 1882 (aged 79–80) Livorno

Religious life
- Religion: Judaism

Joseph Shabbethai Farhi (1802–1882) was a Talmudic scholar and kabbalist of the 19th century. His most famous work was Oseh Fele, published in 1845.
