= Fakhri al-Tabaqchali =

Former Iraqi minister

Muhammad Fakhri son of Muhammad Nafi son of Muhammad Saeed al-Tabaqchali son of Muhammad Amin Effendi (born 1900 in Baghdad, died 1985), was an Iraqi judge and politician. He held various administrative positions, including the administrator of Basra, and served as a member of the Iraqi Court of Cassation.

== Education and career ==
He studied at the Law School in Baghdad.

He held the position of head of architecture from January 23, 1945, until he was succeeded by Musa Kazem Al Shaker on November 29, 1947. He later served as governor of Basra and also as Mayor of Baghdad, succeeding Abdullah al-Qassab, from April 1, 1953, to April 29, 1954, One of his most notable achievements was laying the foundation stone for the city of Faisal in 1953 in Al-Shamiyya. He was succeeded in this position by Fakhri Al Fakhri. He then served as Minister of Justice in the second Ministry of Arshad al-Omari for the period from April 29, 1954 to June 17, 1954. He also served as Minister of the Interior for four days in 1954.
