= Wāw rubba =

Wāw rubba (Arabic: وَاوُ رُبَّ) is a usage of the Arabic word wa (Arabic: وَ). Whereas the usual use of wa is as a conjunction (meaning 'and'), the wāw rubba is used, particularly in poetry, in an exclamatory fashion to introduce a new subject. In English, it is sometimes known as the 'and of asseveration'.

== Usage ==
Wāw rubba is used to introduce a noun followed by a verb phrase. The noun in such a construction is always in the genitive case. Useful English translations include 'many a...', 'I remember...', 'I think of...', 'Oh, that...!' The construction is often used to mark a transition within a poem.

=== Examples ===
In his muʿallaqa, Imruʾ al-Qays says:

wa-laylin ka-mawji l-baḥri arkhā sudūlahū
ʿalayya bi-anwāʿi l-humūmi li-yabtalī

Many a night, like a wave of the sea, let down its curtains
Upon me to test me with all sorts of cares

This riddle on the touchstone likewise begins with wāw rubba, here rendered simply as 'someone':

wa-mudarraʿin min ṣibghati l-layli burdatan
yufawwafu ṭawran bi-n-nuḍāri wa-yuṭlasú
ʾidhā saʾalū-hu ʿan ʿawīṣayni ʾaškalá
ʾajāba bi-mā ʾaʿyā l-warā wa-huwa khrasú

Someone covered by the fabric of night's (dark) cloak,
once scratched by pure gold, then having it wiped off again.
When people ask him about two inscrutable things which appear so much alike as to cause doubt between them,
his answer transcends the power of humans, but he remains mute nonetheless.

== Origin of name ==
Wāw rubba takes its name from the letter wāw, with which the word wa ('and') is written, and the word rubba (رُبَّ), meaning 'many'; thus the phrase wāw rubba means 'the wāw of many, the wāw equivalent in meaning to rubba'. This name arises from the supposition that the wāw functions like the word rubba, and moreover that this usage originated through phrases like wa-rubba rajulin (وَرُبَّ رَجُلٍ, 'and many a man') from which the word rubba was elided. However, in practice wāw rubba does not necessarily denote a multitude, nor is there evidence for extensive use of the sequence wa-rubba as opposed to rubba appearing on its own. While still conventional, then, the term wāw rubba can be viewed as a misnomer.
