= Rabih V. Fakhreddine =

- ربيع فخر الدين
- Education: American University of Beirut (2006, BBA)
- Occupation: Businessman
- Known for: 7 Management

Rabih V. Fakhreddine (Arabic: ربيع فخر الدين) is a Lebanese businessman. He is known for establishing, 7 Management, a Dubai-based company specializing in hospitality and entertainment.

== Early life and education ==
Fakhreddine was born and raised in Lebanon. He obtained a Bachelor's degree in Business Administration from the American University of Beirut in 2006.

== Career ==
Fakhreddine began his career in sales before joining British American Tobacco, a British multinational company, as the manager of the Hotels, Restaurants, and Cafes (Horeca) division.

In 2015, he founded 7 Management, a company specializing in the development and management of hospitality and entertainment venues in the Middle East. The company operates in Lebanon, the UAE, Qatar, and in Europe, specifically in Greece and Romania.

In September 2020, Fakhreddine received the UAE Golden Visa and settled with his family in Dubai. In 2024, 7 Management was appointed as the operator of Astir Beach in Athens. In December 2024, 7 Management announced its management of the "25 Jump Street" project in collaboration with Ennismore; it is the first licensed street for restaurants and entertainment in Dubai, located in One Central.

Fakhreddine is a board member of the Global Smile Foundation and a member of the Young Presidents' Organization (YPO), UAE chapter.
