= Young Presidents' Organization =

Leadership community

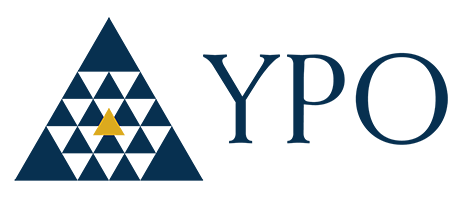
- Abbreviation: YPO
- Formation: 1950; 76 years ago
- Founder: Ray Hickok
- Founded at: Rochester, New York
- Headquarters: Irving, Texas
- Members: Over 38,000
- Subsidiaries: Over 460 individual chapters
- Website: www.ypo.org

YPO (formerly Young Presidents' Organization) is a US-based organization of chief executives with more than 36,000 members in more than 142 countries.

== History ==
YPO was founded in 1950 in Rochester, New York, by manufacturer Ray Hickok, who was 27 years old when he became the head of his family's Rochester-based Hickok Belt, a 300-employee company.

The first meeting was held in 1950 at the Waldorf Astoria New York and was attended by Robert Wood Johnson III (Johnson & Johnson). Hickok and a small group of young presidents in the area began meeting regularly to share and learn from each other. According to the organization, its founding principle is that of education and idea exchange among peers.

- The first non-U.S. chapter was created in 1956 in Ontario, Canada.
- The first YPO University was held in Miami Beach, Florida.
- YPO merged with its graduate organization, World Presidents Organization (WPO), in 2007.
- The YPO Global Pulse survey launched in 2009, and is a quarterly economic confidence index that shares business insights from CEOs.
- In 2010, Jill Belconis became the first woman elected to serve as YPO-WPO international chairman.
- YPO formed an editorial partnership with CNBC in 2012.
- Elizabeth Zucker is the 2019–2020 chairman of the YPO Board of Directors.
- In March 2023 YPO launched a new educational platform for its members called "YPO Leadership Development Toolkit"
- In autumn 2024, YPO was designated as an "undesirable organization" in Russia.

In July 2024, YPO elected Sofyan Almoayed as the 2024-2025 Chairman of its Board of Directors

== Demographics ==
As of 2024, there are more than 450 chapters worldwide and more than 36,000 members.

- 24% of new members are now women from 13% in 2012

== Membership requirements ==
To qualify for membership, a person must have become, before age 45, the president or chairman and chief executive officer of a corporation of significance with:

- Minimum revenue of $15,000,000 for a sales, service, manufacturing company,
- Minimum revenue of $12,000,000 for an agency,
- Minimum revenue $300,000,000 for a financial institution, or
- An enterprise value at a minimum of $25,000,000.

The company must have 50 full time employees or 15+ employees with a minimum $2,500,000 USD annual employee compensation.

The financial criteria differ for service companies and banks. Candidates must be typically recommended by two members of a local chapter and approved by a membership committee of each local chapter. Baseline entry and yearly membership fees are around $10,000 though these can be significantly higher depending on the chapter and other activities.

== Notable members ==
- Mukesh Ambani, chairman and managing director of Reliance Industries and 8th richest person in the world with >$100bn
- Shou Zi Chew, Tiktok CEO
- Leena Nair, CEO of Chanel
- Alejandro Reynal, CEO of FourSeasons
- Jason Liberty, CEO of Royal Caribbean
- Charles R. Schwab, Founder & CEO, Charles Schwab Corporation
- Peter Ueberroth, Chairman, 1984 L.A. Olympic Games, former Commissioner, Major League Baseball
- Bob Galvin, Founder & former CEO, Motorola
- Jim Balsille, Co-Founder & former Co-CEO, Research in Motion/Blackberry
- Douglas Fairbanks Jr., founder of United Artists motion picture studio
- Christie Hefner, former CEO, Playboy Enterprises
- Alex Heckler, Miami attorney
- Ray Lee Hunt, Hunt Oil
- Brad Fuller, Founder and CEO, Lightspeed Voice
- Robert Wood Johnson II, president of Johnson & Johnson
- James Michael Lafferty, Retired CEO Fine Hygienic Holding and former CEO within Procter & Gamble, Coca-Cola and British American Tobacco
- Leonard Lauder, former CEO, Estee Lauder
- Bernard Le Grelle, Founder and former CEO of Interel (merged in 2022 with Dentons)
- Heidi Zak, Founder and CEO, Third Love
- Penny Pritzker, US Secretary of Commerce
- Muna AbuSulayman, Saudi businesswoman, activist and television personality
- Jim Pattison, a Canadian business magnate, investor and philanthropist
- Sheryl Sandberg, COO of Facebook
- Jonathan Zucker, CEO of ActBlue
- Rabih V. Fakhreddine, CEO of 7 Management
- Mohnish Pabrai, Managing Partner Pabrai Investment Funds
- Sheri Roberts, Chairman and CEO of Shell Mauritius Limited and Founder, YPO Global One Chapter
- Asha Saxena, founder of WLDA and Board Member, of YPO Chapter Global One (2012–Present)
- Xavier Mufraggi, former CEO of Club Med EMEA and CEO of YPO since 2020
- William C. Short, Founder, Executive Chairman, and CEO of the A.E. Perkins Holdings Group, former Chairman and Board Member of the YPO North Texas Chapter
- Florian Kemmerich, a Geneva-based German entrepreneur.

== YPO EDGE ==
YPO hosts its leadership gathering, YPO EDGE, each year in a different city. Previous host cities include:

- 2022: New York City
- 2019: Cape Town, South Africa
- 2018: Singapore

== Publications ==
Pat McNees, YPO: The First 50 Years. (Orange Frazer Press, 1999). ISBN 978-1-882203-59-8 OCLC 1011912188

== Controversies ==
In October 2024, the Russian Prosecutor General's Office declared YPO's activities as undesirable within the Russian Federation, alleging that the organization aims to influence public opinion leaders in favor of U.S. interests.
