= Fahri Asiza =

Indonesian novelist and teacher

Fahri Asiza (born Mohammad Fahri), is an Indonesian novelist and teacher.

He has written approximately fifty-two novels; his works include books for children and adults. His best-selling book is Shakila (novel), which sold about 100,000 copies. In 2004 he published Kekasih rembulan.
