= Waw =

Sixth letter of many Semitic alphabets

← He Waw Zayin →
- Phoenician: 𐤅
- Hebrew: ו
- Samaritan: ࠅ
- Aramaic: 𐡅
- Syriac: ܘ
- Nabataean: 𐢈
- Arabic: و
- South Arabian: 𐩥
- Geʽez: ወ
- North Arabian: 𐪅
- Ugaritic: 𐎆
- Phonemic representation: w, v, o, u
- Position in alphabet: 6
- Numerical value: 6

Alphabetic derivatives of the Phoenician
- Greek: Ϝ, Υ
- Latin: F, U, V, W, Y
- Cyrillic: У, Ѵ, Ү, Ԝ

Waw (wāw "hook") is the sixth letter of the Semitic abjads, including Phoenician wāw 𐤅, Aramaic waw 𐡅, Hebrew vav ו, Syriac waw ܘ and Arabic wāw و (sixth in abjadi order; 27th in modern Arabic order). It is also related to the Ancient North Arabian 𐪅, South Arabian 𐩥, and Ge'ez ወ.

It represents the consonant [w] in classical Hebrew, and [v] in modern Hebrew, as well as the vowels [u] and [o]. In text with niqqud, a dot is added to the left or on top of the letter to indicate, respectively, the two vowel pronunciations.

It is the origin of Greek Ϝ (digamma) and Υ (upsilon); Latin F, V and later the derived Y, U, and W; and the also derived Cyrillic У, Ѵ, and other Cyrillic letters.

== Origin ==
In Hebrew, the word וָו vav is used to mean both "hook" and the letter's name (the name is also written וי״ו), while in Syriac and Arabic, waw to mean "hook" has fallen out of use.

== Arabic wāw ==
Wāw واو
- و

Usage
- Writing system: Arabic script
- Type: Abjad
- Language of origin: Arabic language
- Sound values: /w/, /uː/, /oː/
- Alphabetical position: 27

History
- Development: 𐤅: 𐡅; ; و

Other
- Writing direction: Right-to-left

The Arabic letter و is named واو wāw and is written in several ways depending on its position in the word:

Position in word:	Isolated	Final	Medial	Initial
Glyph form: (Help)	و	ـو	ـو	و

Wāw is used to represent four distinct phonetic features:

- A consonant, pronounced as a voiced labial-velar approximant /w/, which is the case whenever it is at the beginning of a word, and sometimes elsewhere.
- A long /uː/. The preceding consonant could either have no diacritic or a short-wāw-vowel mark, damma, to aid in the pronunciation by hinting to the following long vowel.
- A long /oː/ in many dialects, as a result of the monophthongization that the diphthong /aw/ underwent in most of words.
- Part of the sequence /aw/. In this case it has no diacritic, but could be marked with a sukun in some traditions. The preceding consonant could either have no diacritic or have a fatḥa sign, hinting to the first vowel /a/ in the diphthong.

As a vowel, wāw can serve as the carrier of a hamza: ؤ.

Wāw is the sole letter of the common Arabic word wa, the primary conjunction in Arabic, equivalent to "and". In writing, it is prefixed to the following word, sometimes including other conjunctions, such as وَلَكِن wa-lākin, meaning "but". Another function is the "oath", by preceding a noun of great significance to the speaker. It is often literally translatable to "By..." or "I swear to...", and is often used in the Qur'an in this way, and also in the generally fixed construction والله wallāh ("By Allah!" or "I swear to God!"). The word also appears, particularly in classical verse, in the construction known as wāw rubba, to introduce a description.

=== Derived letters ===
Position in word:	Isolated	Final	Medial	Initial
Glyph form: (Help)	ۋ	ـۋ	ـۋ	ۋ

With an additional triple dot diacritic above waw, the letter then named ve is used to represent distinctively the consonant /w/ in Arabic-based Uyghur, Kazakh and Kyrgyz.

Position in word:	Isolated	Final	Medial	Initial
Glyph form: (Help)	ۆ	ـۆ	ـۆ	ۆ

/o/ in Kurdish, Beja, and Kashmiri; /v/ in Arabic-based Kazakh; /ø/ in Uyghur.
Thirty-fourth letter of the Azerbaijani Arabic script, represents ü /y/.

Position in word:	Isolated	Final	Medial	Initial
Glyph form: (Help)	ۉ	ـۉ	ـۉ	ۉ

A variant of Kurdish û وو, ۇ /uː/; historically /o/ for Serbo-Croatian and Uzbek.

Also used in Kyrgyz for Үү /y/.

Position in word:	Isolated	Final	Medial	Initial
Glyph form: (Help)	ۈ	ـۈ	ـۈ	ۈ

/y/ in Uyghur. Also found in Quranic Arabic as in صلۈة ṣalāh "prayer" for an Old Higazi /oː/ merged with /aː/, in modern spelling صلاة.

Position in word:	Isolated	Final	Medial	Initial
Glyph form: (Help)	ۊ	ـۊ	ـۊ	ۊ

/ʉː/ in Southern Kurdish.

Position in word:	Isolated	Final	Medial	Initial
Glyph form: (Help)	ۇ	ـۇ	ـۇ	ۇ

/u/ in Uyghur.

Position in word:	Isolated	Final	Medial	Initial
Glyph form: (Help)	ۏ	ـۏ	ـۏ	ۏ

In Jawi script for /v/. Also used in Balochi for /ɯ/ and /oː/.

=== Other letters ===
See Arabic script in Unicode

== Hebrew waw/vav ==
Orthographic variants
Various print fonts			Cursive Hebrew	Solitreo	Rashi script
Serif	Sans-serif	Monospaced	Cursive Hebrew	Solitreo	Rashi script
ו	ו	ו			

Hebrew spelling: וָו or וָאו or וָיו.

The letter appears with or without a hook on different sans-serif fonts, for example

- Arial, DejaVu Sans, Liberation Sans, Arimo: ו
- Tahoma, Noto Sans Hebrew, Alef, Heebo: ו

=== Pronunciation in modern Hebrew ===
Vav has three orthographic variants, each with a different phonemic value and phonetic realisation:

Variant (with Niqqud)	Without Niqqud	Name	Phonemic value	Phonetic realisation	English example
ו	as initial letter:ו	Consonantal Vav (Hebrew: Vav Itsurit ו׳ עיצורית)	/v/, /w/	[v], [w]	vote wall
ו	as middle letter:וו	Consonantal Vav (Hebrew: Vav Itsurit ו׳ עיצורית)	/v/, /w/	[v], [w]	vote wall
ו	as final letter:ו or יו	Consonantal Vav (Hebrew: Vav Itsurit ו׳ עיצורית)	/v/, /w/	[v], [w]	vote wall
וּ	ו	Vav Shruka ([väv ʃruˈkä] / ו׳ שרוקה) or Shuruq ([ʃuˈruk] / שׁוּרוּק)	/u/	[u]	glue
וֹ	ו	Vav Chaluma ([väv χäluˈmä] / ו׳ חלומה) or Holam Male ([χo̞ˈläm maˈle̞] / חוֹלָם מָלֵא)	/o/	[o̞]	no, noh

In modern Hebrew, the frequency of the usage of vav, out of all the letters, is one of the highest, about 10.00%.

==== Vav as consonant ====
Consonantal vav (ו) generally represents a voiced labiodental fricative (like the English v) in Ashkenazi, European Sephardi, Persian, Caucasian, Italian and modern Israeli Hebrew, and was originally a labial-velar approximant /w/.

In modern Israeli Hebrew, some loanwords, the pronunciation of whose source contains /w/, and their derivations, are pronounced with [w]: ואחד – /ˈwaχad/ (but: ואדי – /ˈvadi/).

Modern Hebrew has no standardized way to distinguish orthographically between [v] and [w]. The pronunciation is determined by prior knowledge or must be derived through context.

Some non standard spellings of the sound [w] are sometimes found in modern Hebrew texts, such as word-initial double-vav: וואללה – /ˈwala/ (word-medial double-vav is both standard and common for both /v/ and /w/, see table above) or, rarely, vav with a geresh: ו׳יליאם – /ˈwiljam/.

==== Vav with a dot on top ====
Vav can be used as a mater lectionis for an o vowel, in which case it is known as a ḥolam male, which in pointed text is marked as vav with a dot above it. It is pronounced [o̞] (phonemically transcribed more simply as /o/).

The distinction is normally ignored, and the HEBREW POINT HOLAM (U+05B9) is used in all cases.

The vowel can be denoted without the vav, as just the dot placed above and to the left of the letter it points, and it is then called ḥolam ḥaser. Some inadequate typefaces do not support the distinction between the ḥolam male ⟨וֹ⟩ /o/, the consonantal vav pointed with a ḥolam ḥaser ⟨וֺ⟩ /vo/ (compare ḥolam male ⟨מַצּוֹת⟩ /maˈtsot/ and consonantal vav-ḥolam ḥaser ⟨מִצְוֺת⟩ /mitsˈvot/). To display a consonantal vav with ḥolam ḥaser correctly, the typeface must either support the vav with the Unicode combining character "HEBREW POINT HOLAM HASER FOR VAV" (U+05BA, HTML Entity (decimal) &#1466;) or the precomposed character וֹ (U+FB4B).

Compare the three:

1. The vav with the combining character HEBREW POINT HOLAM: מִצְוֹת
2. The vav with the combining character HEBREW POINT HOLAM HASER FOR VAV: מִצְוֺת
3. The precomposed character: מִצְוֹת

==== Vav with a dot in the middle ====
Vav can also serve as a mater lectionis for [u], in which case it is termed shuruk and, in text with niqqud, bears a mid-height dot to the left.

Shuruk and vav with a dagesh look identical ("וּ"), but differ with respect to the absence or presence, respectively, of an additional vowel marker. Compare, for instance, שׁוּק /ʃuk/ "(a) market" with שִׁוֵּק /ʃiˈvek/ "to market": in the latter, a zeire (denoting /e/) follows the pointed vav, forcing its interpretation as a geminate consonant. Both cases occur side by side in the word שִׁוּוּק /ʃiˈvuk/ "marketing": the first "וּ" is a consonantal vav with a dagesh, followed by the vowel /u/ in the visually identical form of shuruk.

Unlike other matres lectionis, shuruk can occur word-initially as an allomorph of the vav conjunctive (see below), namely in the context of a subsequent labial or a consonant followed by shva na'. Its pronunciation in this case is /ʔu/.

=== Numerical value ===
Vav in gematria represents the number six, and when used at the beginning of Hebrew years, it means 6000 (i.e. ותשנד in numbers would be the date 6754.)

=== Words written as vav ===
Vav at the beginning of the word has several possible meanings:

- vav conjunctive (Vav Hachibur, literally "the Vav of Connection" — chibur means "joining", or "bringing together") connects two words or parts of a sentence; it is a grammatical conjunction meaning 'and'. It comes at the start of a word, and is written וּ before ב, ו, מ, פ, or a letter with a ְ (Shva), ו with the following letter's Hataf's Niqqud before a letter with a Hataf (for example, וַ before אֲנִי, וָ before חֳדָשִׁים, וֶ before אֱמֶת), וָ sometimes before a stress and וְ in any other case. This is the most common usage.
- vav consecutive (Vav Hahipuch, literally "the Vav of Reversal" — hipuch means "inversion"), mainly biblical, is commonly mistaken for the previous type of vav; it indicates consequence of actions and reverses the tense of the verb following it:
  - when placed in front of a verb in the imperfect tense, it changes the verb to the perfect tense. For example, yomar means 'he will say' and vayomar means 'he said';
  - when placed in front of a verb in the perfect, it changes the verb to the imperfect tense. For example, ahavtah means 'you loved', and ve'ahavtah means 'you will love'.

(Note: Older Hebrew did not have "tense" in a temporal sense, "perfect," and "imperfect" instead denoting aspect of completed or continuing action. Modern Hebrew verbal tenses have developed closer to their Indo-European counterparts, mostly having a temporal quality rather than denoting aspect. As a rule, modern Hebrew does not use the "Vav Consecutive" form.)

- vav explicative

=== Yiddish ===
In Yiddish, the letter (known as vov) is used for several orthographic purposes in native words:

- Alone, a single vov ו represents the vowel [u] in Northern Yiddish (Litvish) or [i] in Southern Yiddish (Poylish and Galitzish).
- The digraph וו, "tsvey vovn" ('two vovs'), represents the consonant [v].
- The digraph וי, consisting of a vov followed by a yud, represents the diphthong [oj] or [ɛɪ].

The single vov may be written with a dot on the left when necessary to avoid ambiguity and distinguish it from other functions of the letter. For example, the word vu 'where' is spelled וווּ, as tsvey vovn followed by a single vov; the single vov indicating [u] is marked with a dot in order to distinguish which of the three vovs represents the vowel. Some texts instead separate the digraph from the single vov with a silent aleph.

Loanwords from Hebrew or Aramaic in Yiddish are spelled as they are in their language of origin.

== Syriac waw ==
Waw
Madnḫaya Waw
Esṭrangela Waw
Serṭo Waw

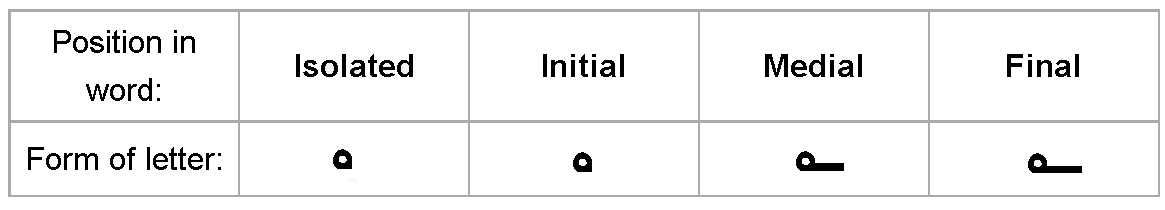

In the Syriac alphabet, the sixth letter is ܘ. Waw (ܘܐܘ) is pronounced [w]. When it is used as a mater lectionis, a waw with a dot above the letter is pronounced [o], and a waw with a dot under the letter is pronounced [u]. Waw has an alphabetic-numeral value of 6.

== Character encodings ==
Character information
Preview	ו		و		ܘ		ࠅ		וּ		וֹ	
Unicode name	HEBREW LETTER VAV		ARABIC LETTER WAW		SYRIAC LETTER WAW		SAMARITAN LETTER BAA		HEBREW LETTER VAV WITH DAGESH		HEBREW LETTER VAV WITH HOLAM	
Encodings	decimal	hex	dec	hex	dec	hex	dec	hex	dec	hex	dec	hex
Unicode	1493	U+05D5	1608	U+0648	1816	U+0718	2053	U+0805	64309	U+FB35	64331	U+FB4B
UTF-8	215 149	D7 95	217 136	D9 88	220 152	DC 98	224 160 133	E0 A0 85	239 172 181	EF AC B5	239 173 139	EF AD 8B
Numeric character reference	&#1493;	&#x5D5;	&#1608;	&#x648;	&#1816;	&#x718;	&#2053;	&#x805;	&#64309;	&#xFB35;	&#64331;	&#xFB4B;

Character information
Preview	𐎆		𐡅		𐤅	
Unicode name	UGARITIC LETTER WO		IMPERIAL ARAMAIC LETTER WAW		PHOENICIAN LETTER WAU	
Encodings	decimal	hex	dec	hex	dec	hex
Unicode	66438	U+10386	67653	U+10845	67845	U+10905
UTF-8	240 144 142 134	F0 90 8E 86	240 144 161 133	F0 90 A1 85	240 144 164 133	F0 90 A4 85
UTF-16	55296 57222	D800 DF86	55298 56389	D802 DC45	55298 56581	D802 DD05
Numeric character reference	&#66438;	&#x10386;	&#67653;	&#x10845;	&#67845;	&#x10905;
