= Nikta Fakhri =

Iranian-American physicist

- Born: Tehran
- Education: Sharif University of Technology; Rice University
- Scientific career
- Workplaces: Georg-August-Universität; Massachusetts Institute of Technology
- Thesis: Single-Walled Carbon Nanotube Dynamics Simple and Complex Media
- Website: Fakhri lab

Nikta Fakhri is an Iranian-American physicist who is a Professor of Physics (formerly the Thomas D. & Virginia W. Cabot Career Development Associate Professor of Physics) at the Massachusetts Institute of Technology. Her research considers non-equilibrium physics in living systems. She was awarded the 2022 American Physical Society Early Career Award for Soft Matter Research.

== Early life and education ==
Fakhri grew up in Tehran, Iran. She was an undergraduate student at the Sharif University of Technology in Tehran.

After completing her bachelor's degree, Fakhri moved to Rice University in Texas, where she studied carbon nanotube dynamics in complex media. Her doctoral research considered the dynamics of single walled carbon nanotubes in water. Specifically, Fakhri has proposed the use of near-infrared fluorescence of carbon nanotubes as independent reporters of cellular systems. Fakhri joined the Georg-August-Universität as a postdoctoral researcher.

== Research and career ==
In 2015, Fakhri joined the faculty at Massachusetts Institute of Technology, where she works in the physics of living systems group. In particular, Fakhri studies the processes in living and non-living matter that create non-equilibrium materials. These materials can display anomalous fluctuations, non-equilibrium phase transitions and unusual rheological properties. For example, Fakhri studied the concentrations of Rho-GTP on the cell membrane of Patiria miniata. By labelling the Rho-GTP in egg cells with a fluorescent protein, Fakhri could study the cell dynamics under the microscope. She showed that protein concentration varied in waves across the protein, forming patterns with two different types of swirling vortices.

== Awards and honors ==
- 2016 Human Frontier Science Program Organization Career Development Award
- 2017 Alfred P. Sloan Research Fellowship
- 2018 Thomas D. and Virginia W. Cabot Professor
- 2018 IUPAP Young Scientist Prize in Biological Physics
- 2019 National Science Foundation CAREER Award
- 2019 Kavli Foundation Frontiers Scholar
- 2022 American Physical Society Early Career Award for Soft Matter Research
- 2026 Fellow of the American Physical Society

== Selected publications ==
- Christopher Battle; Chase P Broedersz; Nikta Fakhri; Veikko F Geyer; Jonathon Howard; Schmidt, Christoph; MacKintosh, Frederick (2016). "Broken detailed balance at mesoscopic scales in active biological systems". Science. 352 (6285): 604–607. doi:10.1126/science.aac8167. PMID 27126047. Wikidata Q46346525.
- Nikta Fakhri; Alok D Wessel; Charlotte Willms; Pasquali, Matteo; Dieter R Klopfenstein; MacKintosh, Frederick; Schmidt, Christoph (2014). "High-resolution mapping of intracellular fluctuations using carbon nanotubes". Science. 344 (6187): 1031–1035. doi:10.1126/science.1250170. PMID 24876498. Wikidata Q50616740.
- Nikta Fakhri; Dmitri A Tsyboulski; Cognet, Laurent; R. Bruce Weisman; Pasquali, Matteo (2009). "Diameter-dependent bending dynamics of single-walled carbon nanotubes in liquids". Proceedings of the National Academy of Sciences of the United States of America. 106 (34): 14219–14223. Bibcode:2009PNAS..10614219F. doi:10.1073/pnas.0904148106. PMC 2732870. PMID 19706503. Wikidata Q30489809.
