= Fakhraddin Atayev =

Azerbaijani composer and arranger

Fakhraddin Atayev Fəxrəddin Atayev
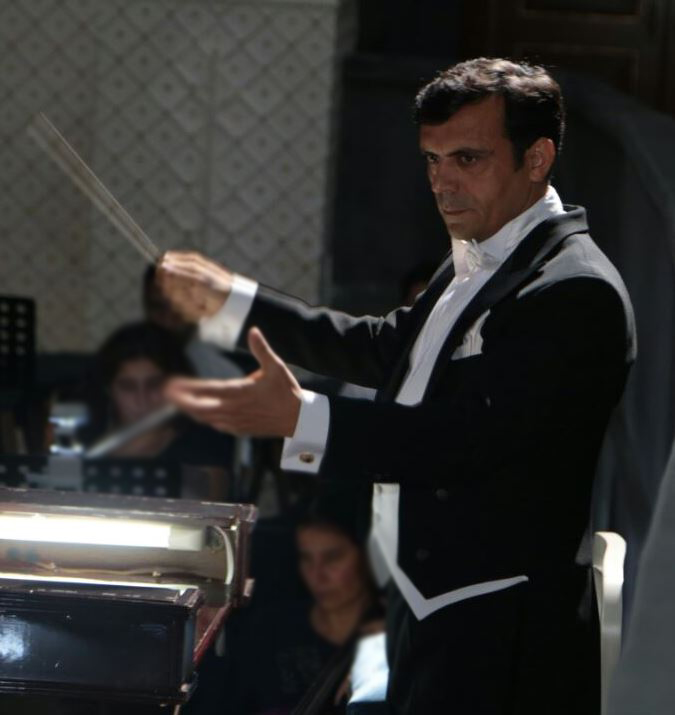
- Fakhraddin Atayev

Background information
- Also known as: Dirijor Fəxrəddin
- Born: 31 January 1972
- Origin: Baku, Azerbaijan
- Occupations: Pedagogue, conductor
- Years active: (1988)

Fakhraddin Gahraman oglu Atayev (Azerbaijani: Fəxrəddin Qəhrəman oğlu Atayev; born 1972) is an Azerbaijani conductor.

== Early life ==
Atayev Fakhraddin Gahraman oglu was born in 1972 in Baku. He began to work in 1988 as a musician in the culture center of the Azerbaijan Organization of Deaf Men. During the years 1990–1992, he was in military service, and he was the head musician of the military orchestra. During the 1993–1999 years, F.Atayev studied at Baku Musical Academy, and he graduated from it with the specialty of "band-master". His specialty teachers were Yusif Akhundzadeh and Yalchin Adigozalov. From 1993 till 1998, he worked as a leader of an orchestra of French horn groups in Azerbaijan State Band-Instruments, and during the 1988–2014 years, he acted as a leader of the same orchestra.

== Works ==
- The orchestra of Azerbaijan State Band-Instruments has taken an important part in state organizations, such as in 2001 at the opening ceremony of the home museum of Liyapold Rastropovich, who was the father of a well-known musician, Mistislav Rastropovich, in 2002 during "The Music day of Uzeyir" the orchestra which accompanied State Capella, performed the overtures of operas "Stand up, nation" and "Koroglu" bu Uzeyir Hajibeyov and "RV-8" march by Muslim Magomayev. Two of the played works were orchestrated for the orchestra by F. Atayev during a short time.
- The orchestra of Azerbaijan State Band-Instruments under the leadership of F.Atayev takes part in many organizations, such as the Ganja City Days, from 2005 every year in the opening and closing days of the education year in the New Education Complex named after H.Aliyev, every year on 9 May in remembered ceremony in the "Gardashlig" cemetery placed in the Narimanov region, in opening days of theatre season, in popular organizations during Novruz holiday, in final parties at the Academy of Diplomacy, in opening ceremonies of International Book Exhibition, in the holiday "Uzum" ("Grape") organized in Icharisheher and telecasted by television "Ictimai". Many of the workes in the repertoire of the orchestra were orchestrated by F. Atayev.
- During 1999–2004, F. Atayev worked as a leader of the orchestra of State Dance ensemble of Azerbaijan State Philharmonic Society named after M. Magomayev. He was also a participant of many state organizations and the concert dedicated to the thirty jubilee of State Dance ensemble.
- In 1999 his debut was with the opera "Ashug Garib" by U. Hajibeyov in Azerbaijan State Opera and Ballet Teatre. During 2000–2004 years he worked as a leader of symphonic orchestra of Azerbaijan State Opera and Ballet Teatre.
- From 2004 F.Atayev leads the class of orchestra in the department of "Profession of the conductor" at Azerbaijan National Conservatory. He is a head-teacher of the conservatory. He is the author of the methodical works and training aids about the subjects of conductor and symphonic orchestra instruments. The scientific articles about music-study and folklore-study are published periodically in some journals such as "Herbi bilik" ("Military knowledge"), "Tedgigler" ("Investigations"), "Gobustan", "Dede Gorgud" etc. He is also a participant of the international conferences.
- For the first time, F. Agayev proposed a suggestion to create the orchestra of "National Wind Instruments" and organized an orchestra with twenty one performers of national wind instruments attached to National Conservatory and presented the concert programme. In 2015 Atayev F. organized a flash mob with the small staff of the student orchestra of the National Conservatory support of the Fund of Youth near President of Azerbaijan Republic according to the jubilee anniversary of Uzeyir Hajibeyli -130. In Baku Metropolitan in 2016 he created "The student national chamber chorus" attached to the National Conservatory, and on 24 May in 2016 the concert program was held.
- From 2008 he works as a leader of a symphonic orchestra named after "Niyazi" of the closed shareholder organization of Azerbaijan State Television and Radio. During these years he participated as a leader in the notation of symphonic and chorus works of many composers of Azerbaijan and foreign countries.
- From 2009, F. Atayev worked as a chorus leader in the collective of chorus of State Music and Dance Ensemble of the Azerbaijan State Philharmonic Society named after F. Amirov. During these years he renewed the dozens of folk and composer songs of the repertory of the collective. In 2010 F. Atayev wrote the scenario of the concert- spectacle "Novruz" and prepared it together with the collective of State Music and Dance Ensemble of the Azerbaijan State Philharmonic Society named after F. Amirov. From 2009 F. Agayev has worked as a band-master of symphonic orchestra in Azerbaijan State Music Theatre.
- During his working years Atayev F. was the conductor of some spectacles such as "Arshin mal alan", "O olmasin bu olsun", "Husband and wife" by U. Hajibeyli, "Neighbors" ("Gonshular") *by R.Hajiyev, "Tricksters" ("Kelekbazlar"), "Everyone’s own star" ("Herenin oz ulduzu") by S. Alasgarov "The gold wedding" *. by O.Kazimi, "Bankir adakhli" ("Banker betrothed") and "Girmizi papag" ("The red cap") by E.Sabitoglu, "Gisganj urekler" ("The jealous hearts") by R. Mirishli, "Elin jibinde olsun" ("Let your hand be in your pocket") by O.Rajabov, "Iddiali Garachi" ("The pretentious gipsy") by I.Kalma etc. On 10 March 2016, he was the stage manager and conductor of the musical comedy "Baladadash’s wedding bath" prepared on the base of the work by the national writer Elchin (composer is Firudin Allahverdi, the stage manager producer is the national actor Jannat Salimova . Besides it with the order of Azerbaijan State Musical theatre Fakhraddin Atayev prepared F.Amirov's music and songs ("I’ll look for you", "Rayhan", "The wedding song", "The night passed", "What have I done?") or the symphony orchestra of the spectacle "The 999th night" prepared on the base of the tale "The 1000th night" (the stage manager producer is Irada Gozalova, the stage manager conductor is Fakhraddin Atayev) , . Both of the spectacles have been elected as "The best spectacle of the season" of the 106th season of Azerbaijan State Musical Theatre.

Besides F.Atayev has worked the songs ("Seni araram", "Reyhan", "Toy", "Geje kechdi", "Neylemishem", etc.) by F.Amirov for symphonic orchestra of a new spectacle prepared on the base of the tale "1001 geje" with the order of Azerbaijan State Musical Theatre.

== Rewards ==
- He was also a participant as a composer of some competitions. In 1996 F. Atayev was the 3rd rewarder of the best "According to the patriotism march" competition organized by Azerbaijan Radio and Television Closed Shareholder Organization, in 2004 he was also honoured with the name of diplomat of the "Golden march" competition organized by ANS group of companies and the fund of National Hero Chingiz Mustafayev.
- In 2007 F. Atayev wrote the overture ballade "Olympiad" for symphonic orchestra, chorus and soloists. The work was intended to be performed during popular choreographic, sport spectacles and it was presented to the National Olympiad Committee of Azerbaijan Republic and the affirmative reference has been obtained. F. Atayev was rewarded with a special certificate signed by the president of the committee on 26 December 2007.
- According to the results of 2011–2012, the spectacle "Wedding" by Gogol presented at Musical Comedy Theatre was awarded with the prize "Zirve" established by the Ministry of Culture and Tourism. The band-master was F. Agayev.
- On 22 September in 2016 according to the command of the Azerbaijani president about giving the honorary titles to the members of Azerbaijan State Ensemble of Singing and Dancing named after Fikrat Amirov the choirmaster of the ensemble, Atayev Fakhraddin Gahraman oglu was given the title of Honored Art Worker of Azerbaijan Republic.

== Conducted ==
- In January 2001 in the city of Istanbul, Turkey, he acted as a leader of the orchestra for the operas "Leyli and Majnun" by U. Hajibeyov and "Ashug Garib" by Z.Hajibeyov with the company of actors of the Azerbaijan State Opera and Ballet Theatre.
