= Vav-consecutive =

Verb form with the letter waw in order to change its tense or aspect

The vav-consecutive or waw-consecutive (וי״ו ההיפוך) is a grammatical construction in Northwest Semitic languages, most notably in Biblical Hebrew, but with parallels in Moabite, Aramaic and Ugaritic. It involves a verb form prefixed with the letter waw with a change in its tense or aspect.

== Prefix vs. suffix conjugations ==
Biblical Hebrew has two main ways that each verb can be conjugated. The suffix conjugation takes suffixes indicating the person, number and gender of the subject, and normally indicates past tense or perfective aspect. The so-called prefix conjugation takes both prefixes and suffixes, with the prefixes primarily indicating person, as well as number for the 1st person and gender for the 3rd, while the suffixes (which are completely different from those used in the suffix conjugation) indicate number for the 2nd and 3rd persons and gender for the 2nd singular and 3rd plural. The prefix conjugation in Biblical Hebrew normally indicates non-past tense or imperfective aspect.

However, early Biblical Hebrew has two additional conjugations, both of which have an extra prefixed letter waw, with meanings more or less reversed from the normal meanings. That is, "vav + prefix conjugation" has the meaning of a past (particularly in a narrative context), and "vav + suffix conjugation" has the meaning of a non-past, opposite from normal (non-vav) usage. This apparent reversal of meaning triggered by the vav prefix led to the early term vav-conversive (ו' ההיפוך). The modern understanding, however, is somewhat more nuanced, and the term vav-consecutive is now used.

== Vav conjunction ==
This Hebrew prefix, spelled with the letter ו (vav), is normally a conjunction with the meaning of "and" or "and the". Although always appearing in unpointed texts as a simple vav, it has various pronunciations depending on meaning and phonetic context. Specifically:

1. When meaning "and", it is vocalized as וְ (/wə-/) in most contexts, but:
  1. as וּ (/u-/) either when the next consonant is a labial consonant (e.g. /b/, /p/, /m/, /w/) or when the vowel after the next consonant is a schwa.
  2. as וִ (/wi/) when it precedes the letter yod with schwa, יְ.
  3. sometimes as וָ when it immediately precedes an accented syllable.
  4. when it precedes the semi-vowels hataf qamets, hataf patah and hataf segol, it is vocalized with the parallel short vowel qamets qatan, patah, or segol, respectively.

Example:

- yōm wə-laylā
  יוֹם וְלַיְלָה
  Day and night.

== Consecutive verb syntax ==
Used with verbs, the prefix may have a second function, having the effect of altering the tense and/or aspect of the verb. This may be its sole function, e.g. in the beginning of a narrative; or it may be combined with the conjunctive function. Weingreen gives the following example. If one considers two simple past narrative statements, one expects to find them in the perfect tense:

- šāmar hammeleḵ eṯ dəḇar YHWH
  שָׁמַר הַמֶּלֶךְ אֶת דְּבַר יְהֹוָה
  The king kept the word of the LORD
- šāp̄aṭ eṯ hāʿām bəṣeḏeq
  שָׁפַט אֶת הָעָם בְּצֶדֶק
  He judged the people in righteousness.

Šāmar ("kept") and šāp̄aṭ ("judged") are simple perfect qal forms, and they are the citation forms (lemmas) of these verbs. If however these two sentences are not separate but in one continuous narrative then only the first verb is in the perfect, whereas the following verb ("and he judged") is in the imperfect (yišpōṭ) with a prefixed vav:

- šāmar hammeleḵ eṯ dəḇar YHWH wayyišpōṭ eṯ-haʿam bəṣeḏeq
  שָׁמַר הַמֶּלֶךְ אֶת דְּבַר יְהֹוָה וַיִּשְׁפֹּט אֶת הַעַם בְּצֶדֶק
  The king kept the word of the LORD and he judged the people in righteousness.

Conversely, in a continuous narrative referring to the future, the narrative tense will be the imperfect, but this becomes a perfect after the conjunction:

- yišmōr hammeleḵ eṯ dəḇar YHWH wəšāp̄aṭ eṯ-haʿam bəṣeḏeq

יִשְׁמֹר הַמֶּלֶךְ אֶת דְּבַר יְהֹוָה וְשָׁפַט אֶת הַעַם בְּצֶדֶק
The king will keep the word of the LORD and he will judge the people in righteousness.

When the vav prefix appears as part of a vav-consecutive form, it appears as /wǝ-/ (or /u-/) before the suffix conjugation, but /wa-/ + gemination before the prefix conjugation. Furthermore, the form of the prefix conjugation in the vav-consecutive form is sometimes different from that of the plain form, with stress retraction and concomitant weakening of the final vowel, e.g. in the hip̄ʿīl and nip̄ʿāl lexical conjugations.

Example:

Suffix conjugation		Prefix conjugation	
Normal	Vav-consecutive	Normal	Vav-consecutive
niḵnas	wǝ-niḵ'nas	yikkā'nēs	wa-yyik'kānes
"he entered"	"(and) he will enter"	"he will enter"	"(and) he entered"
hiḇ'dīl	wə-hiḇ'dīl	yaḇ'dīl	wa-yyaḇ'dēl
"he divided"	"(and) he will divide"	"he will divide"	"(and) he divided"

== Origins ==
The origin of this construction is usually placed in a shift in the meanings of certain verbal forms between Proto-Semitic and the Central Semitic languages. In Proto-Semitic, still largely reflected in East Semitic, prefix conjugations are used both for the past and the non-past, with different vocalizations. Cf. Akkadian niprus "we decided" (preterite), niptaras "we have decided" (perfect), niparras "we decide" (non-past), vs. suffix-conjugated parsānu "we are/were/will be deciding" (stative). According to Hetzron, Proto-Semitic had an additional form, the jussive, which was distinguished from the preterite only by the position of stress: the jussive had final stress while the preterite had non-final (retracted) stress.

Central Semitic significantly reshaped the system:

Form (Akkadian)	Proto-Semitic meaning	Vav-consecutive meaning	Central-Semitic meaning
ní-prus	preterite	past (esp. narrative)	—
ni-prús	jussive	—	non-past
ni-p-taras	perfect	—	made part of lexical conjugation system (cf. Form VIII -t- conjugation in Arabic)
ni-parras	non-past	—	—
parsānu	stative (tenseless)	future	past

Essentially, the old prefix-conjugated jussive broadened to cover the non-past in general, while the stative switched from a non-tense-specific form to something specifically indicating a past action; meanwhile, the old prefix-conjugated non-past was discarded, as was the prefix-conjugated past (which increasingly came to sound the same as the prefix-conjugated jussive). New suffixes were added to distinguish different grammatical moods (e.g. indicative mood vs. subjunctive vs. jussive).

According to Gotthelf Bergsträsser (1918), the emergence of the vav-consecutive took place in stages. First, the preterite */yaqtul/ and the imperfect */yaqtulu/ coalesced in Hebrew into a single verbal form, because of the loss of final short vowels. As a result, the freestanding */yaqtul/ preterite was generally lost in Hebrew. Hetzron suggests that its uses were prefixed with */hawaya/ "it was" to clearly distinguish it from the often-homophonous imperfect, and this evolved into /wa-/. This in turn was confused with /wa-/ "and the", causing it to take on the same phonological properties (e.g. the gemination of the following consonant). The non-past "/wǝ-/ + suffix-conjugation" was created by analogy, quite possibly influenced by the survival of the suffix conjugation as a stative form with nonspecific tense. Because the /wa-/ or /wǝ-/ was naturally interpreted as meaning "and" in addition to a signal for a different tensal interpretation of the forms, the vav-consecutive forms tended to be used in narrative, particularly in continuing rather than starting a story—precisely the places where the use of "and" would make sense.

Older explanations tended to posit that Hebrew was a "mixed language" derived from multiple Semitic sources, and that the two different tense systems reflect this mixed heritage. G. R. Driver writes: "All attempts to explain this at first sight strange phenomenon, whereby two tenses apparently exchange functions, on logical grounds, have failed, but the historical development of the Hebrew language readily accounts for it. When it is remembered that this is a composite language containing elements drawn from all the Semitic languages, it is at once seen why it has two pronouns for the first person... (Note: Hebrew has two words for "I": אֲנִי (ʾănî), which Driver explains as a West Semitic form, and אָנֹכִי (ʾānōḵî), which is East Semitic.) So there are two different systems, drawn from different sources, merged in the Hebrew scheme of tenses." On this view, the consecutive constructions are connected with the verb systems of East Semitic (Driver makes a comparison with Akkadian), whereas the ordinary verb construction reflects the usage in Northwest Semitic (Aramaic). The two have survived side-by-side in the Hebrew verb paradigm.

Vav-consecutive is attested in other Northwest Semitic languages as well: with imperfect, in Moabite, in Deir Alla Inscription, and in Aramaic; and with perfect in conditional clauses, in Ugaritic, in Amarna letters, and in Phoenician. However, usage of vav-consecutive with perfect in a narration is unique to Hebrew.

== Obsolescence ==
The Lachish letters, dating to c. 590 BC, have only a single occurrence of vav-consecutive; in all other cases, the perfect form is used to describe events in the past. This indicates that already in Late Biblical Hebrew the vav-consecutive was uncommon, especially outside of formal narrative style. By the time of Mishnaic Hebrew, the vav-consecutive fell completely out of use.

The vav-consecutive is not used in modern Hebrew, in which verbs have three tenses: past, future, and present. The future tense uses the prefix conjugation, the past uses the suffix forms, and the present uses the present participle (Hebrew: בינוני, romanized: bēnoní, lit. 'medial') which was less frequent in the biblical language.

The vav consecutive is considered stereotypically biblical (analogous to "thus saith," etc. in English) and is used jocularly for this reason by modern speakers, and sometimes in serious attempts to evoke a biblical context.

== Sources ==
- Gesenius' Hebrew Grammar, §49, §111, §112
- J. Weingreen, A Practical Grammar for Classical Hebrew, Oxford University Press 1939.
- A. B. Davidson, Hebrew Syntax, 1894, reprint of 3rd edition T&T Clark, Edinburgh, 1981.
